= United Nations Security Council Resolution 1082 =

UN Security Council Resolution 1082
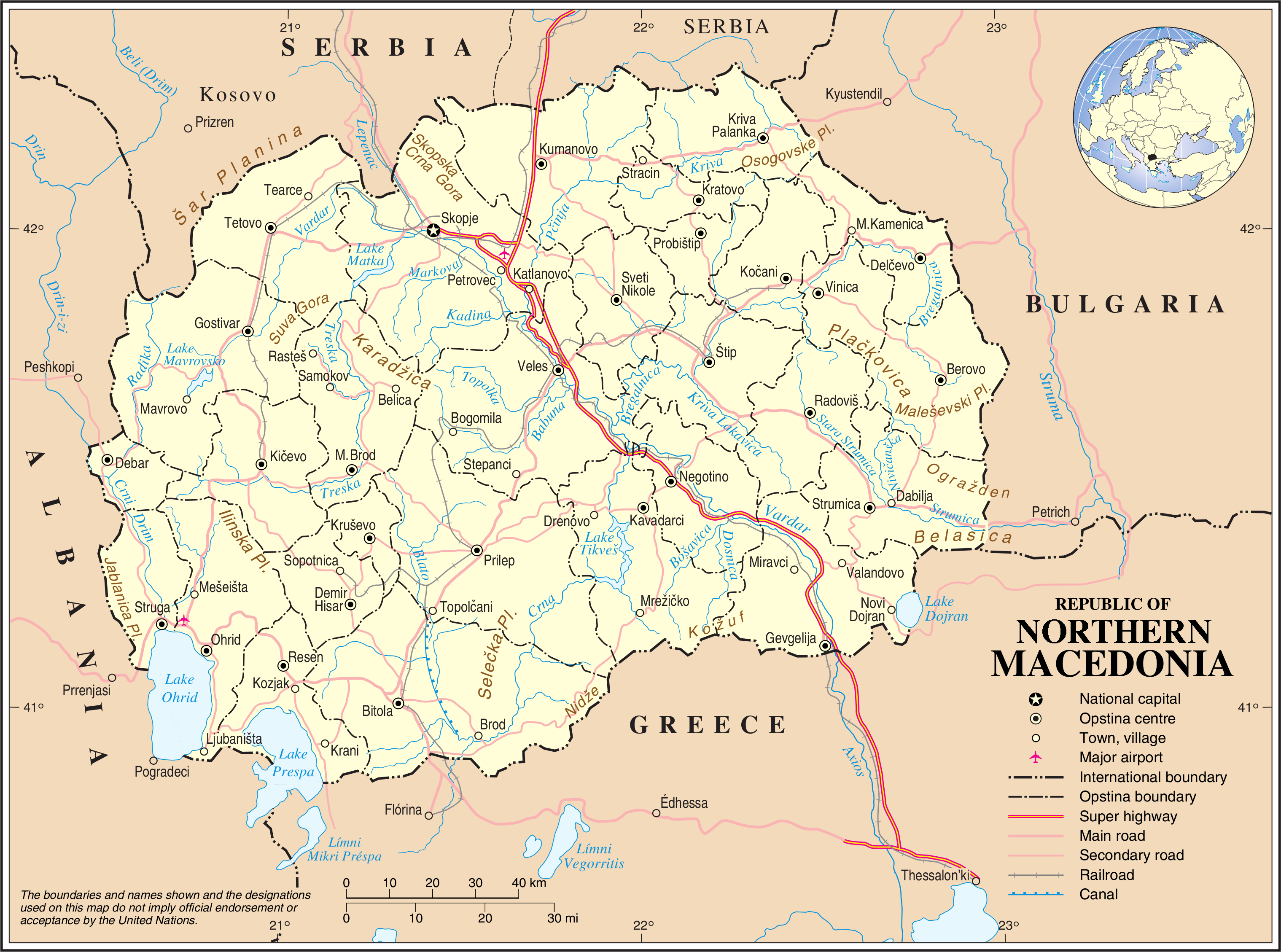
- Macedonia
- Date: 27 November 1996
- Meeting no.: 3,716
- Code: S/RES/1082 (Document)
- Subject: The situation in the former Yugoslav Republic of Macedonia
- Voting summary: 14 voted for; None voted against; 1 abstained
- Result: Adopted

Security Council composition
- Permanent members: China; France; Russia; United Kingdom; United States
- Non-permanent members: Botswana; Chile; Egypt; Guinea-Bissau; Germany; Honduras; Indonesia; Italy; South Korea; Poland

United Nations Security Council resolution 1082, adopted unanimously on 27 November 1996, after recalling previous resolutions including 1046 (1996) and 1058 (1996), the Council extended the mandate of the United Nations Preventive Deployment Force (UNPREDEP) in Macedonia until 31 May 1997 and reduced its size.

It was noted that UNPREDEP had played an important role in maintaining peace and stability in Macedonia. The security situation had continued to improve, but stability and peace in the former Yugoslavia had not yet been achieved. It was hoped that positive developments would continue and the size of UNPREDEP would be further retracted. Macedonia's relations with neighbouring countries had improved and an agreement was reached with the Federal Republic of Yugoslavia (Serbia and Montenegro) on the demarcation of their common border.

By extending UNPREDEP's mandate until 31 May 1997, the council also signalled the reduction of its military component by 300 by 30 April 1997 with a view to concluding its mandate when circumstances permitted. All Member States were urged to positively consider requests from the Secretary-General for assistance to be provided to UNPREDEP, requesting the Secretary-General to report back to the council by 15 April 1997 on recommendations for the future of the international presence in Macedonia.

Russia abstained.

== See also ==
- Bosnian War
- Breakup of Yugoslavia
- Croatian War of Independence
- List of United Nations Security Council Resolutions 1001 to 1100 (1995–1997)
- Macedonia naming dispute
- Yugoslav Wars
