= United Nations Security Council Resolution 1021 =

UN Security Council Resolution 1021
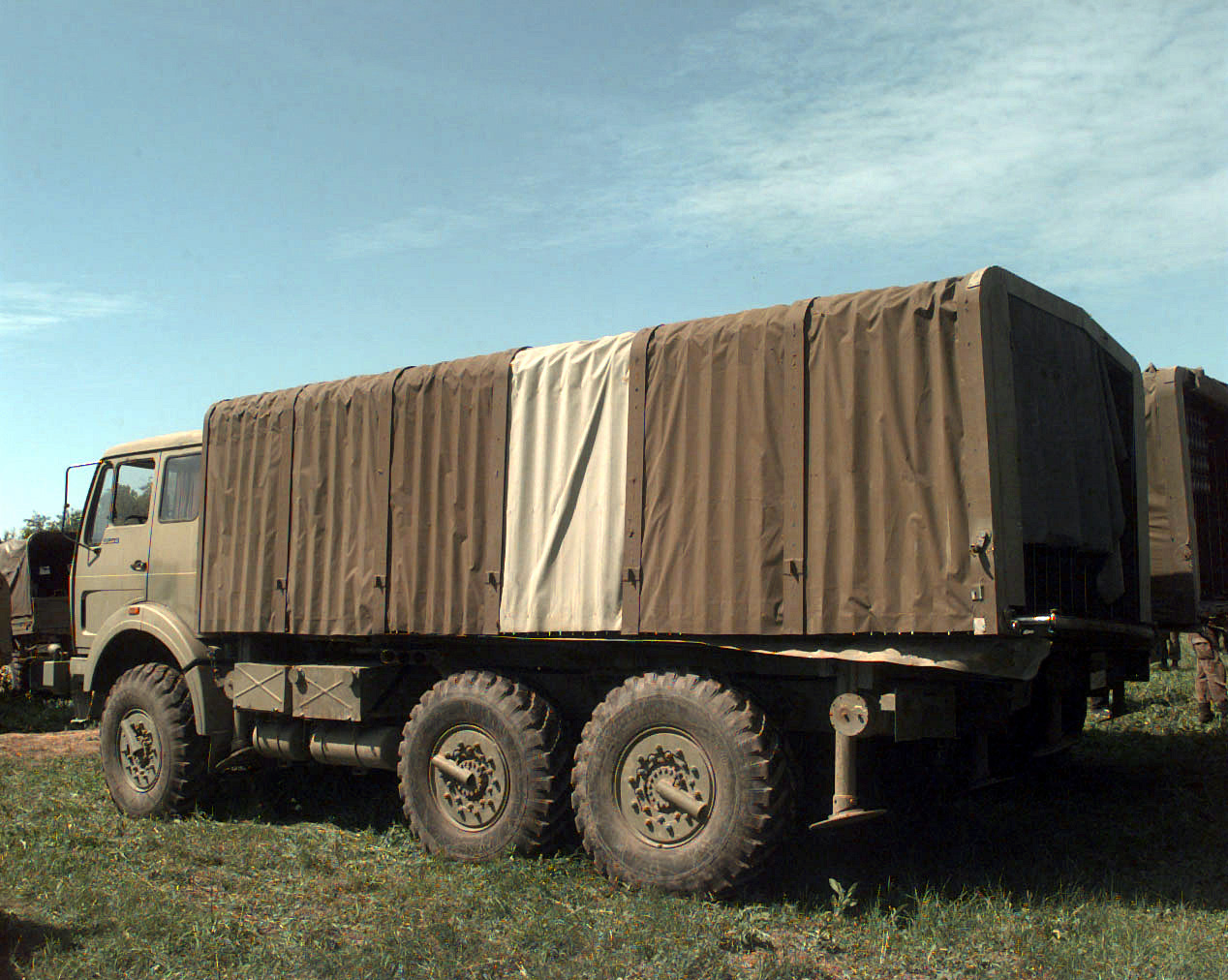
- Weapons inside Yugoslav trucks
- Date: 22 November 1995
- Meeting no.: 3,595
- Code: S/RES/1021 (Document)
- Subject: Former Yugoslavia
- Voting summary: 14 voted for; None voted against; 1 abstained
- Result: Adopted

Security Council composition
- Permanent members: China; France; Russia; United Kingdom; United States
- Non-permanent members: Argentina; Botswana; Czech Republic; Germany; Honduras; Indonesia; Italy; Nigeria; Oman; Rwanda

United Nations Security Council Resolution 1021, adopted on November 22, 1995, after recalling all resolutions on the situation in the former Yugoslavia, particularly resolutions 713 (1991) and 727 (1992), the Council set a date of March 13, 1996, for the suspension of most aspects of the arms embargo on the former Yugoslavia. Resolution 1074 (1996) terminated the remaining measures of the embargo.

A commitment to a peaceful settlement of conflicts in the former Yugoslavia was reaffirmed and the initialling of the General Framework Agreement in Dayton, Ohio between Bosnia and Herzegovina, Croatia, the Federal Republic of Yugoslavia (Serbia and Montenegro) and other parties was welcomed.

Acting under Chapter VII of the United Nations Charter, the Council decided that the arms embargo against the former Yugoslavia would be terminated beginning from the day the Secretary-General Boutros Boutros-Ghali notified the Council that the General Framework Agreement was signed and noted that:

(a) all provisions of the embargo would remain in place for the first 90 days;
(b) all provisions of the embargo would be terminated–except for the delivery of heavy weapons and ammunition, land mines, military aircraft and helicopters during the second 90 days;
(c) all provisions of the embargo would be terminated 180 days after receiving the report of the Secretary-General unless the Council decided otherwise.

The Council reaffirmed its commitment to regional stability and arms control, while the committee established in Resolution 727 was instructed to amend its guidelines accordingly.

Russia abstained from the voting on Resolution 1021, which was approved by the other 14 members of the Security Council.

== See also ==
- Bosnian War
- Breakup of Yugoslavia
- Croatian War of Independence
- List of United Nations Security Council Resolutions 1001 to 1100 (1995–1997)
- Yugoslav Wars
- List of United Nations Security Council Resolutions related to the conflicts in former Yugoslavia
