= United Nations Security Council Resolution 1080 =

UN Security Council Resolution 1080
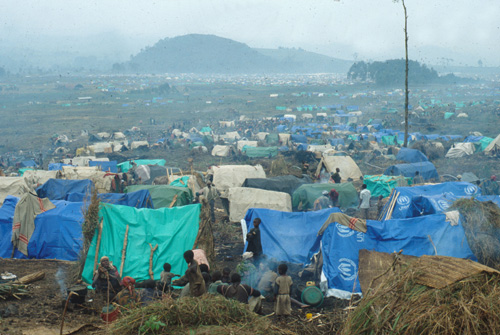
- Rwandan refugee camp in eastern Zaire
- Date: 15 November 1996
- Meeting no.: 3,713
- Code: S/RES/1080 (Document)
- Subject: The situation in the Great Lakes region
- Voting summary: 15 voted for; None voted against; None abstained
- Result: Adopted

Security Council composition
- Permanent members: China; France; Russia; United Kingdom; United States
- Non-permanent members: Botswana; Chile; Egypt; Guinea-Bissau; Germany; Honduras; Indonesia; Italy; South Korea; Poland

United Nations Security Council resolution 1080, adopted unanimously on 15 November 1996, after reaffirming Resolution 1078 (1996) on the situation in the African Great Lakes region, the council, acting under Chapter VII of the United Nations Charter, established a multinational humanitarian force in eastern Zaire.

The Security Council recognised that it urgently needed to address the situation in eastern Zaire. There was an urgent need for a conference on peace, security and development in the Great Lakes region under the auspices of the United Nations and Organisation of African Unity.

Acting under Chapter VII, the resolution again called for an immediate ceasefire and condemned all hostilities in the region. Meanwhile, there were offers from Member States concerning the creation of a temporary humanitarian force to help refugees and displaced people in eastern Zaire and assist those willing to return to Rwanda, and was also aimed at preventing the spread of the crisis elsewhere. Countries were urged to use all possible measures. Canada had offered to lead the force, which had received 10,000 troops from 20 countries. The operation would terminate on 31 March 1997, unless the objectives of the mission had been fulfilled earlier. A voluntary trust fund was created to receive funding for the operation.

The Council then intended for the establishment of a follow-on operation which would succeed the multinational force and in this regard requested the Secretary-General Boutros Boutros-Ghali to consider the mandate, scope, size and duration of such a force in a report to be submitted no later than 1 January 1997.

== See also ==
- Burundi Civil War
- Great Lakes refugee crisis
- List of United Nations Security Council Resolutions 1001 to 1100 (1995–1997)
- Rwandan genocide
