= United Nations Security Council Resolution 1072 =

UN Security Council Resolution 1072
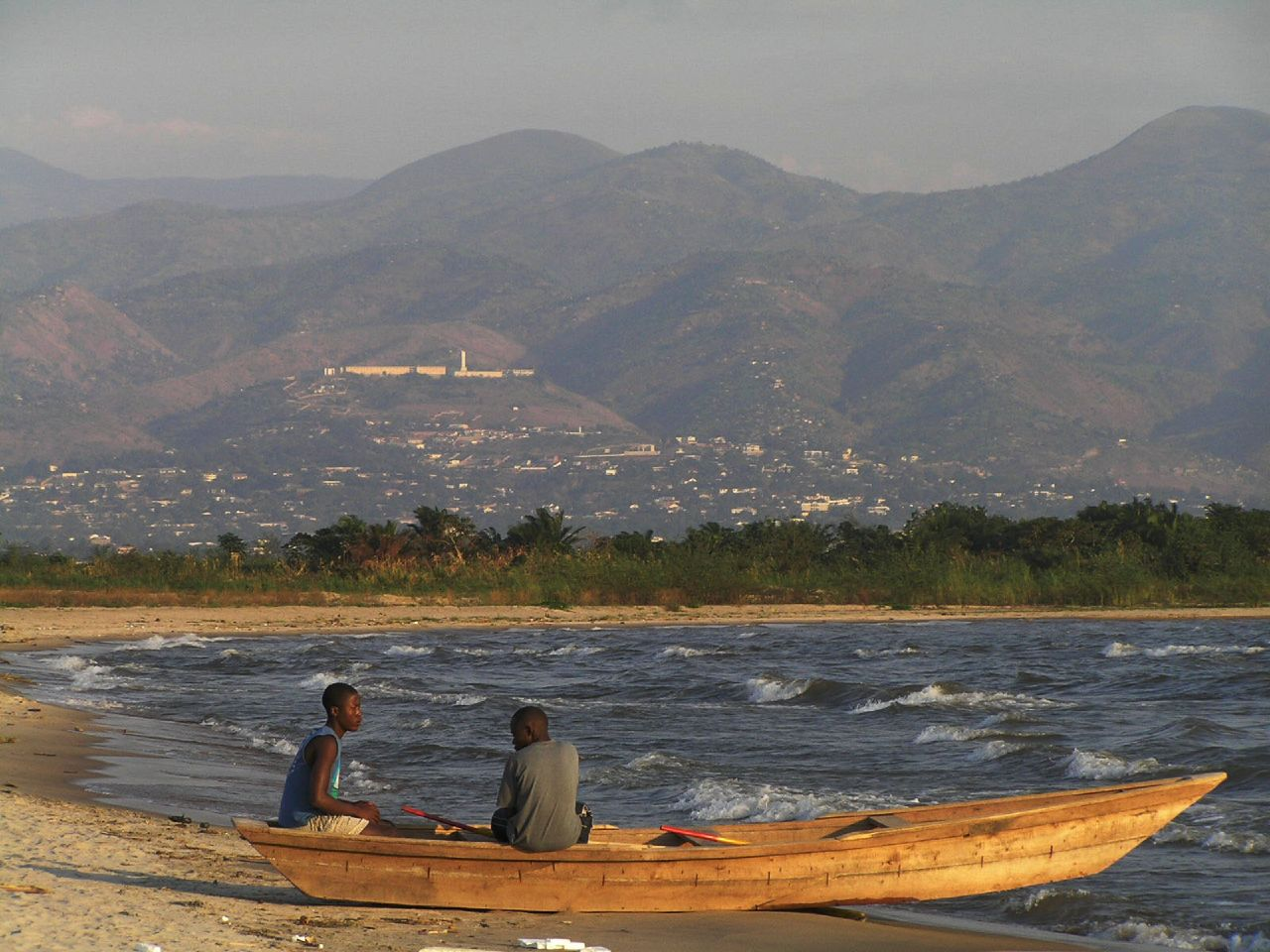
- Fishermen at Lake Tanganyika in Burundi
- Date: 30 August 1996
- Meeting no.: 3,695
- Code: S/RES/1072 (Document)
- Subject: The situation in Burundi
- Voting summary: 15 voted for; None voted against; None abstained
- Result: Adopted

Security Council composition
- Permanent members: China; France; Russia; United Kingdom; United States
- Non-permanent members: Botswana; Chile; Egypt; Guinea-Bissau; Germany; Honduras; Indonesia; Italy; South Korea; Poland

United Nations Security Council resolution 1072, adopted unanimously on 30 August 1996, after reaffirming all resolutions and statements by the President of the Security Council on the civil war in Burundi, the Council discussed efforts for a political settlement to the conflict in the country.

An attempted military coup was condemned by the council and concern was expressed regarding the humanitarian situation in the country and was marked by killings, massacres, torture and arbitrary detention which threatened peace and stability in the Great Lakes region. Attacks on humanitarian aid workers were condemned, and the need to establish humanitarian aid corridors was emphasised. Meanwhile, there were attempts to restart dialogue and launch negotiations, as the council noted that, in Resolution 1040 (1996), further measures could be imposed against Burundi.

The overthrow of the legitimate government and constitutional order in Burundi was condemned. The regime was called upon to restore the constitutional order and the National Assembly and to lift the ban on political parties. All hostilities were urged to be ceased immediately, and the convening of a conference on regional stability was urged.

The resolution stated that the matter would be reconsidered again on 31 October 1996 and asked the Secretary-General Boutros Boutros-Ghali to report by then on the situation in Burundi including the state of negotiations. If little or no progress was made, a possible arms embargo and restrictions against the leaders of the regime would be considered under the United Nations Charter.

== See also ==
- Burundi Civil War
- History of Burundi
- List of United Nations Security Council Resolutions 1001 to 1100 (1995–1997)
