= United Nations Security Council Resolution 1058 =

UN Security Council Resolution 1058
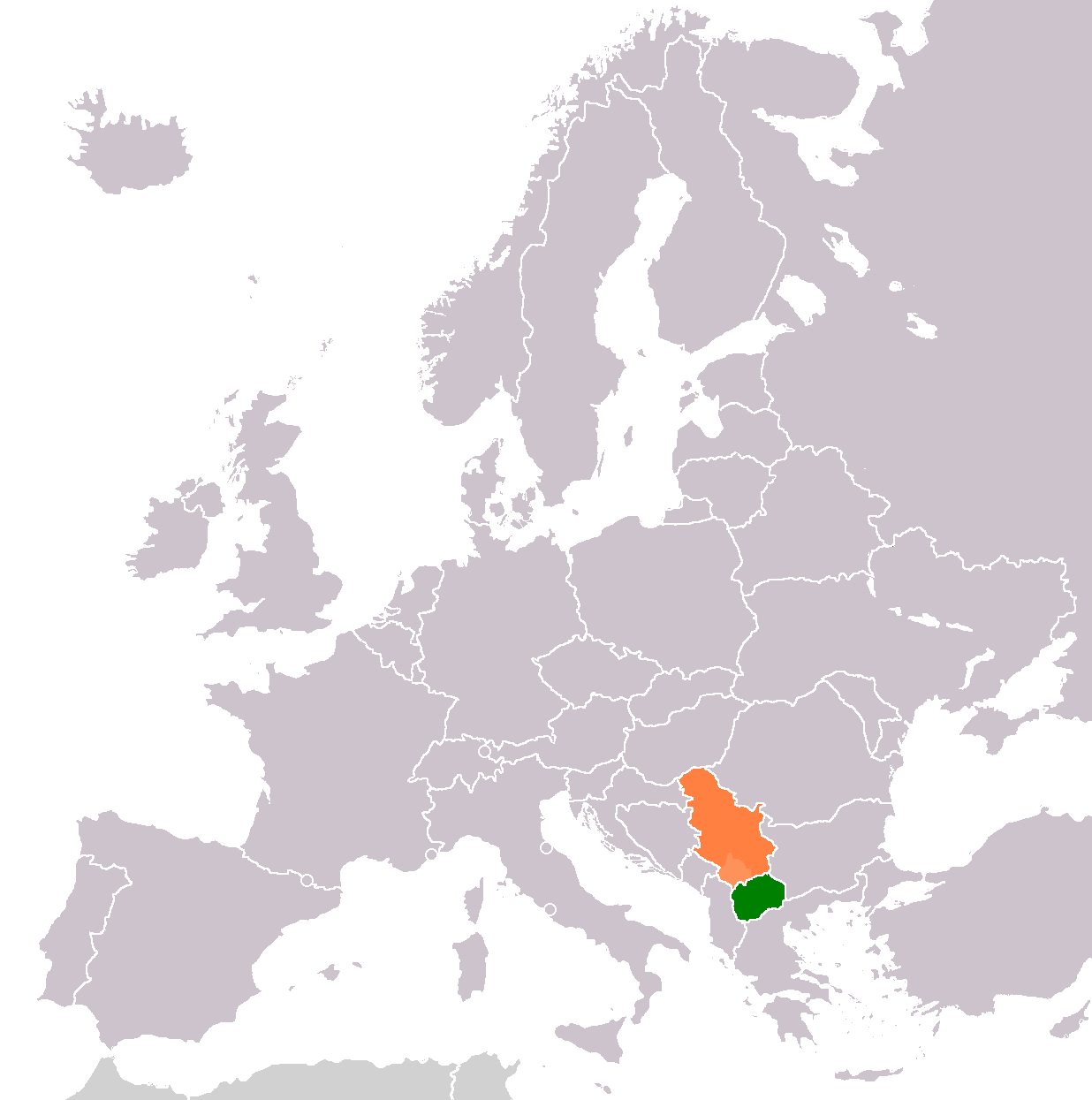
- Serbia (orange) and Macedonia (green)
- Date: 30 May 1996
- Meeting no.: 3,670
- Code: S/RES/1058 (Document)
- Subject: The situation in the former Yugoslav Republic of Macedonia
- Voting summary: 14 voted for; None voted against; 1 abstained
- Result: Adopted

Security Council composition
- Permanent members: China; France; Russia; United Kingdom; United States
- Non-permanent members: Botswana; Chile; Egypt; Guinea-Bissau; Germany; Honduras; Indonesia; Italy; South Korea; Poland

United Nations Security Council resolution 1058, adopted on 30 May 1996, after recalling previous resolutions including resolutions 1027 (1995) and 1046 (1996), the Council extended the mandate of the United Nations Preventive Deployment Force (UNPREDEP) in Macedonia until 30 November 1996.

The UNPREDEP mission played an important role in maintaining peace and stability in Macedonia and the security situation had improved. On 8 April 1996, Macedonia and the Federal Republic of Yugoslavia (Serbia and Montenegro) signed an agreement and both were now called upon to define their common boundary.

All Member States were urged to positively consider requests from the Secretary-General for assistance to be provided to UNPREDEP, requesting the Secretary-General to report by 30 September 1996 on the situation in the country and the strength and mandate of UNPREDEP.

Resolution 1058 was adopted by 14 votes to none against, with one abstention from Russia.

== See also ==
- Bosnian War
- Breakup of Yugoslavia
- Croatian War of Independence
- List of United Nations Security Council Resolutions 1001 to 1100 (1995–1997)
- Macedonia naming dispute
- Yugoslav Wars
