= United Nations Security Council Resolution 1071 =

UN Security Council Resolution 1071
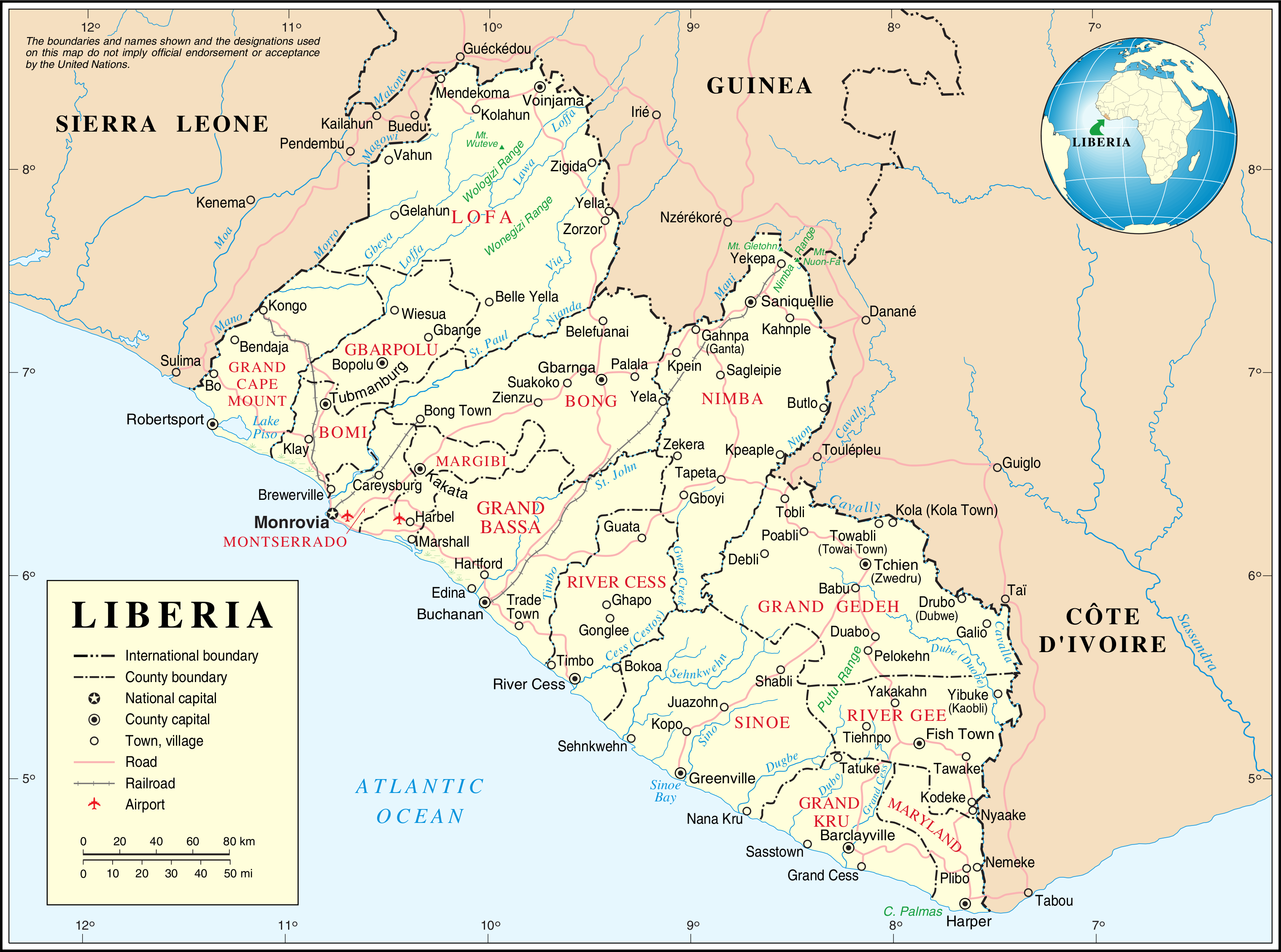
- Liberia
- Date: 30 August 1996
- Meeting no.: 3,694
- Code: S/RES/1071 (Document)
- Subject: The situation in Liberia
- Voting summary: 15 voted for; None voted against; None abstained
- Result: Adopted

Security Council composition
- Permanent members: China; France; Russia; United Kingdom; United States
- Non-permanent members: Botswana; Chile; Egypt; Guinea-Bissau; Germany; Honduras; Indonesia; Italy; South Korea; Poland

United Nations Security Council resolution 1071, adopted unanimously on 30 August 1996, after recalling all resolutions on the situation in Liberia, particularly Resolution 1059 (1996), the Council extended the mandate of the United Nations Observer Mission in Liberia (UNOMIL) until 30 November 1996 and discussed matters relating to UNOMIL.

The Council welcomed the restoration of the capital Monrovia as a safe haven. Ultimately, the Liberian people and their leaders were primarily responsible for peace and reconciliation.

After extending the mandate of UNOMIL until 30 November 1996, it was also noted that the Economic Community of West African States (ECOWAS) had agreed to extend the Abuja Agreement until 15 June 1997, established a timetable for implementation of the agreement, adopted a mechanism to verify compliance by faction leaders and discussed possible measures against the factions in the event of noncompliance. All attacks on the Economic Community of West African States Monitoring Group (ECOMOG), the ECOWAS peacekeeping force in Liberia, aid agencies and UNOMIL were condemned.

The council proceeded to condemn the use of child soldiers and urged the respect of human rights. All states were instructed to strictly observe the arms embargo imposed on the country in Resolution 788 (1992) and report violations to the committee established in Resolution 985 (1995).

== See also ==
- Abuja Accord (Liberia)
- Charles Taylor
- First Liberian Civil War
- List of United Nations Security Council Resolutions 1001 to 1100 (1995–1997)
