= United Nations Security Council Resolution 1049 =

UN Security Council Resolution 1049
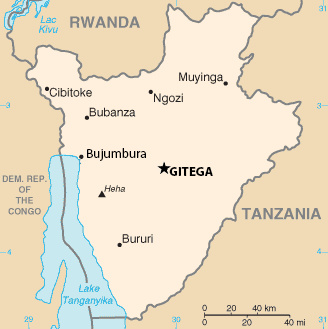
- Burundi
- Date: 5 March 1996
- Meeting no.: 3,639
- Code: S/RES/1049 (Document)
- Subject: The situation in Burundi
- Voting summary: 15 voted for; None voted against; None abstained
- Result: Adopted

Security Council composition
- Permanent members: China; France; Russia; United Kingdom; United States
- Non-permanent members: Botswana; Chile; Egypt; Guinea-Bissau; Germany; Honduras; Indonesia; Italy; South Korea; Poland

United Nations Security Council resolution 1049, adopted unanimously on 5 March 1996, after reaffirming Resolution 1040 (1996) concerning Burundi, the Council called for an end to violence in the country and discussed preparations for a conference on security in the African Great Lakes region.

The resolution began by welcoming the efforts of the President Sylvestre Ntibantunganya and Prime Minister of Burundi Antoine Nduwayo to calm the situation in country. The council was deeply concerned about aid provided to certain groups that was made by those responsible for the Rwandan genocide, and the violence and incitement to ethnic hatred by radio stations. It was noted that the Commission of Inquiry, established in Resolution 1012 (1995) reported that security given to it by the United Nations was insufficient. All concerned in Burundi had to make efforts to defuse the crisis and engage in dialogue.

The Security Council condemned the violence against civilians, refugees and humanitarian aid personnel and the assassinations of government officials in Burundi. All concerned in Burundi had to refrain from violence or incitement to do so and attempts to overthrow the government in an unconstitutional way. Instead, serious negotiations were urged to take place. The Secretary-General Boutros Boutros-Ghali was asked to report on the possible establishment of a radio station to promote reconciliation and dialogue. International co-operation was requested with regard to humanitarian assistance, and military and judicial reform in Burundi.

Burundi was reminded of its responsibility to provide security for the Commission of Inquiry and for all parties to co-operate with it. The Organisation of African Unity was requested to increase the size of its observer mission in the country. Meanwhile, the Secretary-General was asked to accelerate preparations to convene a regional conference on peace, security and development in the Great Lakes region and was further required to report to the council by 1 May 1996 on the situation in Burundi and progress made in implementing the current resolution.

== See also ==
- Burundi Civil War
- Great Lakes refugee crisis
- List of United Nations Security Council Resolutions 1001 to 1100 (1995–1997)
- Rwandan genocide
