= United Nations Security Council Resolution 1076 =

UN Security Council Resolution 1076
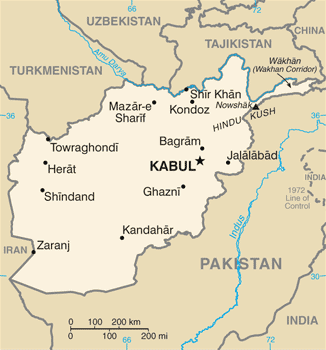
- Afghanistan
- Date: 22 October 1996
- Meeting no.: 3,706
- Code: S/RES/1076 (Document)
- Subject: The situation in Afghanistan
- Voting summary: 15 voted for; None voted against; None abstained
- Result: Adopted

Security Council composition
- Permanent members: China; France; Russia; United Kingdom; United States
- Non-permanent members: Botswana; Chile; Egypt; Guinea-Bissau; Germany; Honduras; Indonesia; Italy; South Korea; Poland

United Nations Security Council resolution 1076, adopted unanimously on 22 October 1996, after considering the situation in Afghanistan, resolutions by the General Assembly and the Joint Declaration made on 4 October 1996 by the leaders of Kazakhstan, Kyrgyzstan, Russia, Tajikistan and Uzbekistan on developments in the country, the Council discussed the deteriorating political, military and humanitarian situation in Afghanistan.

There were concerns about the military confrontation and the killing of refugees, as well as the discrimination against women and the violation of human rights in Afghanistan. All parties in the country were asked to resolve their disputes by peaceful means, and the Council stressed the importance of non-interference in the internal affairs of the country, including flows of weapons into Afghanistan. It was convinced that the United Nations would continue to play a central role in international efforts to bring about a political settlement to the conflict.

All Afghan parties were called upon to cease hostilities immediately and to start a political dialogue, as they themselves were responsible for a political solution. Meanwhile, all other countries were asked to refrain from interfering in Afghanistan's internal affairs, respect its territorial integrity, sovereignty and independence and respect the right of the Afghan people to determine their own destiny. The countries were also urged to end the supply of arms and ammunition to all Afghan parties.

The resolution reiterated that the conflict in Afghanistan was an ideal breeding ground for terrorism and drug trafficking which could destabilise the region and therefore the parties were called upon to stop such activities. Furthermore, the parties were urged to end laying land mines because of the many civilian casualties. The council also condemned the discrimination against Afghan girls and women and other violations of human rights and international humanitarian law. All Afghan parties were urged to co-operate with the United Nations Special Mission to Afghanistan and efforts from the Organisation of the Islamic Conference were requested.

Humanitarian assistance was urged from the international community and organisations. Finally, the Secretary-General Boutros Boutros-Ghali was requested to report on the situation to the council and the implementation of the current resolution by 30 November 1996.

== See also ==
- War in Afghanistan (1978–present)
- Civil war in Afghanistan (1992–1996)
- Civil war in Afghanistan (1996–2001)
- List of United Nations Security Council Resolutions 1001 to 1100 (1995–1997)
- United Nations Special Mission to Afghanistan
