= United Nations Security Council Resolution 1024 =

UN Security Council Resolution 1024
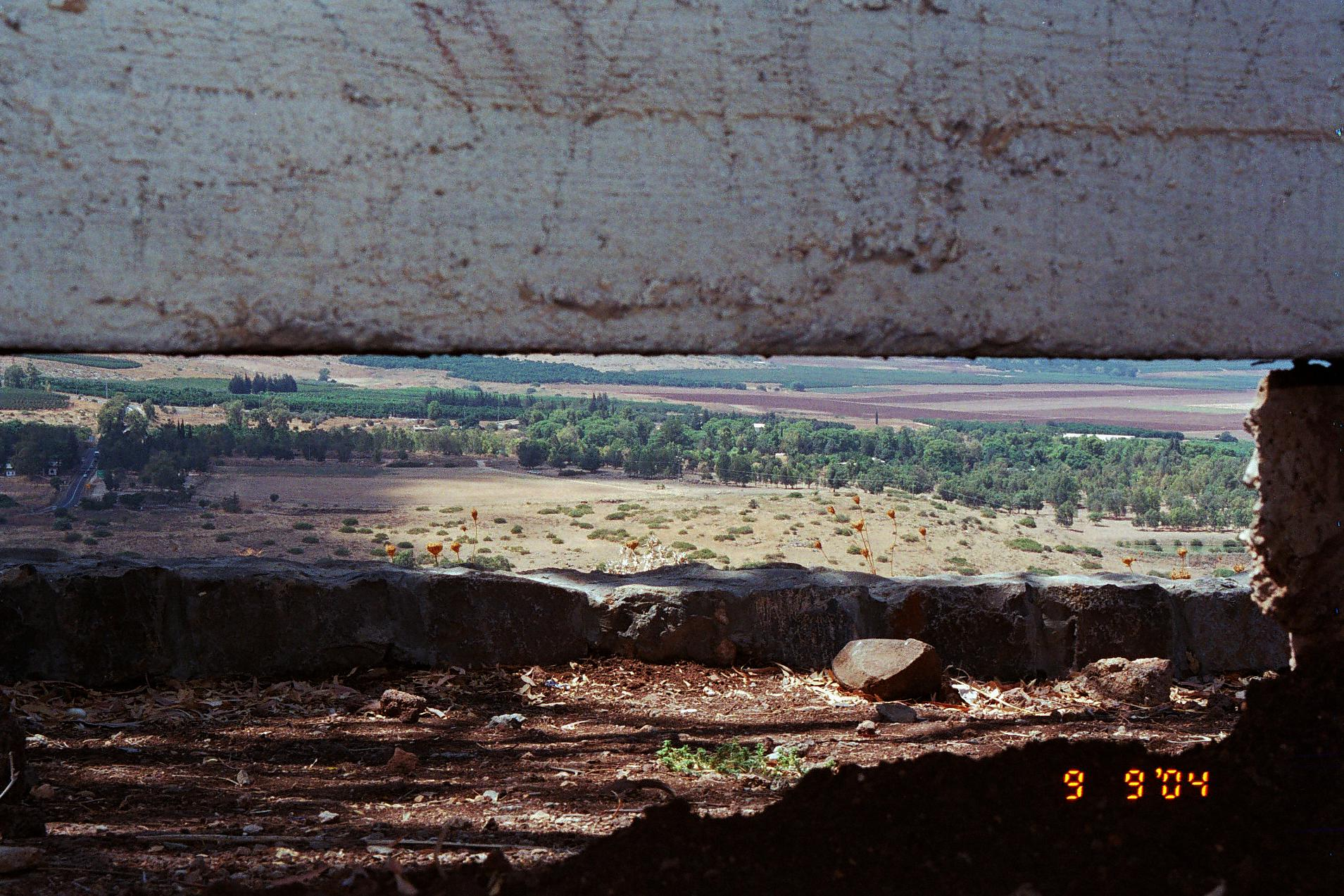
- View from Syrian bunker over Israeli territory
- Date: 28 November 1995
- Meeting no.: 3,599
- Code: S/RES/1024 (Document)
- Subject: Israel–Syria
- Voting summary: 15 voted for; None voted against; None abstained
- Result: Adopted

Security Council composition
- Permanent members: China; France; Russia; United Kingdom; United States
- Non-permanent members: Argentina; Botswana; Czech Republic; Germany; Honduras; Indonesia; Italy; Nigeria; Oman; Rwanda

United Nations Security Council resolution 1024, adopted unanimously on 28 November 1995, after considering a report by the Secretary-General Boutros Boutros-Ghali regarding the United Nations Disengagement Observer Force (UNDOF), the Council noted its efforts to establish a durable and just peace in the Middle East.

The resolution decided to call upon the parties concerned to immediately implement Resolution 338 (1973), it renewed the mandate of the Observer Force for another six months until 31 May 1996 and requested that the Secretary-General submit a report on the situation at the end of that period.

The Force was established in 1974 to supervise the ceasefire called for in an agreement between Israeli and Syrian forces.

== See also ==
- Arab–Israeli conflict
- Golan Heights
- Israel–Syria relations
- List of United Nations Security Council Resolutions 1001 to 1100 (1995–1997)
