= United Nations Security Council Resolution 1084 =

UN Security Council Resolution 1084
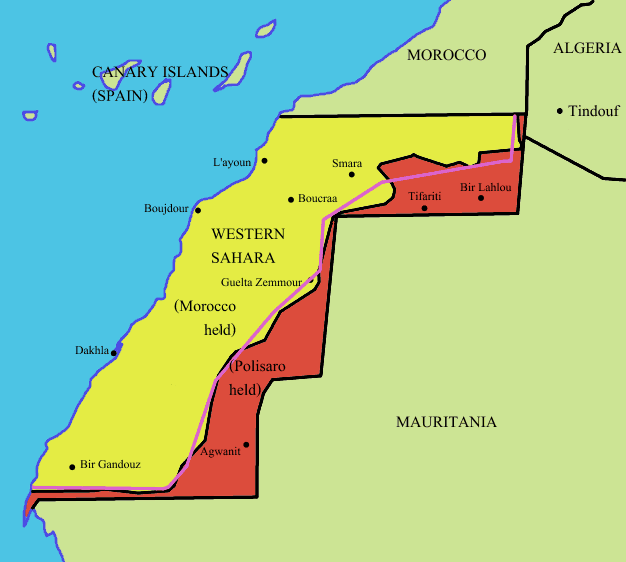
- Western Sahara with Moroccan (yellow) and Polisario (red) controlled territory
- Date: 27 November 1996
- Meeting no.: 3,718
- Code: S/RES/1084 (Document)
- Subject: The situation concerning Western Sahara
- Voting summary: 15 voted for; None voted against; None abstained
- Result: Adopted

Security Council composition
- Permanent members: China; France; Russia; United Kingdom; United States
- Non-permanent members: Botswana; Chile; Egypt; Guinea-Bissau; Germany; Honduras; Indonesia; Italy; South Korea; Poland

United Nations Security Council resolution 1084, adopted unanimously on 27 November 1996, after reaffirming all previous resolutions on the Western Sahara, the Council discussed the implementation of the Settlement Plan for Western Sahara and extended the mandate of the United Nations Mission for the Referendum in Western Sahara (MINURSO) until 31 May 1997.

Both Morocco and Polisario Front were committed to the United Nations Settlement Plan. As part of the plan, parties had to respect the ceasefire and restart discussions. Both parties also had to have a vision for the period after the upcoming referendum. The completion of reductions by the Secretary-General Boutros Boutros-Ghali to aspects of MINURSO had been noted.

The Security Council reiterated its commitment to holding a free and fair referendum on self-determination for the people of Western Sahara. The parties had shown their good by releasing prisoners and co-operating with the Office of the United Nations High Commissioner for Refugees in pursuing humanitarian work. The Secretary-General was requested to continue his efforts to resolve the impasse in implementing the United Nations plan and to report by 28 February 1997 on the situation, including alternative steps that may be taken should there be no progress. A comprehensive report on the implementation of the current resolution was requested by 9 May 1997.

== See also ==
- History of Western Sahara
- List of United Nations Security Council Resolutions 1001 to 1100 (1995–1997)
- Sahrawi Arab Democratic Republic
- Moroccan Western Sahara Wall
