= United Nations Security Council Resolution 1092 =

UN Security Council Resolution 1092
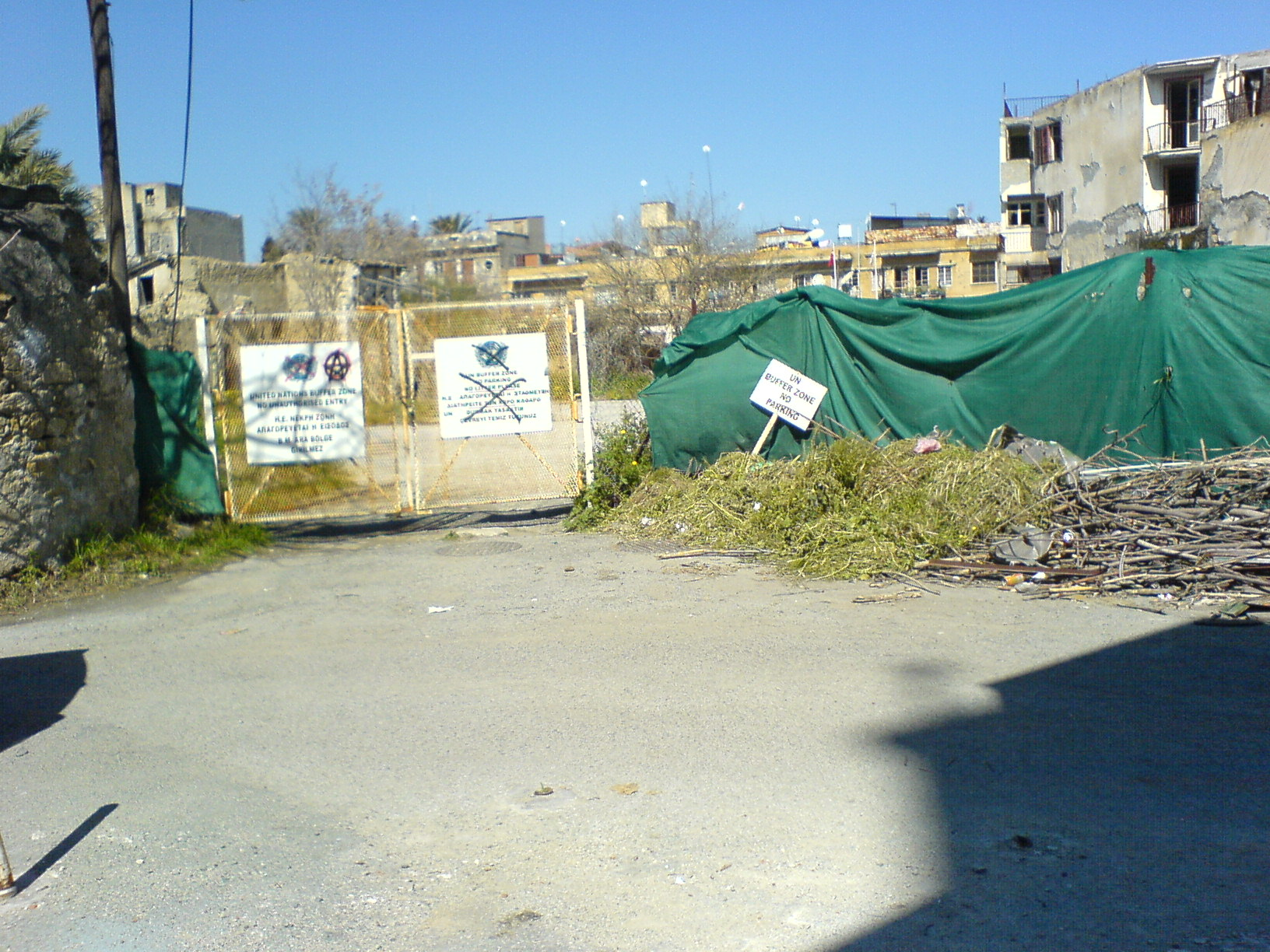
- United Nations Buffer Zone in Nicosia
- Date: 23 December 1996
- Meeting no.: 3,728
- Code: S/RES/1092 (Document)
- Subject: The situation in Cyprus
- Voting summary: 15 voted for; None voted against; None abstained
- Result: Adopted

Security Council composition
- Permanent members: China; France; Russia; United Kingdom; United States
- Non-permanent members: Botswana; Chile; Egypt; Guinea-Bissau; Germany; Honduras; Indonesia; Italy; South Korea; Poland

United Nations Security Council resolution 1092, adopted unanimously on 23 December 1996, after recalling all resolutions on Cyprus, particularly resolutions 186 (1964), 939 (1994) and 1062 (1996), the Council expressed concern at the deterioration of the political dispute in Cyprus and extended the mandate of the United Nations Peacekeeping Force in Cyprus (UNFICYP) until 30 June 1997.

Over the year, the situation on the island deteriorated and escalated tensions between the two communities on the island nation. The violence along the ceasefire line was unseen since 1974 and there was also increased the violence against UNFICYP personnel. The Security Council stated that the negotiations for a solution to the dispute had been delayed for too long and were in deadlock.

The Council deplored the deaths of three Greek Cypriot civilians and one Turkish Cypriot soldier, and the injuries to civilians and UNFICYP, noting in particular the disproportionate use of force by Northern Cyprus and the passive role played by the Cypriot police when dealing with civilian demonstrations. It regretted that there was no progress in implementing the following measures:

(a) extending the 1989 unmanning agreement to other areas where the two sides remained close to each other;
(b) a ban on weapons around the ceasefire line;
(c) a code of conduct for troops near the ceasefire line.

The military authorities on both sides were called upon to:

(a) clear all minefields around the buffer zone;
(b) cease construction of military buildings around the buffer zone;
(c) conduct no military exercises along the buffer zone.

Defence spending in Cyprus had to be reduced and the current stagnation in the peace process was unacceptable to the council. It regretted that humanitarian recommendations were not implemented. Discussions on accession to the European Union were an important new development that were expected to facilitate an overall settlement of the Cyprus problem. The Secretary-General was requested to report back to the council by 10 June 1997 on the implementation of the current resolution.

== See also ==
- Cyprus dispute
- List of United Nations Security Council Resolutions 1001 to 1100 (1995–1997)
- United Nations Buffer Zone in Cyprus
- Turkish Invasion of Cyprus
