= United Nations Security Council Resolution 1018 =

UN Security Council Resolution 1018
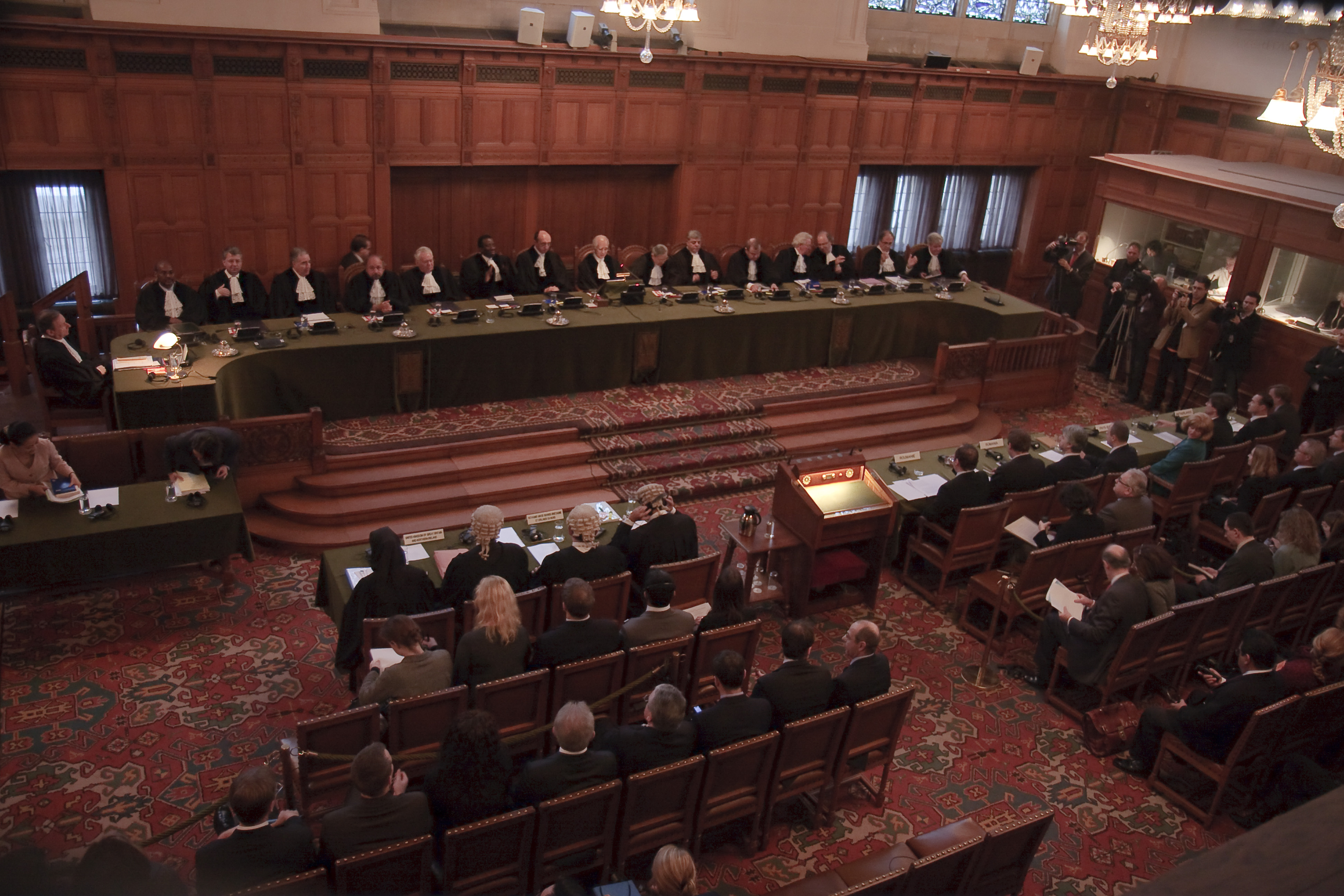
- ICJ judges during a hearing
- Date: 7 November 1995
- Meeting no.: 3,590
- Code: S/RES/1018 (Document)
- Subject: International Court of Justice
- Voting summary: 15 voted for; None voted against; None abstained
- Result: Adopted

Security Council composition
- Permanent members: China; France; Russia; United Kingdom; United States
- Non-permanent members: Argentina; Botswana; Czech Republic; Germany; Honduras; Indonesia; Italy; Nigeria; Oman; Rwanda

United Nations Security Council resolution 1018, adopted unanimously on 7 November 1995, after noting the death of International Court of Justice (ICJ) judge Andrés Aguilar-Mawdsley on 24 October 1995, the Council decided that elections to the vacancy on the ICJ would take place on 28 February 1996 at the Security Council and at a meeting of the General Assembly during its 50th session.

Mawdsley, a Venezuelan jurist and former Minister of Justice, was a member of the court since 1991. His term of office was due to expire in February 2000.

== See also ==
- Judges of the International Court of Justice
- List of United Nations Security Council Resolutions 1001 to 1100 (1995–1997)
