= United Nations Security Council Resolution 1098 =

UN Security Council Resolution 1098
- Flag of UNITA
- Date: 27 February 1997
- Meeting no.: 3,743
- Code: S/RES/1098 (Document)
- Subject: The situation in Angola
- Voting summary: 15 voted for; None voted against; None abstained
- Result: Adopted

Security Council composition
- Permanent members: China; France; Russia; United Kingdom; United States
- Non-permanent members: Chile; Costa Rica; Egypt; Guinea-Bissau; Japan; Kenya; South Korea; Poland; Portugal; Sweden

United Nations Security Council resolution 1098, adopted unanimously on 27 February 1997, after reaffirming Resolution 696 (1991) and all subsequent resolutions on Angola, the Council extended the mandate of the United Nations Angola Verification Mission III (UNAVEM III) until 31 March 1997.

The resolution noted that the formation of a Government of National Unity and Reconciliation was again delayed because UNITA did not comply with the established timetable in the context of the Lusaka Protocol. The implementation of political and military aspects of the peace agreements had also been delayed and stressed the importance of UNITA in fulfilling its obligations.

After extending UNAVEM III's mandate, the Council called upon the Government of Angola and UNITA to resolve remaining issues and establish the Government of National Unity and Reconciliation, requesting the Secretary-General Kofi Annan to report by 20 March 1997 on progress made in this regard.

The Security Council expressed its readiness to impose measures against UNITA, described in Resolution 864 (1993) and stressed that the efforts of the Special Representative of the Secretary-General, in conjunction with the Joint Commission, were essential for the peace process.

== See also ==
- Angolan Civil War
- List of United Nations Security Council Resolutions 1001 to 1100 (1995–1997)
- MONUA
- United Nations Angola Verification Mission I
- United Nations Angola Verification Mission II
