= United Nations Security Council Resolution 1030 =

United Nations Security Council resolution

UN Security Council Resolution 1030
- Flag of Tajikistan
- Date: 14 December 1995
- Meeting no.: 3,606
- Code: S/RES/1030 (Document)
- Subject: Tajikistan
- Voting summary: 15 voted for; None voted against; None abstained
- Result: Adopted

Security Council composition
- Permanent members: China; France; Russia; United Kingdom; United States
- Non-permanent members: Argentina; Botswana; Czech Republic; Germany; Honduras; Indonesia; Italy; Nigeria; Oman; Rwanda

United Nations Security Council resolution 1030, adopted unanimously on 14 December 1995, after recalling previous resolutions 968 (1994) and 999 (1995) on the situation in Tajikistan, the Council extended the mandate of the United Nations Mission of Observers in Tajikistan (UNMOT) until 15 June 1996 and addressed the process of national reconciliation in the country.

In the capital Dushanbe, talks had commenced between the government and opposition and this was welcomed by the security council. The primary responsibility of the parties was to settle their differences themselves, and international support depended on their efforts to do so. Both parties had pledged to pursue peaceful reconciliation by way of concessions and compromises. The council also drew attention to the unacceptability of hostilities on the border with Afghanistan.

The mandate of UNMOT was extended until 15 June 1996 on the condition that the Tehran Agreement and ceasefire remained in force and the parties would be committed to national reconciliation and the promotion of democracy. The Secretary-General Boutros Boutros-Ghali was requested to report on the situation every three months.

Concern was expressed at the slow progress in the peace talks and emphasised the need for the immediate implementation of confidence-building measures. Direct dialogue between the President Emomalii Rahmon and the leader of the Islamic Revival Movement was encouraged. The parties, UNMOT, the Commonwealth of Independent States peacekeeping forces, border troops and the Organization for Security and Co-operation in Europe mission were also urged to work more closely.

== See also ==
- Civil war in Tajikistan
- History of Tajikistan
- List of United Nations Security Council Resolutions 1001 to 1100 (1995–1997)
