= United Nations Security Council Resolution 1099 =

UN Security Council Resolution 1099
- Flag of Tajikistan
- Date: 14 March 1997
- Meeting no.: 3,752
- Code: S/RES/1099 (Document)
- Subject: The situation in Tajikistan and along the Tajik-Afghan border
- Voting summary: 15 voted for; None voted against; None abstained
- Result: Adopted

Security Council composition
- Permanent members: China; France; Russia; United Kingdom; United States
- Non-permanent members: Chile; Costa Rica; Egypt; Guinea-Bissau; Japan; Kenya; South Korea; Poland; Portugal; Sweden

United Nations Security Council resolution 1099, adopted unanimously on 14 March 1997, after recalling all resolutions on the situation in Tajikistan and the Tajik-Afghan border, the Council extended the mandate of the United Nations Mission of Observers in Tajikistan (UNMOT) until 15 June 1997 and addressed efforts to end the conflict in the country.

During talks in Moscow, the President of Tajikistan, Emomalii Rahmon and the United Tajik Opposition (UTO) signed agreements on military issues and the reintegration, disarmament and dismantling of UTO units. The Security Council took note of requests made by both parties regarding the implementation of the agreements. Meanwhile, the humanitarian situation in Tajikistan had deteriorated and there were attacks on UNMOT, the peacekeeping forces of the Commonwealth of Independent States (CIS) and other international personnel, which necessitated Secretary-General Kofi Annan's decision to suspend United Nations activities in Tajikistan apart from a limited presence of UNMOT. Other personnel were temporarily evacuated to Uzbekistan.

The Security Council welcomed the agreements reached by both parties, calling for both parties to comply fully with them and noted that the ceasefire had generally been observed. The mistreatment of UNMOT and other international personnel was severely condemned and the Government of Tajikistan was requested to take security measures in response. UNMOT's mandate was extended on the condition that Tehran Agreement remained in effect and commitments to other agreements were reached.

The Secretary-General was required to keep the Council informed on the situation, and was requested to report by 30 April 1997 on possible ways in which the United Nations could help with the implementation of the peace agreements and to further report by 1 June 1997 on recommendations on the United Nations presence in the country. Finally, Member States were requested to contribute to the voluntary fund established in Resolution 968 (1994) for humanitarian needs.

== See also ==
- Tajikistani Civil War
- History of Tajikistan
- List of United Nations Security Council Resolutions 1001 to 1100 (1995–1997)
