= United Nations Security Council Resolution 1089 =

UN Security Council Resolution 1089
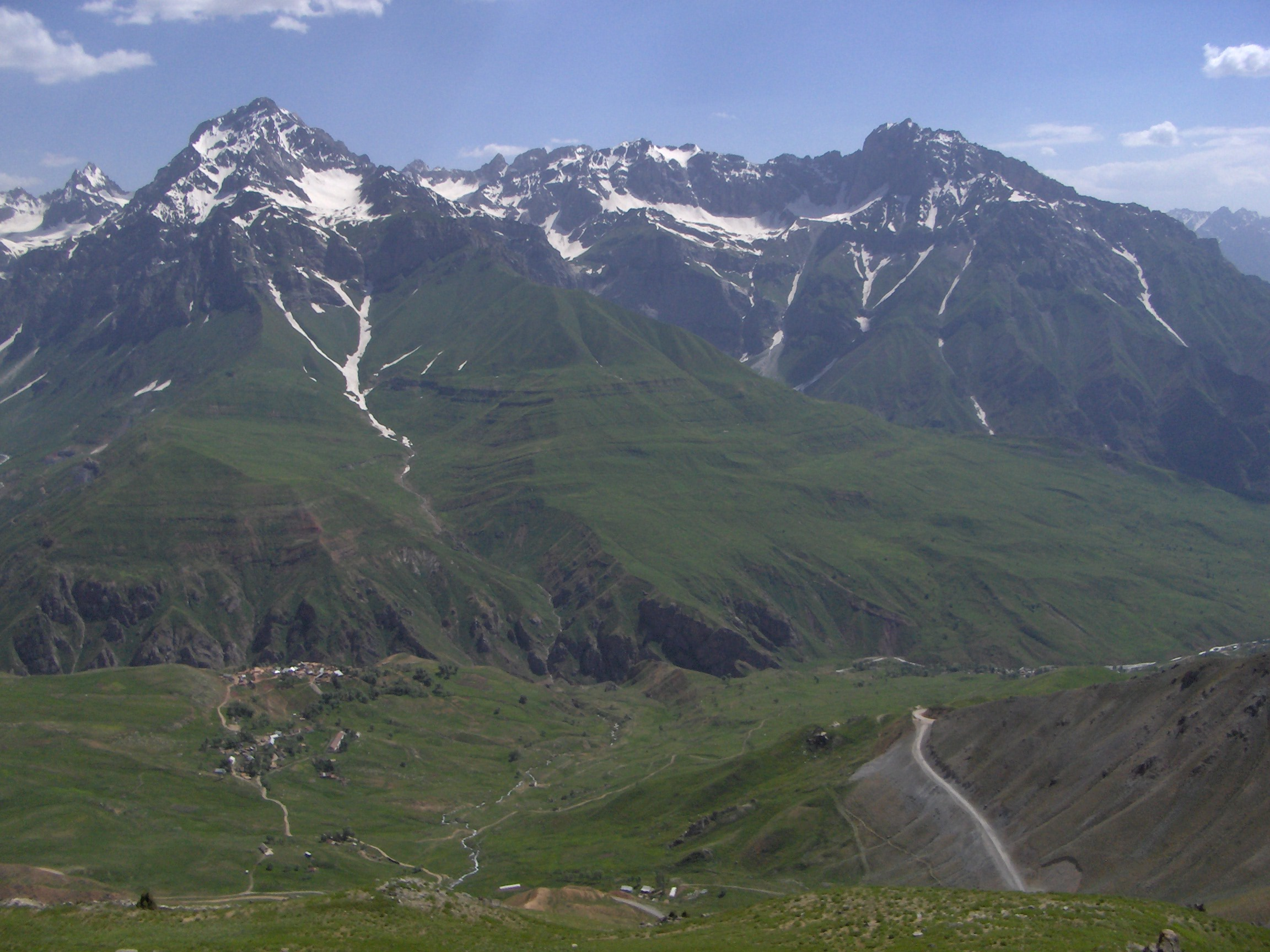
- Tajik mountains
- Date: 13 December 1996
- Meeting no.: 3,724
- Code: S/RES/1089 (Document)
- Subject: The situation in Tajikistan and along the Tajik-Afghan border
- Voting summary: 15 voted for; None voted against; None abstained
- Result: Adopted

Security Council composition
- Permanent members: China; France; Russia; United Kingdom; United States
- Non-permanent members: Botswana; Chile; Egypt; Guinea-Bissau; Germany; Honduras; Indonesia; Italy; South Korea; Poland

United Nations Security Council resolution 1089, adopted unanimously on 13 December 1996, after recalling all resolutions on the situation in Tajikistan and the Tajik-Afghan border, the Council extended the mandate of the United Nations Mission of Observers in Tajikistan (UNMOT) until 15 March 1997 and addressed efforts to end the conflict in the country.

There was concern about the deteriorating situation in Tajikistan, and the Security Council emphasised the need for the parties concerned to uphold their agreements. The situation would only be resolved through political means between the Government of Tajikistan and the United Tajik Opposition and it was their primary responsibility to do so. The resolution also stressed the unacceptability of hostile acts on the border with Afghanistan and was satisfied at co-operation between UNMOT, the Commonwealth of Independent States (CIS) peacekeeping force, Russian border forces and the Organization for Security and Co-operation in Europe.

The Council condemned violations of the ceasefire, particularly the opposition offensive in the Gharm region. All parties were urged to comply with the Tehran Agreement and other agreements they had entered into and that the ceasefire would last during the inter-Tajik discussions. It also condemned terrorist attacks and other violence which resulted in the deaths of civilians, members of the CIS peacekeepers and Russian border guards. Death threats against UNMOT and its mistreatment were also severely condemned.

The mandate of the UNMOT monitoring mission was extended until 15 March 1997 on the condition that the parties to the Tehran Agreement demonstrated their commitment to national reconciliation. By 15 January 1997, the Secretary-General was requested to report to the council on the outcome of the talks. There was also concern over the worsening humanitarian situation in Tajikistan, and for the urgent need of the international community to respond, including voluntary contributions to Resolution 968 (1994).

== See also ==
- Civil war in Tajikistan
- History of Tajikistan
- List of United Nations Security Council Resolutions 1001 to 1100 (1995–1997)
