= United Nations Security Council Resolution 1081 =

UN Security Council Resolution 1081
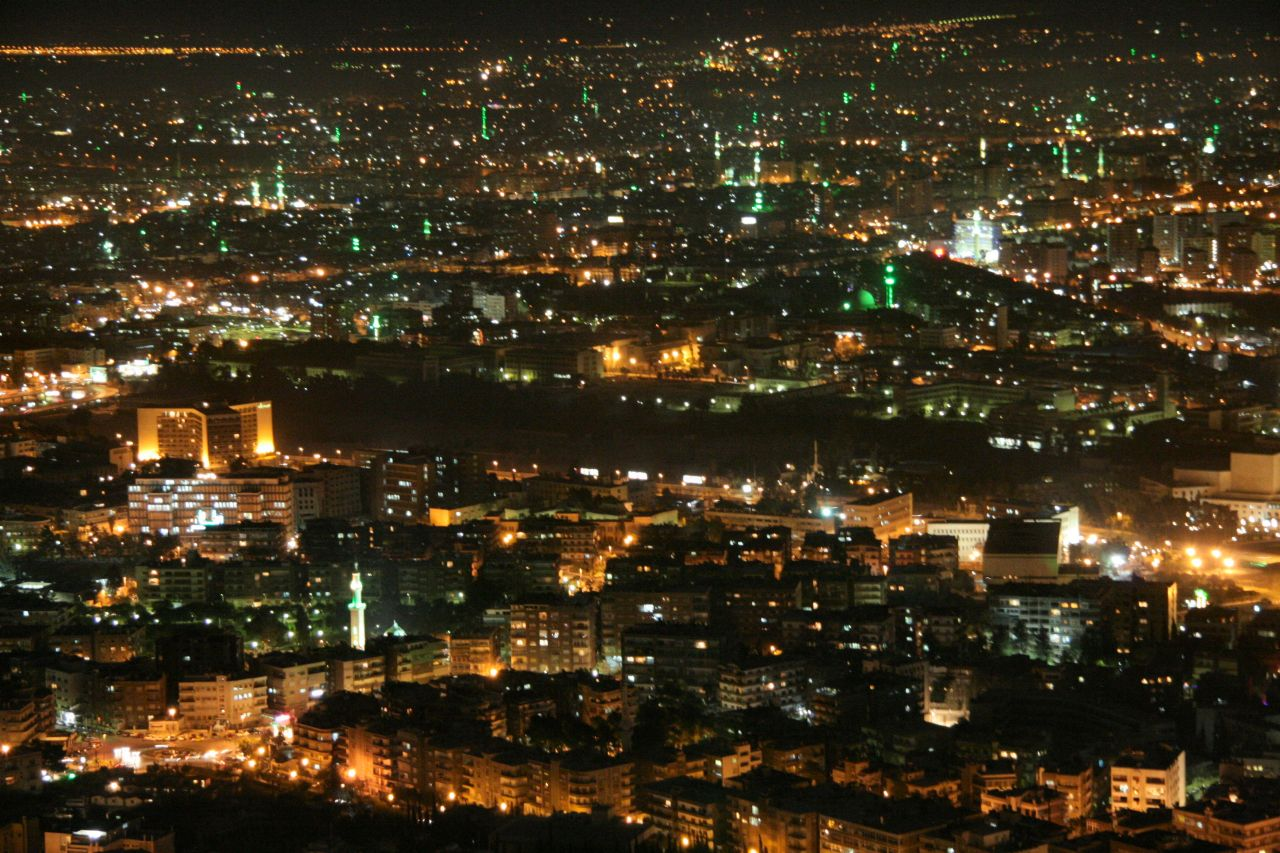
- Syrian capital Damascus
- Date: 27 November 1996
- Meeting no.: 3,715
- Code: S/RES/1081 (Document)
- Subject: The situation in the Middle East
- Voting summary: 15 voted for; None voted against; None abstained
- Result: Adopted

Security Council composition
- Permanent members: China; France; Russia; United Kingdom; United States
- Non-permanent members: Botswana; Chile; Egypt; Guinea-Bissau; Germany; Honduras; Indonesia; Italy; South Korea; Poland

United Nations Security Council resolution 1081, adopted unanimously on 27 November 1996, after considering a report by the Secretary-General Boutros Boutros-Ghali regarding the United Nations Disengagement Observer Force (UNDOF), the Council noted its efforts to establish a durable and just peace in the Middle East.

The resolution called upon the parties concerned to immediately implement Resolution 338 (1973). It renewed the mandate of the Observer Force for another six months until 31 May 1997 and requested that the Secretary-General submit a report on the situation at the end of that period.

== See also ==
- Arab–Israeli conflict
- Golan Heights
- Israel–Syria relations
- List of United Nations Security Council Resolutions 1001 to 1100 (1995–1997)
