= United Nations Security Council Resolution 1042 =

UN Security Council Resolution 1042
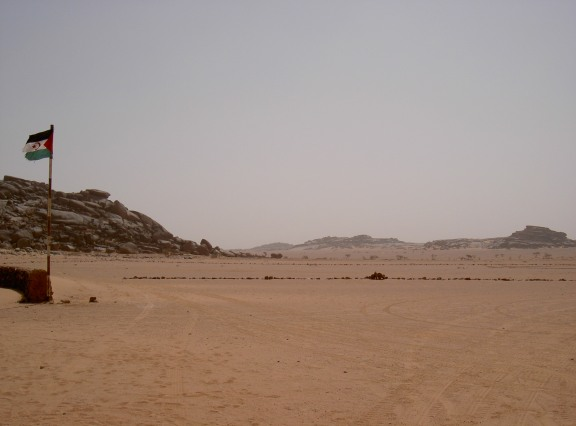
- Polisario held territory of Western Sahara
- Date: 31 January 1996
- Meeting no.: 3,625
- Code: S/RES/1042 (Document)
- Subject: The situation concerning Western Sahara
- Voting summary: 15 voted for; None voted against; None abstained
- Result: Adopted

Security Council composition
- Permanent members: China; France; Russia; United Kingdom; United States
- Non-permanent members: Botswana; Chile; Egypt; Guinea-Bissau; Germany; Honduras; Indonesia; Italy; South Korea; Poland

United Nations Security Council resolution 1042, adopted unanimously on 31 January 1996, after reaffirming all previous resolutions on the Western Sahara, the Council discussed the Settlement Plan for Western Sahara and extended the mandate of the United Nations Mission for the Referendum in Western Sahara (MINURSO) until 31 May 1996.

The Security Council once again reiterated its commitment to the holding of a referendum on self-determination for the people of Western Sahara as accepted by both Morocco and the Polisario Front. There was concern about the lack of progress towards completion of the Settlement Plan, and both parties were urged to co-operate with MINURSO and the Secretary-General Boutros Boutros-Ghali in resuming the identification process and to identify ways to create confidence between themselves.

The resolution supported the intention of the Secretary-General to bring the situation to the immediate attention of the Council if no progress was being made and would therefore consider plans to withdraw MINURSO. He was requested to submit a report by 15 May 1996 on the situation.

== See also ==
- History of Western Sahara
- List of United Nations Security Council Resolutions 1001 to 1100 (1995–1997)
- Sahrawi Arab Democratic Republic
- Moroccan Western Sahara Wall
