= United Nations Security Council Resolution 1094 =

UN Security Council Resolution 1094
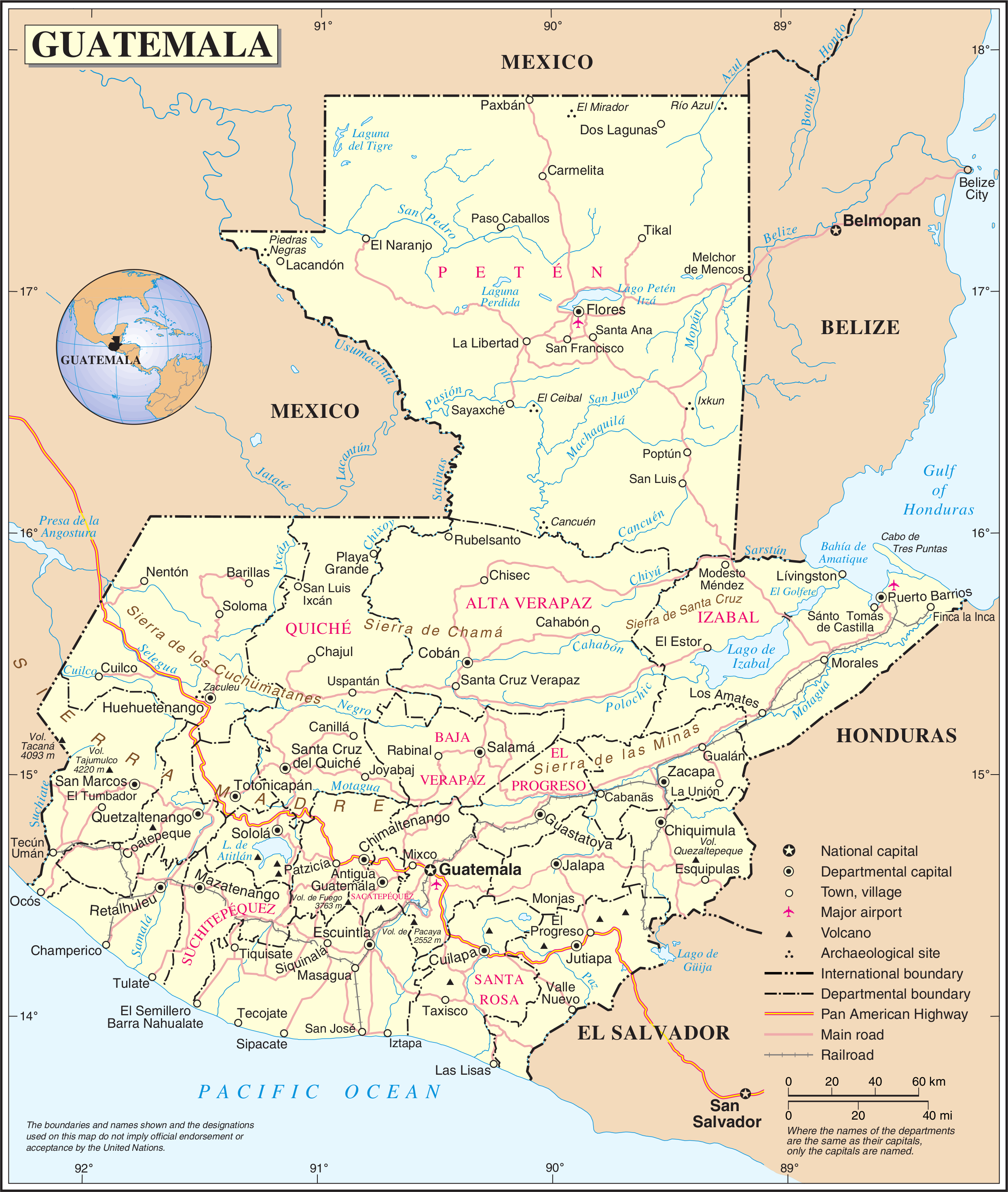
- Guatemala
- Date: 20 January 1997
- Meeting no.: 3,732
- Code: S/RES/1094 (Document)
- Subject: Central America: efforts towards peace
- Voting summary: 15 voted for; None voted against; None abstained
- Result: Adopted

Security Council composition
- Permanent members: China; France; Russia; United Kingdom; United States
- Non-permanent members: Chile; Costa Rica; Egypt; Guinea-Bissau; Japan; Kenya; South Korea; Poland; Portugal; Sweden

United Nations Security Council resolution 1094, adopted on 20 January 1997, expressed support for the peace process in Guatemala, which had been monitored by the United Nations since 1994. The Council authorized the attachment of 155 military observers to the United Nations Verification Mission in Guatemala (MINUGUA) after the end of the civil war.

The Council recalled agreements between the Government of Guatemala and the Guatemalan National Revolutionary Unity (URNG) in which the parties agreed to allow the United Nations to verify the implementation of the peace accords. The verification process would involve the deployment of United Nations military personnel.

It was decided that 155 military observers and medical personnel would be deployed with MINUGUA for a period of three months. The Secretary-General Kofi Annan, was requested to notify the Council two weeks before the operation was to begin. Both parties were called upon to implement their agreements fully and to co-operate with regard to the ceasefire, separation of forces, disarmament and demobilisation of URNG combatants and other commitments. Meanwhile, the international community was invited to continue providing assistance during the implementation process.

China had previously vetoed a prior resolution on Guatemala, due to remarks from Guatemalan officials favouring independence for Taiwan.

== See also ==
- Guatemalan Civil War
- List of United Nations Security Council Resolutions 1001 to 1100 (1995–1997)
