= United Nations Security Council Resolution 1056 =

UN Security Council Resolution 1056
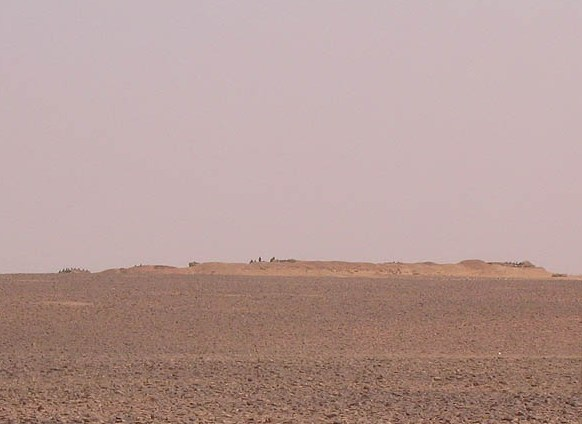
- Moroccan Wall in the Western Sahara
- Date: 29 May 1996
- Meeting no.: 3,668
- Code: S/RES/1056 (Document)
- Subject: The situation concerning Western Sahara
- Voting summary: 15 voted for; None voted against; None abstained
- Result: Adopted

Security Council composition
- Permanent members: China; France; Russia; United Kingdom; United States
- Non-permanent members: Botswana; Chile; Egypt; Guinea-Bissau; Germany; Honduras; Indonesia; Italy; South Korea; Poland

United Nations Security Council resolution 1056, adopted unanimously on 29 May 1996, after reaffirming all previous resolutions on the Western Sahara, the Council discussed the Settlement Plan for Western Sahara, including the suspension of the voter identification process, and extended the mandate of the United Nations Mission for the Referendum in Western Sahara (MINURSO) until 30 November 1996.

The Security Council stressed the importance of the ceasefire as part of the United Nations peace plan. Despite difficulties, there were now more than 60,000 voters identified for the referendum on self-determination. To make further progress, the Council stated that both parties had a vision for the period after the referendum.

Again, the Council reaffirmed its commitment to the holding of a referendum on self-determination for the people of Western Sahara, in accordance with the Settlement Plan. It expressed regret that the parties did not want to co-operate with MINURSO to allow it to complete the identification of voters, and therefore the process was suspended. The resolution agreed with the Secretary-General Boutros Boutros-Ghali's recommendation that the military component of MINURSO be reduced by 20% as this would not affect the operational capacity of the peacekeeping force. The Security Council was satisfied that the parties complied with ceasefire and asked them to show their good will by releasing political prisoners and to accelerate the implementation of the peace plan.

The proposal of the Secretary-General to maintain a political office to continue dialogue between the parties was supported. After extending the MINURSO's mandate until 30 November 1996, the Council stressed that if no progress was made between Morocco and the Polisario Front, further reductions in MINURSO would be considered. The resumption of the identification process would be supported if progress was made, however. Finally, the resolution concluded by requesting the Secretary-General to submit a report on the implementation of the current resolution by 10 November 1996.

== See also ==
- History of Western Sahara
- List of United Nations Security Council Resolutions 1001 to 1100 (1995–1997)
- Sahrawi Arab Democratic Republic
- Moroccan Western Sahara Wall
