= United Nations Security Council Resolution 1016 =

UN Security Council Resolution 1016
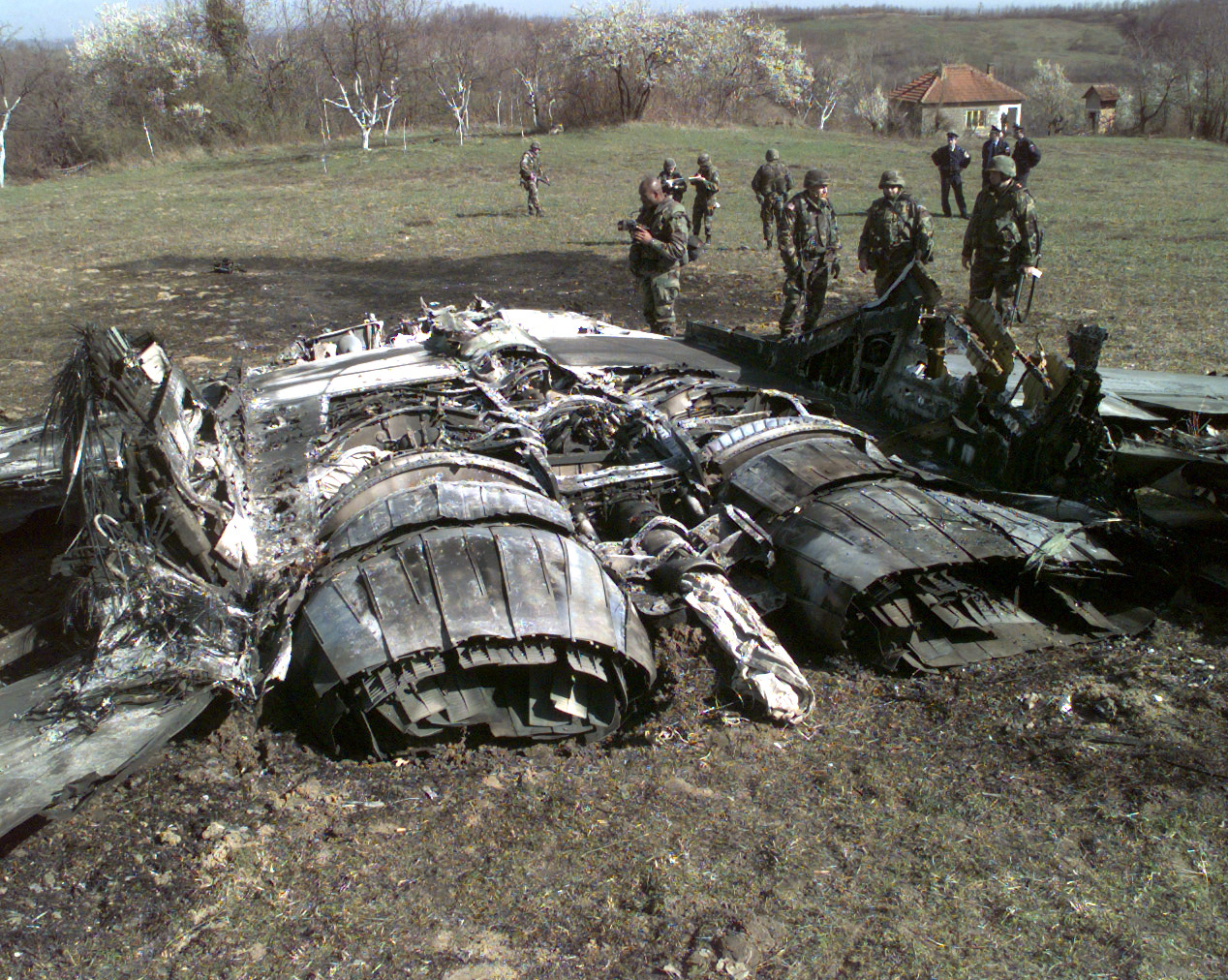
- Downed MiG-29 Fulcrum fighter jet of the former Yugoslavia
- Date: 21 September 1995
- Meeting no.: 3,581
- Code: S/RES/1016 (Document)
- Subject: Bosnia and Herzegovina
- Voting summary: 15 voted for; None voted against; None abstained
- Result: Adopted

Security Council composition
- Permanent members: China; France; Russia; United Kingdom; United States
- Non-permanent members: Argentina; Botswana; Czech Republic; Germany; Honduras; Indonesia; Italy; Nigeria; Oman; Rwanda

United Nations Security Council resolution 1016, adopted unanimously on 21 September 1995, after recalling all resolutions on the situation in the former Yugoslavia, the Council called for greater efforts to reach a comprehensive political solution to the conflict in Bosnia and Herzegovina and demanded that both Bosnia and Herzegovina and Croatia end their offensive in Western Bosnia.

The council was concerned that the situation in Bosnia and Herzegovina was a humanitarian crisis, particularly due to recent fighting, loss of life, many refugees and displaced persons and suffering amongst the civilian population as a result of military actions. It also deplored the casualties suffered by the Danish peacekeepers and sent condolences to the families of those who had died. In this regard all parties were urged to cease hostilities and observe a ceasefire.

Member States involved in promoting an overall peaceful settlement in the region were called upon to intensify their efforts in conjunction with humanitarian aid agencies, noting that there could be no military solution to the conflict in Bosnia and Herzegovina. The Secretary-General was required to provide additional information on the humanitarian situation to the council as soon as possible.

== See also ==
- Army of the Republika Srpska
- Bosnian War
- Breakup of Yugoslavia
- Croatian War of Independence
- List of United Nations Security Council Resolutions 1001 to 1100 (1995–1997)
- Yugoslav Wars
