= United Nations Security Council Resolution 1028 =

UN Security Council Resolution 1028
- Date: 8 December 1995
- Meeting no.: 3,604
- Code: S/RES/1028 (Document)
- Subject: Rwanda
- Voting summary: 15 voted for; None voted against; None abstained
- Result: Adopted

Security Council composition
- Permanent members: China; France; Russia; United Kingdom; United States
- Non-permanent members: Argentina; Botswana; Czech Republic; Germany; Honduras; Indonesia; Italy; Nigeria; Oman; Rwanda

United Nations Security Council resolution 1028, adopted unanimously on 8 December 1995, after recalling previous resolutions on Rwanda, particularly Resolution 997 (1995), the Council considered a report by the Secretary-General and extended the mandate of the United Nations Assistance Mission for Rwanda (UNAMIR) for a period ending 12 December 1995. The extension was given so that the council had more time to consider the future of UNAMIR.

== See also ==
- List of United Nations Security Council Resolutions 1001 to 1100 (1995–1997)
- Rwandan Civil War
- Rwandan genocide
- United Nations Observer Mission Uganda–Rwanda
