= United Nations Security Council Resolution 1091 =

UN Security Council Resolution 1091
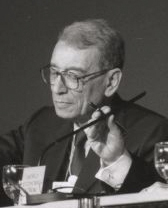
- Boutros Boutros-Ghali
- Date: 13 December 1996
- Meeting no.: 3,725
- Code: S/RES/1091 (Document)
- Subject: Recommendation regarding the appointment of the Secretary-General
- Result: Adopted

Security Council composition
- Permanent members: China; France; Russia; United Kingdom; United States
- Non-permanent members: Botswana; Chile; Egypt; Guinea-Bissau; Germany; Honduras; Indonesia; Italy; South Korea; Poland

United Nations Security Council resolution 1091, adopted without a vote at a closed meeting on 13 December 1996, the Council acknowledged the contributions of the outgoing Secretary-General, Boutros Boutros-Ghali, whose term would expire on 31 December 1996.

The Security Council recognised the role that Boutros-Ghali played in guiding the United Nations in the discharge of its responsibilities under the United Nations Charter. It also noted his efforts to find lasting solutions to conflicts around the world and commended the reforms he made in restructuring and strengthening the United Nations system.

The resolution acknowledge the contribution Boutros-Ghali had made to international peace and security, efforts to solve international problems, endeavours to meet humanitarian needs and his promotion of human rights and fundamental freedoms for all people. It concluded by expressing appreciation for his dedication to the provisions of the United Nations Charter and the development of friendly relations among countries.

It was the second time that a Security Council resolution had been adopted by acclamation.

== See also ==
- List of United Nations Security Council Resolutions 1001 to 1100 (1995–1997)
