= United Nations Security Council Resolution 1097 =

UN Security Council Resolution 1097
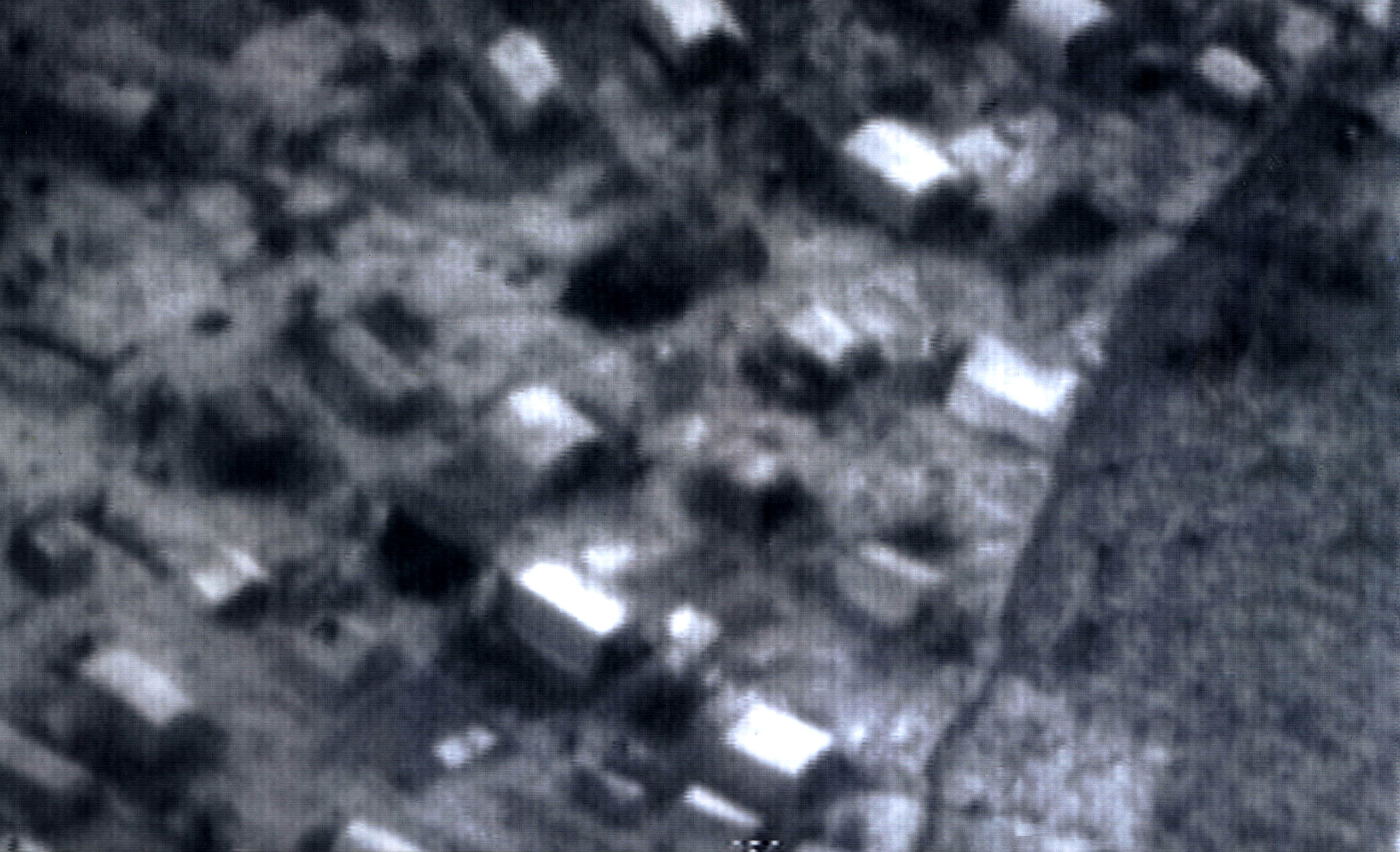
- Satellite image of refugee camp in eastern Zaire
- Date: 18 February 1997
- Meeting no.: 3,741
- Code: S/RES/1097 (Document)
- Subject: The situation in the Great Lakes region
- Voting summary: 15 voted for; None voted against; None abstained
- Result: Adopted

Security Council composition
- Permanent members: China; France; Russia; United Kingdom; United States
- Non-permanent members: Chile; Costa Rica; Egypt; Guinea-Bissau; Japan; Kenya; South Korea; Poland; Portugal; Sweden

United Nations Security Council resolution 1097, adopted unanimously on 18 February 1997, after expressing concern over the situation in the African Great Lakes region and for the safety of refugees and displaced persons, the Council endorsed a five-point peace plan to address the situation in eastern Zaire.

The Security Council underlined the obligation of all countries in the region to uphold international humanitarian law and the need for the countries to respect the sovereignty and territorial integrity of each other and refrain from interfering in each other's internal affairs.

The five-point peace plan for eastern Zaire, as expressed in a letter from the Secretary-General Kofi Annan, were endorsed as follows:

1. The immediate cessation of hostilities;
2. The withdrawal of mercenaries and other foreign forces;
3. The respect for the sovereignty and territorial integrity of Zaire and other states in the region;
4. The protection and security of all refugees and displaced persons, including access to humanitarian aid;
5. The settlement of the conflict through political dialogue and the convening of an international conference on peace and security in the Great Lakes region.

Finally, all governments and parties concerned were urged to co-operate with the joint United Nations/Organisation of African Unity Special Representative for the Great Lakes region, Mohamed Sahnoun, to achieve peace in the region.

== See also ==
- Burundi Civil War
- Great Lakes refugee crisis
- List of United Nations Security Council Resolutions 1001 to 1100 (1995–1997)
- Rwandan genocide
