= United Nations Security Council Resolution 1008 =

UN Security Council Resolution 1008
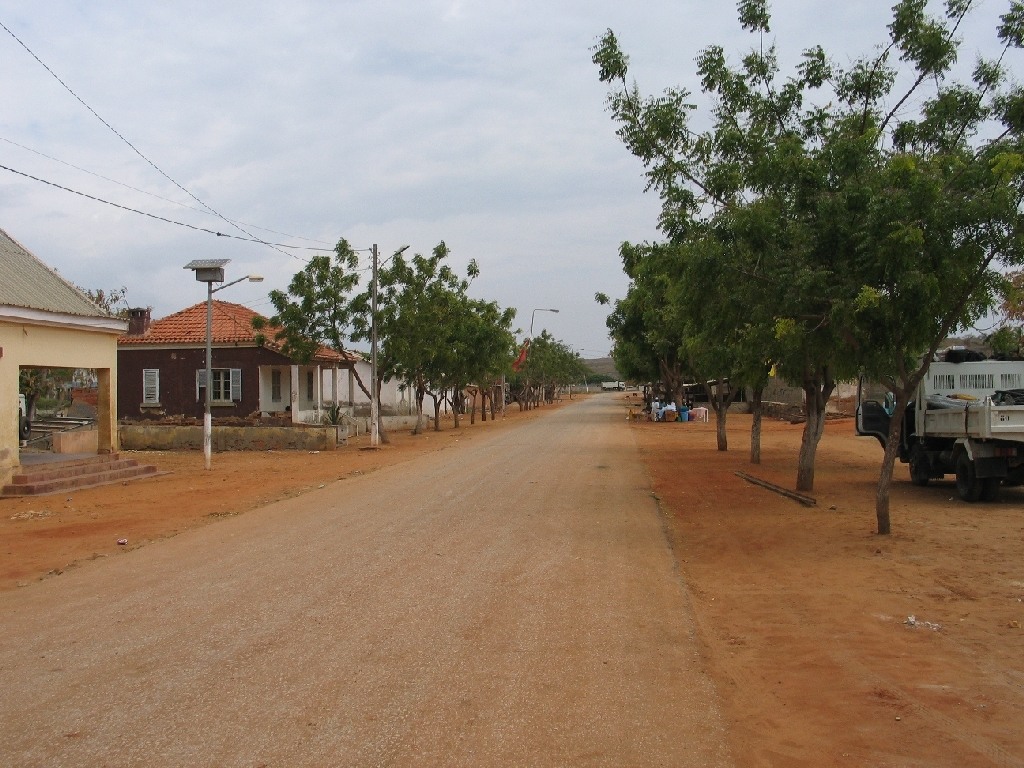
- Street in Angola
- Date: 7 August 1995
- Meeting no.: 3,562
- Code: S/RES/1008 (Document)
- Subject: Angola
- Voting summary: 15 voted for; None voted against; None abstained
- Result: Adopted

Security Council composition
- Permanent members: China; France; Russia; United Kingdom; United States
- Non-permanent members: Argentina; Botswana; Czech Republic; Germany; Honduras; Indonesia; Italy; Nigeria; Oman; Rwanda

United Nations Security Council resolution 1008, adopted unanimously on 7 August 1995, after reaffirming Resolution 696 (1991) and all subsequent resolutions on Angola, the Council discussed the monitoring of a ceasefire and implementation of peace accords, and extended the mandate of the United Nations Angola Verification Mission III (UNAVEM III) until 8 February 1996.

The Security Council reiterated the importance of the Accordos de Paz and Lusaka Protocol peace agreements between the Government of Angola and UNITA, of which both parties had agreed a timetable for implementing. The Council noted that the peace process in Angola had entered a new a promising phase with growing trust between the two parties; it was calm in most areas of the country though there were still a number of ceasefire violations. Human rights monitors and the deployment of United Nations military and police monitors had contributed significantly to the security situation in the country.

The commitment of both parties was commended but there was concern about the slow implementation of the Lusaka Protocol, and especially the dissolution of the troops, demining and the establishment of quartering areas. The importance of the electoral process was stressed and called for both parties to establish a timetable for the formation of new army, a prisoner of war exchange and repatriation of mercenaries.

The two parties were urged to put an end to the laying of land mines and to report unauthorised troop movements. It was also equally important for the population to be disarmed, the dissemination of objective information through Radio UNAVEM and the need to reach the full strength of UNAVEM III as soon as possible. Concern was expressed at violence by unaffiliated groups and called for measures to disarm them. The parties were called upon to allow access to all military facilities by UNAVEM III, and the Angolan government and UNITA also had to ensure that relief supplies could travel freely throughout the country.

Resolution 1008 concluded by asking for further contributions from member states and donors towards the reconstruction of Angola, particularly for roads, and for Secretary-General Boutros Boutros-Ghali to submit a report every two months on the situation in the country.

== See also ==
- Angolan Civil War
- List of United Nations Security Council Resolutions 1001 to 1100 (1995–1997)
- United Nations Angola Verification Mission I
- United Nations Angola Verification Mission II
