= United Nations Security Council Resolution 1033 =

UN Security Council Resolution 1033
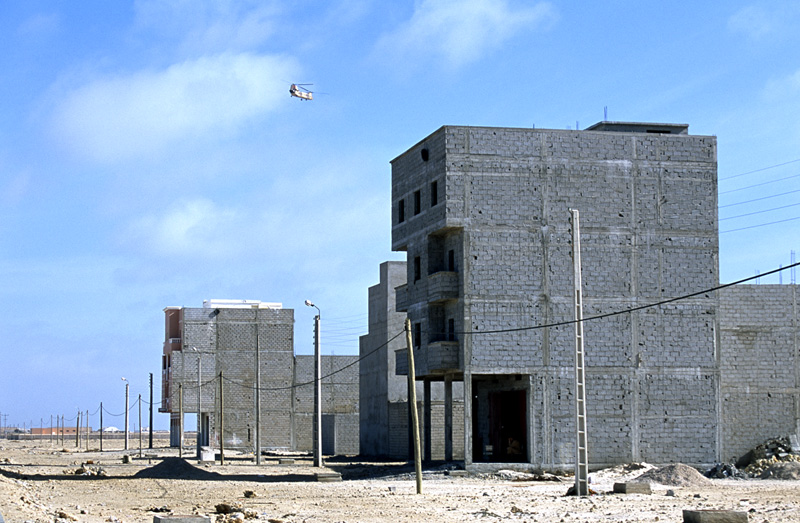
- Military transport helicopter over Western Sahara
- Date: 19 December 1995
- Meeting no.: 3,610
- Code: S/RES/1033 (Document)
- Subject: Western Sahara
- Voting summary: 15 voted for; None voted against; None abstained
- Result: Adopted

Security Council composition
- Permanent members: China; France; Russia; United Kingdom; United States
- Non-permanent members: Argentina; Botswana; Czech Republic; Germany; Honduras; Indonesia; Italy; Nigeria; Oman; Rwanda

United Nations Security Council resolution 1033, adopted unanimously on 19 December 1995, after reaffirming all previous resolutions on the Western Sahara, the Council discussed the referendum for self-determination of the people of Western Sahara and the completion of the identification process.

Receiving a report from the Secretary-General Boutros Boutros-Ghali pursuant to Resolution 1017 (1995), the Council stressed the need for progress to be made in the implementation of the Settlement Plan which had been accepted by Morocco and the Polisario Front and reiterated its commitment to holding a referendum. It was also noted that the Identification Commission could only carry out its work with the full trust of both parties in its judgement and integrity.

The Security Council welcomed the efforts of the Secretary-General in accelerating and completing the identification process, and also his consultations with both parties with the aim of resolving their differences delaying the completion of the process. A report on the consultations was requested, noting that, in the event of no agreement, the United Nations Mission for the Referendum in Western Sahara (MINURSO) could be withdrawn. Both parties were urged to co-operate with it.

== See also ==
- History of Western Sahara
- List of United Nations Security Council Resolutions 1001 to 1100 (1995–1997)
- Sahrawi Arab Democratic Republic
- Moroccan Western Sahara Wall
