= List of United Nations Security Council Resolutions 1001 to 1100 =

This is a list of United Nations Security Council Resolutions 1001 to 1100 adopted between 30 June 1995 and 27 March 1997.

Resolution	Date	Vote	Concerns
1001	30 June 1995	15–0–0	Extends mandate of the United Nations Observer Mission in Liberia; national reconciliation
1002	30 June 1995	15–0–0	Extends mandate of the United Nations Mission for the Referendum in Western Sahara; implementation of Settlement Plan
1003	5 July 1995	14–0–1 (abstention: Russia)	Further extends of partial suspension of sanctions against the Federal Republic of Yugoslavia (Serbia and Montenegro)
1004	12 July 1995	15–0–0	Demands withdrawal of Bosnian Serb forces from safe areas of Srebrenica, Bosnia and Herzegovina
1005	17 July 1995	15–0–0	Supply of explosives for use in demining in Rwanda
1006	28 July 1995	15–0–0	Extends mandate of the United Nations Interim Force in Lebanon
1007	31 July 1995	15–0–0	Extends mandate of the United Nations Mission in Haiti; national reconciliation
1008	7 August 1995	15–0–0	Extends mandate of the United Nations Angola Verification Mission III; monitoring of ceasefire
1009	10 August 1995	15–0–0	Compliance of Croatia with United Nations Protection Force agreement; right of local Serb population to receive humanitarian aid
1010	10 August 1995	15–0–0	Access by international agencies to Srebrenica and Žepa; release of detained persons in Bosnia and Herzegovina
1011	16 August 1995	15–0–0	Suspends arms embargo against Rwandan government
1012	28 August 1995	15–0–0	Establishes an international commission inquiry in Burundi
1013	7 September 1995	15–0–0	Establishes an international commission inquiry concerning arms flows to former Rwandan government forces in Great Lakes region
1014	15 September 1995	15–0–0	Extends mandate of the United Nations Observer Mission in Liberia
1015	15 September 1995	15–0–0	Further suspends sanctions against Serbia and Montenegro
1016	21 September 1995	15–0–0	Military and humanitarian situation in Bosnia and Herzegovina
1017	22 September 1995	15–0–0	Extends mandate of the United Nations Mission for the Referendum in Western Sahara
1018	7 November 1995	15–0–0	Election and vacancy at the International Court of Justice
1019	9 November 1995	15–0–0	Violations of international humanitarian law in the former Yugoslavia
1020	10 November 1995	15–0–0	Adjusts mandate of the United Nations Observer Mission in Liberia; implementation of peace process
1021	22 November 1995	14–0–1 (abstention: Russia)	Termination of arms embargo upon signing of peace agreement in the former Yugoslavia
1022	22 November 1995	14–0–1 (abstention: Russia)	Suspends measures in previous resolutions related to the former Yugoslavia
1023	22 November 1995	15–0–0	Agreement between Government of Croatia and local Serb representatives
1024	28 November 1995	15–0–0	Extends mandate of the United Nations Disengagement Observer Force
1025	30 November 1995	15–0–0	Proposal for termination of the United Nations Confidence Restoration Operation in Croatia
1026	30 November 1995	15–0–0	Extends mandate of the United Nations Protection Force
1027	30 November 1995	15–0–0	Extends mandate of the United Nations Preventive Deployment Force
1028	8 December 1995	15–0–0	Extends mandate of the United Nations Assistance Mission for Rwanda
1029	12 December 1995	15–0–0	Extends and adjusts mandate of the United Nations Assistance Mission for Rwanda; safe repatriation of refugees
1030	14 December 1995	15–0–0	Extends mandate of the United Nations Mission of Observers in Tajikistan
1031	15 December 1995	15–0–0	Implementation of peace agreement for Bosnia and Herzegovina; transfer from United Nations Protection Force to Implementation Force
1032	19 December 1995	15–0–0	Extends mandate of the United Nations Peacekeeping Force in Cyprus; restoration of confidence
1033	19 December 1995	15–0–0	Referendum for self-determination of the people of Western Sahara; completion of identification process
1034	21 December 1995	15–0–0	Violations of international humanitarian law and human rights in the former Yugoslavia
1035	21 December 1995	15–0–0	Establishes the International Police Task Force and civilian office for implementation of peace agreement in Bosnia and Herzegovina
1036	12 January 1996	15–0–0	Extends mandate of the United Nations Observer Mission in Georgia
1037	15 January 1996	15–0–0	Establishes the United Nations Transitional Authority for Eastern Slavonia, Baranja and Western Sirmium
1038	15 January 1996	15–0–0	Authorises military observers to monitor demobilisation in the Prevlaka peninsula
1039	29 January 1996	15–0–0	Extends mandate of the United Nations Interim Force in Lebanon
1040	29 January 1996	15–0–0	Deteriorating situation in the civil war and efforts for political dialogue in Burundi
1041	29 January 1996	15–0–0	Extends mandate of the United Nations Observer Mission in Liberia; efforts to restore stability
1042	31 January 1996	15–0–0	Extends mandate of the United Nations Mission for the Referendum in Western Sahara; implementation of Settlement Plan
1043	31 January 1996	15–0–0	Deploys 100 military observers as part of the United Nations Transitional Authority for Eastern Slavonia, Baranja and Western Sirmium
1044	31 January 1996	15–0–0	Calls on Sudan to extradite three suspects to Ethiopia over assassination attempt on Egyptian President Hosni Mubarak
1045	8 February 1996	15–0–0	Extends mandate of the United Nations Angola Verification Mission III
1046	13 February 1996	15–0–0	Increases strength of the United Nations Preventive Deployment Force
1047	29 February 1996	15–0–0	Appoints Louise Arbour as Prosecutor at the International Criminal Tribunal for Rwanda and former Yugoslavia
1048	29 February 1996	15–0–0	Extends mandate of the United Nations Mission in Haiti; reduction of size
1049	5 March 1996	15–0–0	Preparations for regional conference on security in the African Great Lakes region; Great Lakes refugee crisis
1050	8 March 1996	15–0–0	Arrangements for withdrawal of the United Nations Assistance Mission for Rwanda
1051	27 March 1996	15–0–0	Mechanism for monitoring Iraqi imports and exports of "dual use" items
1052	18 April 1996	15–0–0	Calls for ceasefire in 1996 Lebanon war
1053	23 April 1996	15–0–0	Findings of commission of inquiry concerning violations of arms embargo on former Rwandan government forces
1054	26 April 1996	13–0–2 (abstentions: China, Russia)	Sanctions Sudan for non-compliance with Resolution 1044
1055	8 May 1996	15–0–0	Extends mandate of the United Nations Angola Verification Mission III; efforts to advance peace progress
1056	29 May 1996	15–0–0	Extends mandate of the United Nations Mission for the Referendum in Western Sahara; conditions for referendum
1057	30 May 1996	15–0–0	Extends mandate of the United Nations Disengagement Observer Force
1058	30 May 1996	14–0–1 (abstention: Russia)	Extends mandate of the United Nations Preventive Deployment Force
1059	31 May 1996	15–0–0	Extends mandate of the United Nations Observer Mission in Liberia; security situation
1060	12 June 1996	15–0–0	Iraq's refusal to allow inspection teams to sites designated by the United Nations Special Commission
1061	14 June 1996	15–0–0	Extends mandate of the United Nations Mission of Observers in Tajikistan; situation on Tajik-Afghan border
1062	28 June 1996	15–0–0	Extends mandate of the United Nations Peacekeeping Force in Cyprus; restoration of confidence
1063	28 June 1996	15–0–0	Establishes the United Nations Support Mission in Haiti
1064	11 July 1996	15–0–0	Extends mandate of the United Nations Angola Verification Mission III; peace process
1065	12 July 1996	15–0–0	Extends mandate of the United Nations Observer Mission in Georgia
1066	15 July 1996	15–0–0	Authorises continued observation of demilitarisation of Prevlaka peninsula by military observers
1067	26 July 1996	13–0–2 (abstentions: China, Russia)	Condemns Cuba for shootdown of two civilian aircraft following International Civil Aviation Organization report
1068	30 July 1996	15–0–0	Extends mandate of the United Nations Interim Force in Lebanon
1069	30 July 1996	15–0–0	Extends mandate of observers of the United Nations Transitional Authority for Eastern Slavonia, Baranja and Western Sirmium
1070	16 August 1996	13–0–2 (abstentions: China, Russia)	Imposes aviation sanctions against Sudan to enforce compliance with resolution 1044 and 1054
1071	30 August 1996	15–0–0	Extends mandate of the United Nations Observer Mission in Liberia
1072	30 August 1996	15–0–0	Political settlement of situation in Burundi during civil war
1073	28 September 1996	14–0–1 (abstention: United States)	Situation in Jerusalem, Nablus, Ramallah, Bethlehem and the Gaza Strip
1074	1 October 1996	15–0–0	Terminates measures against the former Yugoslavia following elections in Bosnia and Herzegovina
1075	11 October 1996	15–0–0	Extends mandate of the United Nations Angola Verification Mission III; peace process
1076	22 October 1996	15–0–0	Political, military and humanitarian situation in Afghanistan
1077	22 October 1996	14–0–1 (abstention: China)	Establishes Human Rights Office as part of the United Nations Observer Mission in Georgia
1078	9 November 1996	15–0–0	Proposals for international conference on peace, security and development in African Great Lakes region; Great Lakes refugee crisis
1079	15 November 1996	15–0–0	Extends mandate of the United Nations Transitional Authority for Eastern Slavonia, Baranja and Western Sirmium
1080	15 November 1996	15–0–0	Establishes multinational humanitarian intervention force in the African Great Lakes region
1081	27 November 1996	15–0–0	Extends mandate of the United Nations Disengagement Observer Force
1082	27 November 1996	15–0–0	Extends mandate of the United Nations Preventive Deployment Force
1083	27 November 1996	15–0–0	Extends mandate of the United Nations Observer Mission in Liberia
1084	27 November 1996	15–0–0	Extends mandate of the United Nations Mission for the Referendum in Western Sahara; implementation of Settlement Plan
1085	29 November 1996	15–0–0	Extends mandate of the United Nations Support Mission in Haiti
1086	5 December 1996	15–0–0	Extends mandate of the United Nations Support Mission in Haiti
1087	11 December 1996	15–0–0	Extends mandate of the United Nations Angola Verification Mission III
1088	12 December 1996	15–0–0	Authorises creation of the Stabilisation Force in Bosnia and Herzegovina
1089	13 December 1996	15–0–0	Extends mandate of the United Nations Mission of Observers in Tajikistan
1090	13 December 1996	Adopted without vote	Appointment of Kofi Annan as Secretary-General of the United Nations
1091	13 December 1996	Adopted without vote	Acknowledges contribution of Secretary-General Boutros Boutros-Ghali
1092	23 December 1996	15–0–0	Extends mandate of the United Nations Peacekeeping Force in Cyprus
1093	14 January 1997	15–0–0	Monitoring of the demobilisation of the Prevlaka peninsula
1094	20 January 1997	15–0–0	Deploys military observers as part of United Nations Verification Mission in Guatemala
1095	28 January 1997	15–0–0	Extends mandate of the United Nations Interim Force in Lebanon
1096	30 January 1997	15–0–0	Extends mandate of the United Nations Observer Mission in Georgia
1097	18 February 1997	15–0–0	Five point peace plan for eastern Zaire
1098	27 February 1997	15–0–0	Extends mandate of the United Nations Angola Verification Mission III; establishment of Government of Unity
1099	14 March 1997	15–0–0	Extends mandate of the United Nations Mission of Observers in Tajikistan
1100	27 March 1997	15–0–0	Extends mandate of the United Nations Observer Mission in Liberia

== See also ==
- Lists of United Nations Security Council resolutions
- List of United Nations Security Council Resolutions 901 to 1000
- List of United Nations Security Council Resolutions 1101 to 1200
