= United Nations Security Council Resolution 1026 =

UN Security Council Resolution 1026
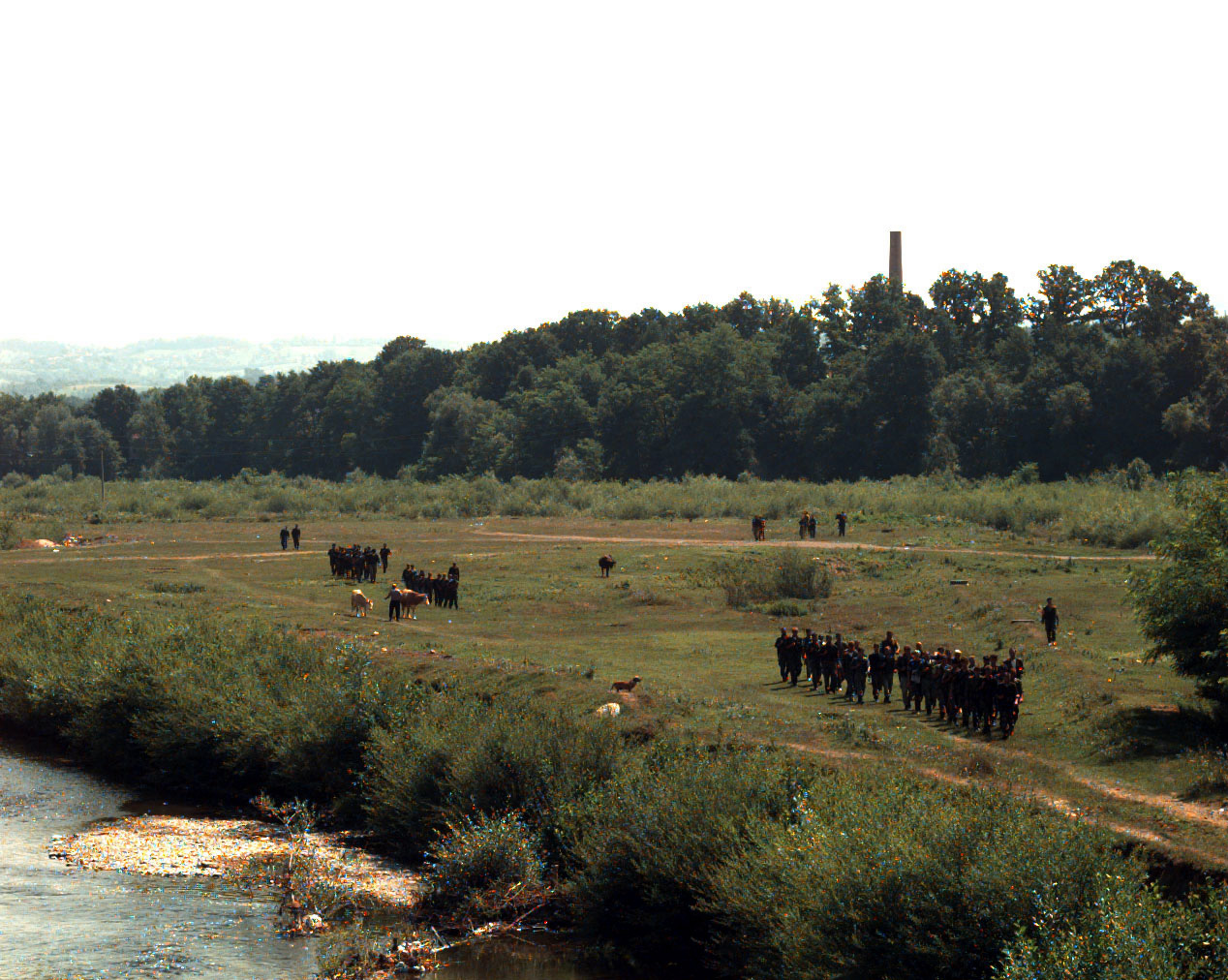
- Croatian soldiers near Jelah, Bosnia and Herzegovina
- Date: 30 November 1995
- Meeting no.: 3,601
- Code: S/RES/1026 (Document)
- Subject: Bosnia and Herzegovina
- Voting summary: 15 voted for; None voted against; None abstained
- Result: Adopted

Security Council composition
- Permanent members: China; France; Russia; United Kingdom; United States
- Non-permanent members: Argentina; Botswana; Czech Republic; Germany; Honduras; Indonesia; Italy; Nigeria; Oman; Rwanda

United Nations Security Council resolution 1026, adopted unanimously on 30 November 1995, after recalling resolutions 982 (1995) and 998 (1995) on the United Nations Protection Force (UNPROFOR), the Council authorised an extension of its mandate until 31 January 1996.

The Council again welcomed the Dayton Agreement between Bosnia and Herzegovina, Croatia and the Federal Republic of Yugoslavia (Serbia and Montenegro) and stressed the need for all parties to abide by that agreement. The role of UNPROFOR was also praised.

Acting under Chapter VII of the United Nations Charter, the Security Council extended UNPROFOR's mandate until 31 January 1996 pending further action on the implementation of the Dayton Agreement. The Secretary-General Boutros Boutros-Ghali was invited to keep the Council informed on developments and submit reports on the implementation of the agreement and how it would affect the United Nations role.

== See also ==
- Bosnian War
- Breakup of Yugoslavia
- Croatian War of Independence
- List of United Nations Security Council Resolutions 1001 to 1100 (1995–1997)
- Yugoslav Wars
