= United Nations Security Council Resolution 1061 =

UN Security Council Resolution 1061
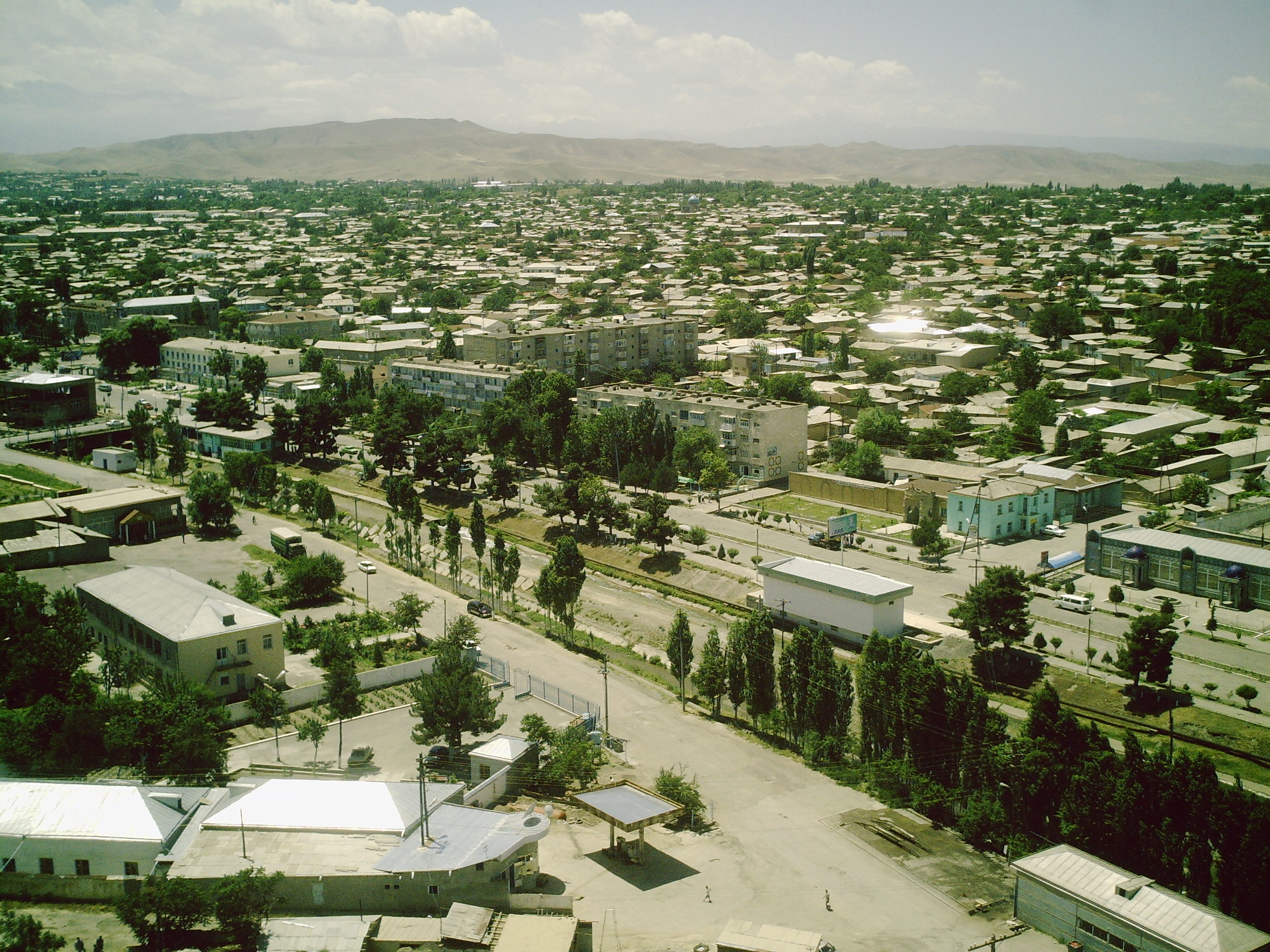
- Istarawshan in northwestern Tajikistan
- Date: 14 June 1996
- Meeting no.: 3,673
- Code: S/RES/1061 (Document)
- Subject: The situation in Tajikistan and along the Tajik–Afghan border
- Voting summary: 15 voted for; None voted against; None abstained
- Result: Adopted

Security Council composition
- Permanent members: China; France; Russia; United Kingdom; United States
- Non-permanent members: Botswana; Chile; Egypt; Guinea-Bissau; Germany; Honduras; Indonesia; Italy; South Korea; Poland

United Nations Security Council resolution 1061, adopted unanimously on 14 June 1996, after recalling all resolutions on the situation in Tajikistan and the Tajik-Afghan border, the Council extended the mandate of the United Nations Mission of Observers in Tajikistan (UNMOT) until 15 December 1996 and addressed efforts to end the conflict in the country.

There was concern about the deteriorating situation in Tajikistan, and the Security Council emphasised the need for the parties concerned to uphold their agreements. The situation would only be resolved through political means between the Government of Tajikistan and the United Tajik Opposition and it was their primary responsibility to do so. The resolution also stressed the unacceptability of hostile acts on the border with Afghanistan.

The parties were called to end hostilities and comply with the Tehran Agreement, strongly urging the extension of a ceasefire during the inter-Tajik talks. UNMOT's mandate was extended until 15 December 1996 on the condition that the Tehran Agreement and the ceasefire remained in force. The role of the United Nations in the country would be reviewed if there were no prospects for peace during the mandate period.

Every three months, the Secretary-General was requested to report on the implementation of the Tehran Agreement and the progress and operations of UNMOT. Finally, all countries were called upon to provide humanitarian assistance to Tajikistan by way of a voluntary fund established in Resolution 968 (1994).

== See also ==
- Tajikistani Civil War
- History of Tajikistan
- List of United Nations Security Council Resolutions 1001 to 1100 (1995–1997)
