= United Nations Security Council Resolution 1074 =

UN Security Council Resolution 1074
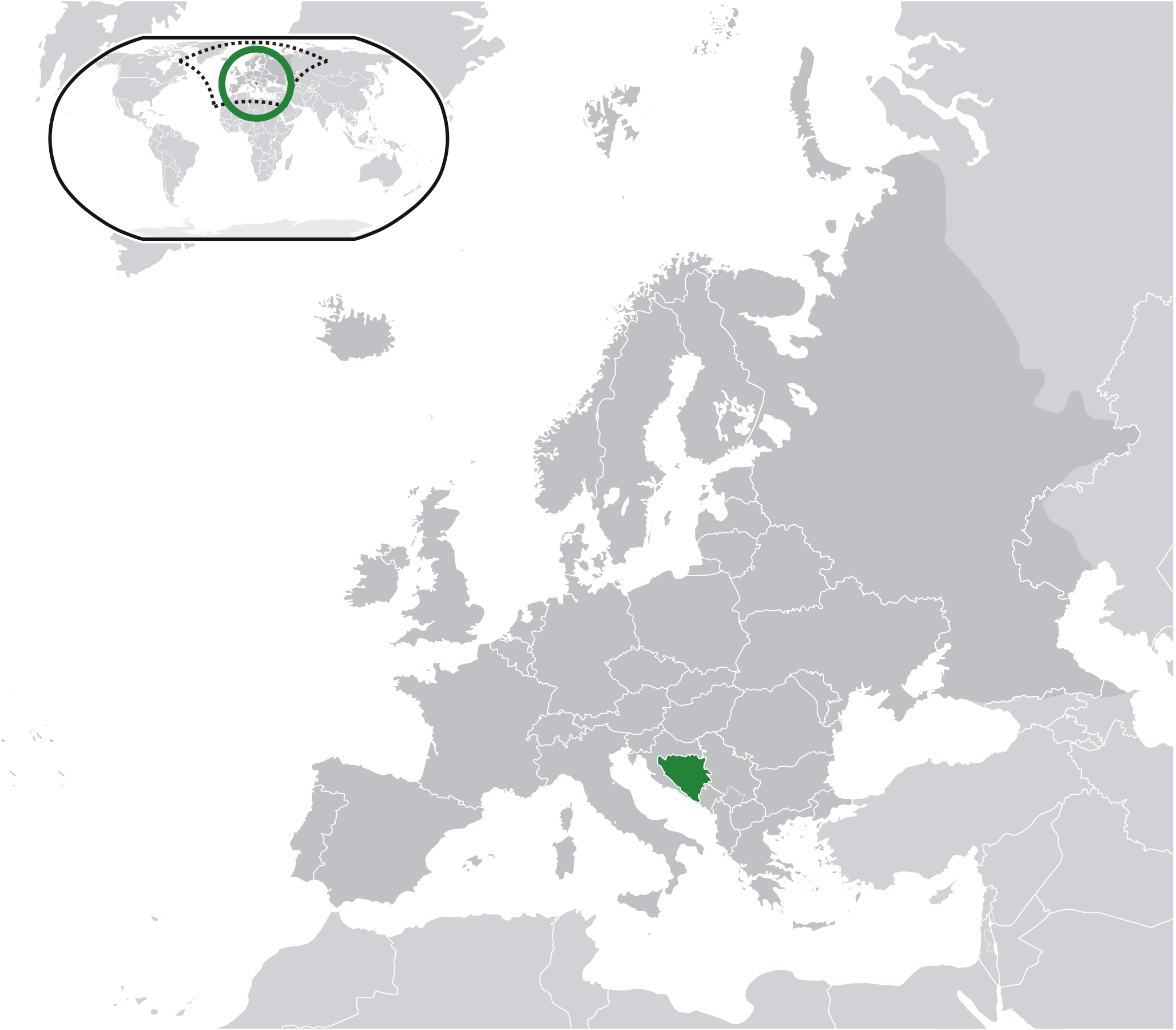
- Bosnia and Herzegovina
- Date: 1 October 1996
- Meeting no.: 3,700
- Code: S/RES/1074 (Document)
- Subject: The situation in former Yugoslavia
- Voting summary: 15 voted for; None voted against; None abstained
- Result: Adopted

Security Council composition
- Permanent members: China; France; Russia; United Kingdom; United States
- Non-permanent members: Botswana; Chile; Egypt; Guinea-Bissau; Germany; Honduras; Indonesia; Italy; South Korea; Poland

United Nations Security Council resolution 1074, adopted unanimously on 1 October 1996, after recalling all resolutions on the conflicts in the former Yugoslavia and in particular Resolution 1022 (1995), the Council terminated all remaining measures against the Federal Republic of Yugoslavia from previous resolutions with immediate effect.

The implementation of the Dayton Agreement for Bosnia and Herzegovina had improved and was welcomed, along with the mutual recognition and establishment of diplomatic relations amongst all states of the former Yugoslavia. As part of the agreement, it was essential that all countries cooperated with the International Criminal Tribunal for the former Yugoslavia (ICTY). It was also noted that elections had taken place in Bosnia and Herzegovina.

Acting under Chapter VII of the United Nations Charter, the Council noted that the elections contributed a significant step towards the implementation of the peace agreement and authorised the termination of international sanctions against states in the former Yugoslavia. All parties were urged to abide by their commitments and noted it would keep the situation under review, and measures would be re-imposed if any party failed to meet its obligations under the agreement.

Finally, the committee established under Resolution 724 (1991) was to be dissolved once its report had been finalised. The committee had held 141 meetings before it was ended on 15 November 1996.

== See also ==
- Bosnian War
- Breakup of Yugoslavia
- Croatian War of Independence
- List of United Nations Security Council Resolutions 1001 to 1100 (1995–1997)
- Yugoslav Wars
- List of United Nations Security Council Resolutions related to the conflicts in former Yugoslavia
