= United Nations Security Council Resolution 1078 =

UN Security Council Resolution 1078
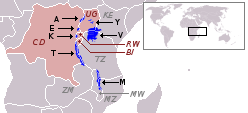
- African Great Lakes region
- Date: 9 November 1996
- Meeting no.: 3,710
- Code: S/RES/1078 (Document)
- Subject: The situation in the Great Lakes region
- Voting summary: 15 voted for; None voted against; None abstained
- Result: Adopted

Security Council composition
- Permanent members: China; France; Russia; United Kingdom; United States
- Non-permanent members: Botswana; Chile; Egypt; Guinea-Bissau; Germany; Honduras; Indonesia; Italy; South Korea; Poland

United Nations Security Council resolution 1078, adopted unanimously on 9 November 1996, after expressing concern at the situation in the African Great Lakes region, the Council discussed proposals for a regional conference on security and a multinational humanitarian force in eastern Zaire.

== Background ==
Ethnic conflicts in Rwanda and Burundi had already caused hundreds of thousands of deaths and a massive displacement of refugees, with many fleeing to neighbouring Zaire (now the Democratic Republic of the Congo). With this in mind, the Security Council was concerned that the region would become destabilised.

== Resolutions ==
There was concern about the deteriorating situation in the Great Lakes region and eastern Zaire in particular. The humanitarian situation and the large displacement of refugees was also of concern. The regional leaders were requested to establish safe corridors and temporary sanctuaries by deploying a neutral force.

The Security Council condemned the violence and called for an immediate ceasefire. The countries in the region were also invited to create circumstances in which a peaceful solution could be reached and the voluntary repatriation of refugees was essential for regional stability. The humanitarian crisis in eastern Zaire was a threat to regional peace and stability.

The Secretary-General Boutros Boutros-Ghali proposed that a multinational force to be set up for humanitarian purposes in eastern Zaire. Countries in the region were asked to create a safe and secure environment to facilitate the delivery of international humanitarian aid to the region, and to desist from actions that could escalate the situation. They were asked to co-operate with him and the Organisation of African Unity (OAU) and consult with each other on his proposal on the authorisation of a multinational force. The Secretary-General was then asked to:

(a) draw up an operational concept of a humanitarian task force with the following goals:

- provide short-term humanitarian assistance and shelter to refugees;
- contribute to the protection and voluntary return of refugees;
- open humanitarian corridors;

(b) seek co-operation from the Government of Rwanda for further measures including the deployment of observers to build confidence;
(c) report to the Council with recommendations no later than 20 November 1996.

Additionally, the Secretary-General was urgently required, in co-ordination with the OAU and the countries concerned, to determine the modalities of an international conference on peace, security and development in the Great Lakes region. They were also asked to seek ways to reduce tension.

== See also ==
- Burundi Civil War
- Great Lakes refugee crisis
- List of United Nations Security Council Resolutions 1001 to 1100 (1995–1997)
- Rwandan genocide
