= United Nations Security Council Resolution 1059 =

UN Security Council Resolution 1059
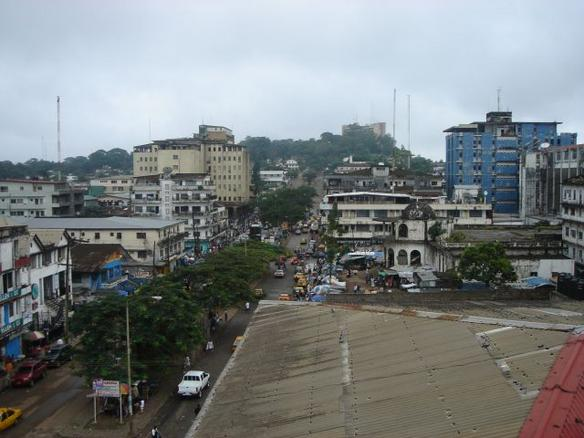
- Liberian capital Monrovia
- Date: 31 May 1996
- Meeting no.: 3,671
- Code: S/RES/1059 (Document)
- Subject: The situation in Liberia
- Voting summary: 15 voted for; None voted against; None abstained
- Result: Adopted

Security Council composition
- Permanent members: China; France; Russia; United Kingdom; United States
- Non-permanent members: Botswana; Chile; Egypt; Guinea-Bissau; Germany; Honduras; Indonesia; Italy; South Korea; Poland

United Nations Security Council resolution 1059, adopted unanimously on 31 May 1996, after recalling all resolutions on the situation in Liberia, particularly Resolution 1041 (1996), the Council extended the mandate of the United Nations Observer Mission in Liberia (UNOMIL) until 31 August 1996 and discussed the security situation in the country.

The violence in Liberia had escalated in violation of the Abuja Agreement, and the Security Council stressed the importance of the capital Monrovia as a safe zone. The observance of the ceasefire had ended and hostilities were resumed, including in the capital. While the Economic Community of West African States Monitoring Group (ECOMOG) had deployed more troops in the city, the Economic Community of West African States (ECOWAS) had adopted a mechanism for the resumption of the implementation of the Abuja Accord.

The security council extended the mandate of the UNOMIL observation force in Liberia until 31 August 1996, and due to the deteriorating security situation, its size was temporarily downsized on the orders of the Secretary-General Boutros Boutros-Ghali. All attacks against ECOMOG (the ECOWAS peacekeeping force), UNOMIL and the humanitarian relief agencies, as well as the looting of their property was condemned. The parties were invited to abide by their agreements, observing the ceasefire and withdrawing from Monrovia. All countries were reminded to observe the arms embargo against Liberia imposed in Resolution 788 (1992) and report violations to the committee established in Resolution 985 (1995).

Resolution 1059 concluded by supporting the stance of ECOWAS with respect to not recognising any government that came to power in Liberia through the use of force. Further measures would be considered against those who continuously violated Security Council resolutions.

== See also ==
- Abuja Accord (Liberia)
- Charles Taylor
- First Liberian Civil War
- List of United Nations Security Council Resolutions 1001 to 1100 (1995–1997)
