= United Nations Security Council Resolution 1046 =

UN Security Council Resolution 1046
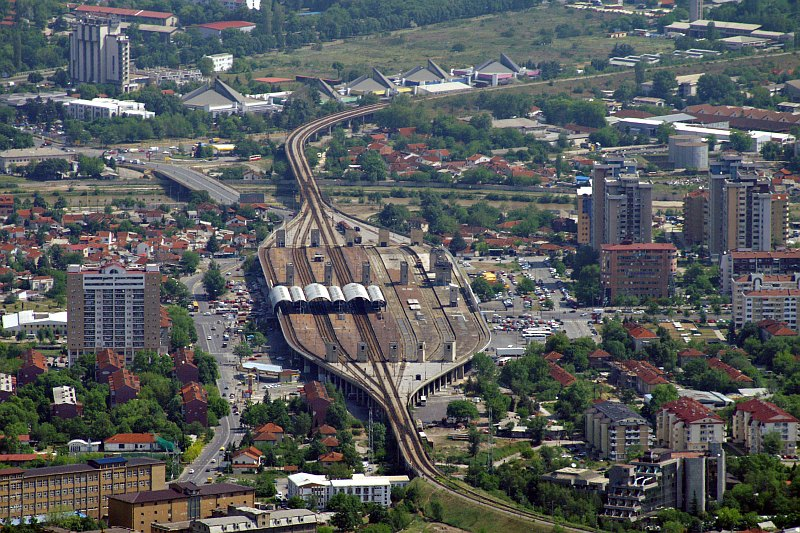
- Macedonian capital Skopje
- Date: 13 February 1996
- Meeting no.: 3,630
- Code: S/RES/1046 (Document)
- Subject: The situation in the former Yugoslav Republic of Macedonia
- Voting summary: 15 voted for; None voted against; None abstained
- Result: Adopted

Security Council composition
- Permanent members: China; France; Russia; United Kingdom; United States
- Non-permanent members: Botswana; Chile; Egypt; Guinea-Bissau; Germany; Honduras; Indonesia; Italy; South Korea; Poland

United Nations Security Council resolution 1046, adopted unanimously on 13 February 1996, after recalling previous resolutions including Resolution 1027 (1995) on the extension of the United Nations Preventive Deployment Force (UNPREDEP) until 30 May 1996, the Council authorised an increase in strength of UNPREDEP of an additional 50 military personnel for support in its operations.

The council also authorised the establishment of the position of Force Commander of UNPREDEP, and requested the Secretary-General to report by 20 May 1996 on the situation in the region and matters relating to UNPREDEP.

== See also ==
- Bosnian War
- Breakup of Yugoslavia
- Croatian War of Independence
- List of United Nations Security Council Resolutions 1001 to 1100 (1995–1997)
- Yugoslav Wars
- List of United Nations Security Council Resolutions related to the conflicts in former Yugoslavia
