= United Nations Security Council Resolution 1040 =

UN Security Council Resolution 1040
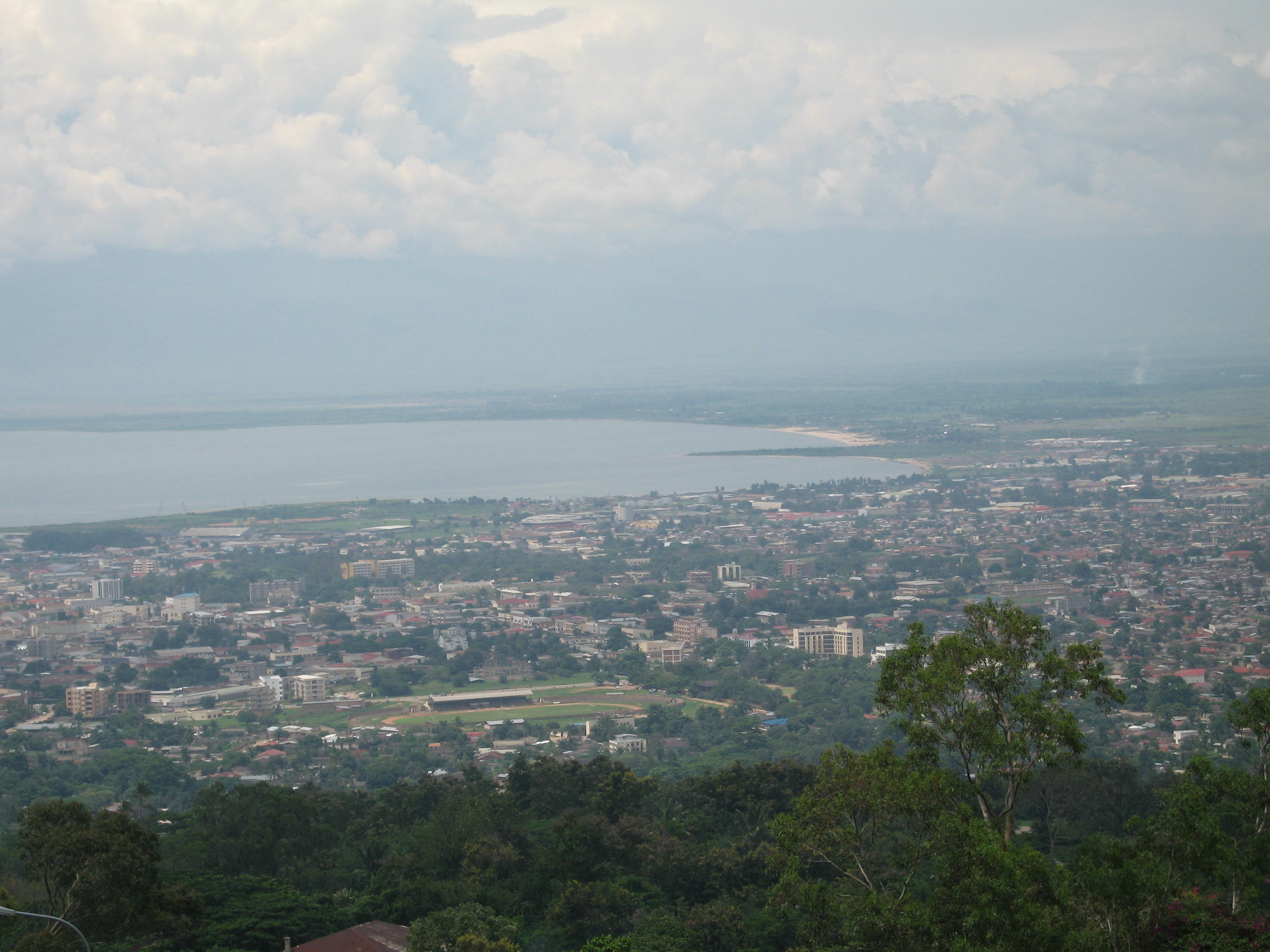
- Burundi's capital Bujumbura
- Date: 29 January 1996
- Meeting no.: 3,623
- Code: S/RES/1040 (Document)
- Subject: The situation in Burundi
- Voting summary: 15 voted for; None voted against; None abstained
- Result: Adopted

Security Council composition
- Permanent members: China; France; Russia; United Kingdom; United States
- Non-permanent members: Botswana; Chile; Egypt; Guinea-Bissau; Germany; Honduras; Indonesia; Italy; South Korea; Poland

United Nations Security Council resolution 1040, adopted unanimously on 29 January 1996, after considering letters by the Secretary-General Boutros Boutros-Ghali and statements by the President of the Security Council, the Council addressed the civil war in Burundi and efforts for political dialogue.

The Security Council was concerned that the situation in Burundi had deteriorated and threatened stability in the region. Violence had increased, particularly against refugees and international humanitarian aid workers, and the importance of continued assistance to refugees was stressed. The United Nations High Commissioner for Refugees had recently visited the country and there were security plans being drawn up.

The resolution demanded that all parties in Burundi refrain from violence and the use of force, and to pursue dialogue. Member States and others concerned were urged to cooperate with the dismantling of radio stations inciting hatred and violence. Further measures would be considered, in consultation with the Organisation of African Unity and other countries. The Secretary-General had sent a technical mission to Burundi to examine ways to protect United Nations personnel and aid agencies and was asked by 20 February 1996 to report on that mission, the overall situation and progress of the dialogue. On the basis of the report, the council would consider further measures, including an arms embargo and travel restrictions against leaders in Burundi.

== See also ==
- Burundi Civil War
- History of Burundi
- List of United Nations Security Council Resolutions 1001 to 1100 (1995–1997)
