= United Nations Security Council Resolution 1027 =

UN Security Council Resolution 1027
- Macedonia (highlighted) within the former Yugoslavia
- Date: 30 November 1995
- Meeting no.: 3,602
- Code: S/RES/1027 (Document)
- Subject: Macedonia
- Voting summary: 15 voted for; None voted against; None abstained
- Result: Adopted

Security Council composition
- Permanent members: China; France; Russia; United Kingdom; United States
- Non-permanent members: Argentina; Botswana; Czech Republic; Germany; Honduras; Indonesia; Italy; Nigeria; Oman; Rwanda

United Nations Security Council resolution 1027 was adopted unanimously on 30 November 1995. This occurred after recalling previous resolutions including Resolution 983 (1995) on Macedonia. The Council extended the mandate of the United Nations Preventive Deployment Force (UNPREDEP) until 30 May 1996.

The Security Council reaffirmed its commitment to the independence, sovereignty and territorial integrity of Macedonia and reiterated concern about any developments that could threaten its stability. In this regard, the mandate of UNPREDEP was extended until 30 May 1996 and urged it to continue co-operation with the Organization for Security and Co-operation in Europe. Requests from the Secretary-General to provide assistance to UNPREDEP were asked to be considered favourably. By 31 January 1996, the Secretary-General Boutros Boutros-Ghali was requested to report to the Council concerning any developments affecting the mandate of UNPREDEP.

== See also ==
- Bosnian War
- Breakup of Yugoslavia
- Croatian War of Independence
- List of United Nations Security Council Resolutions 1001 to 1100 (1995–1997)
- Yugoslav Wars
- List of United Nations Security Council Resolutions related to the conflicts in former Yugoslavia
