= United Nations Security Council Resolution 1660 =

UN Security Council Resolution 1660
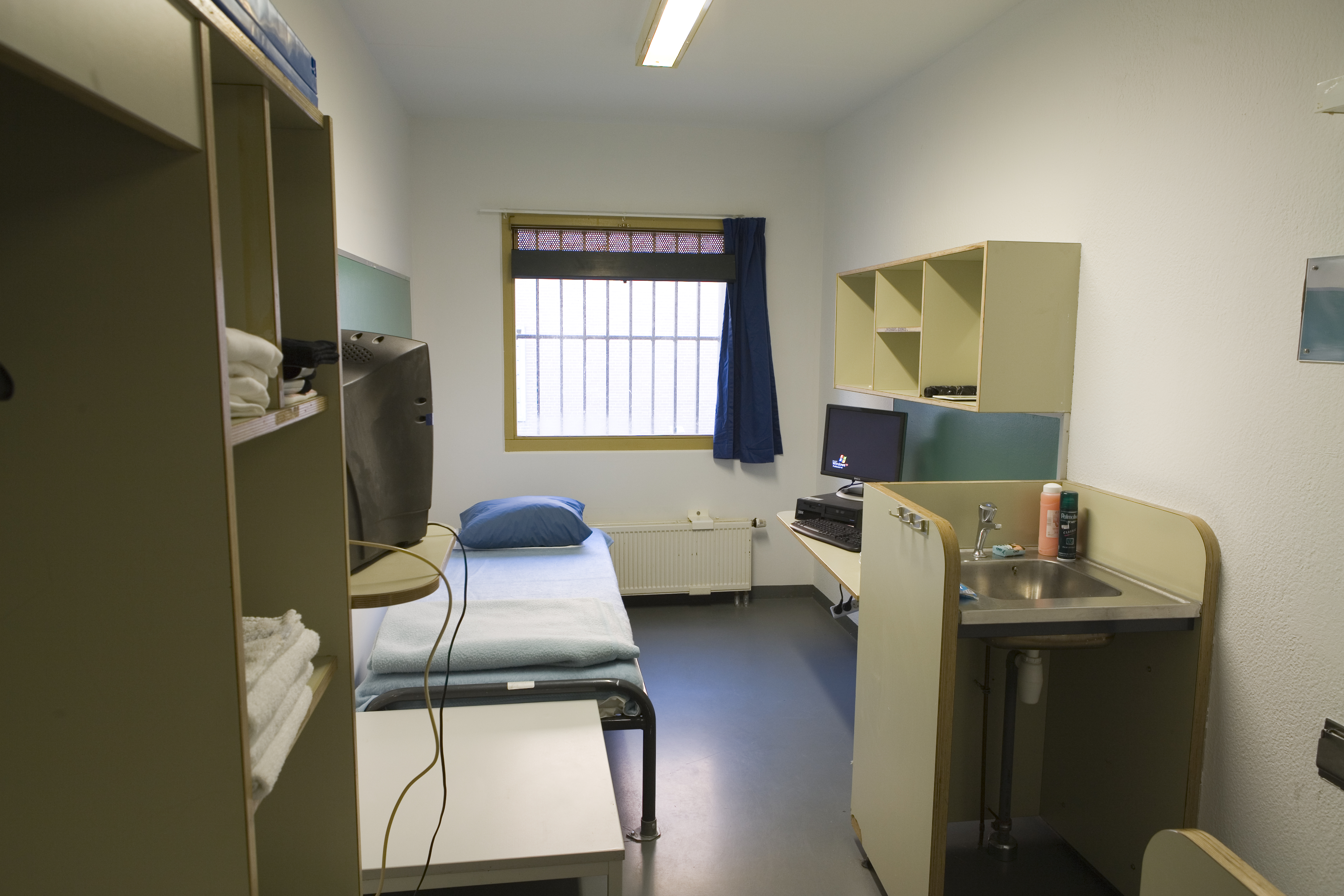
- Detention unit at the ICTY (Photograph provided courtesy of the ICTY)
- Date: 28 February 2006
- Meeting no.: 5,382
- Code: S/RES/1660 (Document)
- Subject: The International Criminal Tribunal for the former Yugoslavia
- Voting summary: 15 voted for; None voted against; None abstained
- Result: Adopted

Security Council composition
- Permanent members: China; France; Russia; United Kingdom; United States
- Non-permanent members: Argentina; Rep. of the Congo; Denmark; Ghana; Greece; Japan; Peru; Qatar; Slovakia; Tanzania

United Nations Security Council Resolution 1660, adopted unanimously on February 28, 2006, after recalling resolutions 827 (1993), 1166 (1996), 1329 (2000), 1411 (2002), 1431 (2002), 1481 (2003), 1503 (2003), 1534 (2004) and 1597 (2005), the Council amended the statute of the International Criminal Tribunal for the former Yugoslavia (ICTY) concerning the appointment of reserve judges.

The Council was convinced by a proposal from the President of the ICTY that the Secretary-General appoint reserve judges from among the temporary judges to be present at each stage of a trial that they had been appointed to, and if necessary, replace the presiding judge if that judge is unable to continue sitting. Under Chapter VII of the United Nations Charter, the Council modified the statute of the Tribunal accordingly.

The number of temporary judges was also increased from nine to twelve.

== See also ==
- List of United Nations Security Council Resolutions 1601 to 1700 (2005–2006)
- Yugoslav Wars
- List of United Nations Security Council Resolutions related to the conflicts in former Yugoslavia
