= United Nations Security Council Resolution 1613 =

UN Security Council Resolution 1613
- Flag of the former Yugoslavia
- Date: 26 July 2005
- Meeting no.: 5,236
- Code: S/RES/1613 (Document)
- Subject: The International Criminal Tribunal for the former Yugoslavia
- Voting summary: 15 voted for; None voted against; None abstained
- Result: Adopted

Security Council composition
- Permanent members: China; France; Russia; United Kingdom; United States
- Non-permanent members: Algeria; Argentina; Benin; Brazil; Denmark; Greece; Japan; Philippines; Romania; Tanzania

United Nations Security Council Resolution 1613, adopted unanimously on 26 July 2005, after recalling resolutions 827 (1993), 1166 (1998), 1329 (2000), 1411 (2002), 1431 (2002), 1481 (2003), 1503 (2003), 1534 (2004) and 1597 (2005), the Council forwarded a list of nominees for temporary judges at the International Criminal Tribunal for the former Yugoslavia (ICTY) to the General Assembly for consideration.

The list of 34 nominees received by the Secretary-General Kofi Annan, which was short of the minimum required by the Statute of the ICTY, was as follows:

- Tanvir Bashir Ansari (Pakistan)
- Melville Baird (Trinidad and Tobago)
- Frans Bauduin (The Netherlands)
- Giancarlo Roberto Belleli (Italy)
- Ishaq Bello (Nigeria)
- Pedro David (Argentina)
- Ahmad Farawati (Syria)
- Elizabeth Gwaunza (Zimbabwe)
- Burton Hall (The Bahamas)
- Frederik Harhoff (Denmark)
- Frank Höpfel (Austria)
- Tsvetana Kamenova (Bulgaria)
- Muhammad Muzammal Khan (Pakistan)
- Uldis Kinis (Latvia)
- Raimo Lahti (Finland)
- Flavia Lattanzi (Italy)
- Antoine Mindua (Democratic Republic of the Congo)
- Jawdat Naboty (Syria)
- Janet Nosworthy (Jamaica)
- Chioma Egondu Nwosu-Iheme (Nigeria)
- Prisca Matimba Nyambe (Zambia)
- Michèle Picard (France)
- Brynmor Pollard (Guyana)
- Árpád Prandler (Hungary)
- Kimberly Prost (Canada)
- Sheikh Abdul Rashid (Pakistan)
- Vonimbolana Rasoazanany (Madagascar)
- Ole Bjørn Støle (Norway)
- Krister Thelin (Sweden)
- Klaus Tolksdorf (Germany)
- Stefan Trechsel (Switzerland)
- Abubakar Bashir Wali (Nigeria)
- Tan Sri Dato Lamin Haji Mohd Yunus (Malaysia)

== See also ==
- List of United Nations Security Council Resolutions 1601 to 1700 (2005–2006)
- Yugoslav Wars
- List of United Nations Security Council Resolutions related to the conflicts in former Yugoslavia
