= United Nations Security Council Resolution 1567 =

UN Security Council Resolution 1567
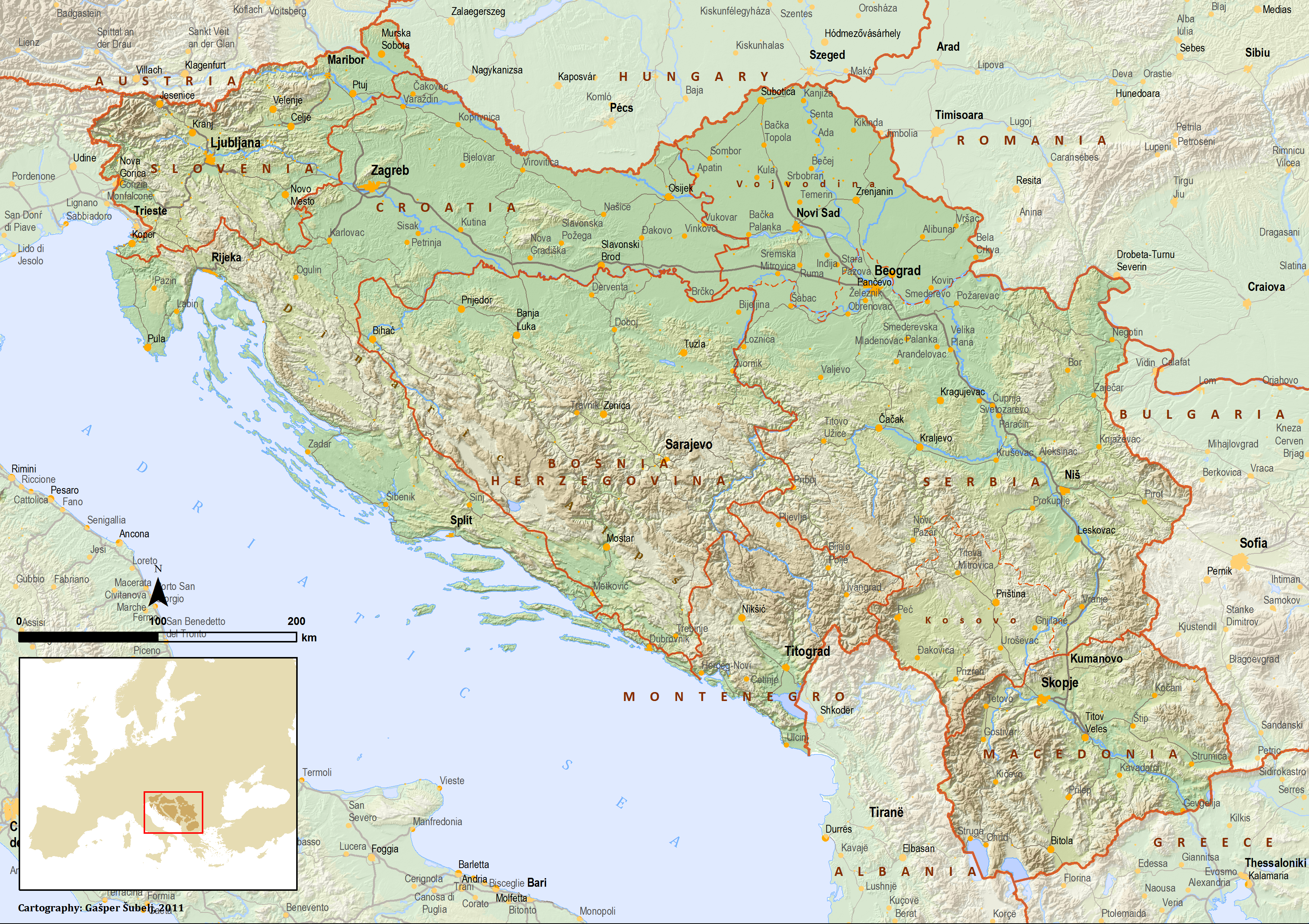
- Territory of the former Yugoslavia
- Date: 14 October 2004
- Meeting no.: 5,057
- Code: S/RES/1567 (Document)
- Subject: The International Criminal Tribunal for the former Yugoslavia
- Voting summary: 15 voted for; None voted against; None abstained
- Result: Adopted

Security Council composition
- Permanent members: China; France; Russia; United Kingdom; United States
- Non-permanent members: Algeria; Angola; Benin; Brazil; Chile; Germany; Pakistan; Philippines; Romania; Spain

United Nations Security Council resolution 1567, adopted unanimously on 14 October 2004, after recalling resolutions 827 (1993), 1166 (1998), 1329 (2000), 1411 (2002), 1481 (2003), 1503 (2003) and 1534 (2004), the Council forwarded a list of nominees for permanent judges at the International Criminal Tribunal for the former Yugoslavia (ICTY) to the General Assembly for consideration.

The list of 22 nominees received by the Secretary-General Kofi Annan was as follows:

- Carmel A. Agius (Malta)
- Jean-Claude Antonetti (France)
- Iain Bonomy (United Kingdom)
- Liu Daqun (China)
- Mohamed Amin El-Abbassi El Mahdi (Egypt)
- Elhagi Abdulkader Emberesh (Libya)
- Rigoberto Espinal Irias (Honduras)
- O-Gon Kwon (South Korea)
- Theodor Meron (United States)
- Bakone Melema Moloto (South Africa)
- Prisca Matimba Nyambe (Zambia)
- Alphonsus Martinus Maria Orie (Netherlands)
- Kevin Horace Parker (Australia)
- Fausto Pocar (Italy)
- Yenyi Olungu (Democratic Republic of the Congo)
- Sharada Prasad Pandit (Nepal)
- Vonimbolana Rasoazanany (Madagascar)
- Patrick Lipton Robinson (Jamaica)
- Wolfgang Schomburg (Germany)
- Mohamed Shahabuddeen (Guyana)
- Christine Van den Wyngaert (Belgium)
- Volodymyr A. Vassylenko (Ukraine)

== See also ==
- List of United Nations Security Council Resolutions 1501 to 1600 (2003–2005)
- Yugoslav Wars
- List of United Nations Security Council Resolutions related to the conflicts in former Yugoslavia
