= United Nations Security Council Resolution 1022 =

UN Security Council Resolution 1022
- Former Yugoslavia: 1: Bosnia and Herzegovina, 2: Croatia, 5+4: Serbia and Montenegro.
- Date: 22 November 1995
- Meeting no.: 3,595
- Code: S/RES/1022 (Document)
- Subject: Former Yugoslavia
- Voting summary: 14 voted for; None voted against; 1 abstained
- Result: Adopted

Security Council composition
- Permanent members: China; France; Russia; United Kingdom; United States
- Non-permanent members: Argentina; Botswana; Czech Republic; Germany; Honduras; Indonesia; Italy; Nigeria; Oman; Rwanda

United Nations Security Council resolution 1022, adopted on 22 November 1995, after recalling all resolutions on the conflicts in the former Yugoslavia, the Council suspended measures in previous resolutions related to the former Yugoslavia.

Bosnia and Herzegovina, Croatia, and Serbia and Montenegro were praised for their participation in peace talks in the United States and the initialling of the General Framework Agreement. The parties had also agreed to help with the search for two French pilots who had gone missing in Bosnia and Herzegovina and to ensure their safe return. The importance of co-operation with the International Conference on the Former Yugoslavia was stressed.

Acting under Chapter VII of the United Nations Charter, measures imposed in resolutions 757 (1992), 787 (1992), 820 (1993), 942 (1994), 943 (1994), 988 (1995), 992 (1995), 1003 (1995) and 1015 (1995) were suspended with immediate effect. The suspension would not apply to the Bosnian Serb Army until they had withdrawn behind the lines of separation. Additionally, the council would end the suspension of measures against Serbia and Montenegro and Bosnian Serb authorities after consultations with the High Representative among others on the fifth working day after they note any party was non-compliant. Ten days after the first free and fair election, all measures would be terminated. During the suspension, frozen funds would also be released.

Resolution 1022 was adopted by 14 votes to none and one abstention from Russia.

== See also ==
- Bosnian War
- Breakup of Yugoslavia
- Croatian War of Independence
- List of United Nations Security Council Resolutions 1001 to 1100 (1995–1997)
- Yugoslav Wars
- Agreement on Succession Issues of the Former Socialist Federal Republic of Yugoslavia
- List of United Nations Security Council Resolutions related to the conflicts in former Yugoslavia
