= United Nations Security Council Resolution 1597 =

UN Security Council Resolution 1597
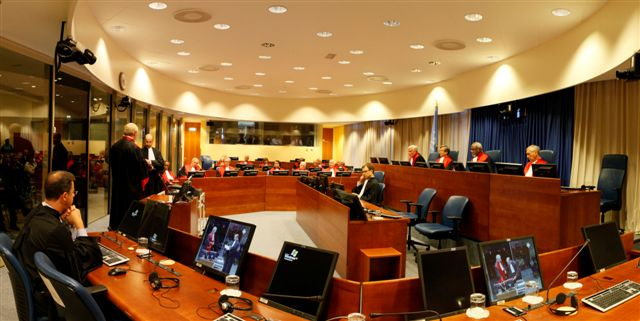
- Swearing in judges at the ICTY; Photograph provided courtesy of the ICTY
- Date: 20 April 2005
- Meeting no.: 5,165
- Code: S/RES/1581 (Document)
- Subject: The International Criminal Tribunal for the former Yugoslavia
- Voting summary: 15 voted for; None voted against; None abstained
- Result: Adopted

Security Council composition
- Permanent members: China; France; Russia; United Kingdom; United States
- Non-permanent members: Algeria; Argentina; Benin; Brazil; Denmark; Greece; Japan; Philippines; Romania; Tanzania

United Nations Security Council resolution 1597, adopted unanimously on 20 April 2005, after recalling resolutions 827 (1993), 1166 (1998), 1329 (2003), 1411 (2002), 1431 (2002), 1481 (2003), 1503 (2003) and 1534 (2004), the Council amended the statute of the International Criminal Tribunal for the former Yugoslavia (ICTY) in order to allow temporary judges to be re-elected.

The Security Council had received a new list of candidates for temporary judges at the ICTY, and the deadline for nominations had been extended until 31 March 2005, with the Secretary-General requesting a further extension. 27 judges elected by the General Assembly whose terms were to expire on 11 June 2005 were able to be re-elected and, acting under Chapter VII of the United Nations Charter, the statute was amended accordingly.

== See also ==
- List of United Nations Security Council Resolutions 1501 to 1600 (2003–2005)
- Yugoslav Wars
- List of United Nations Security Council Resolutions related to the conflicts in former Yugoslavia
