= United Nations Security Council Resolution 1340 =

UN Security Council Resolution 1340
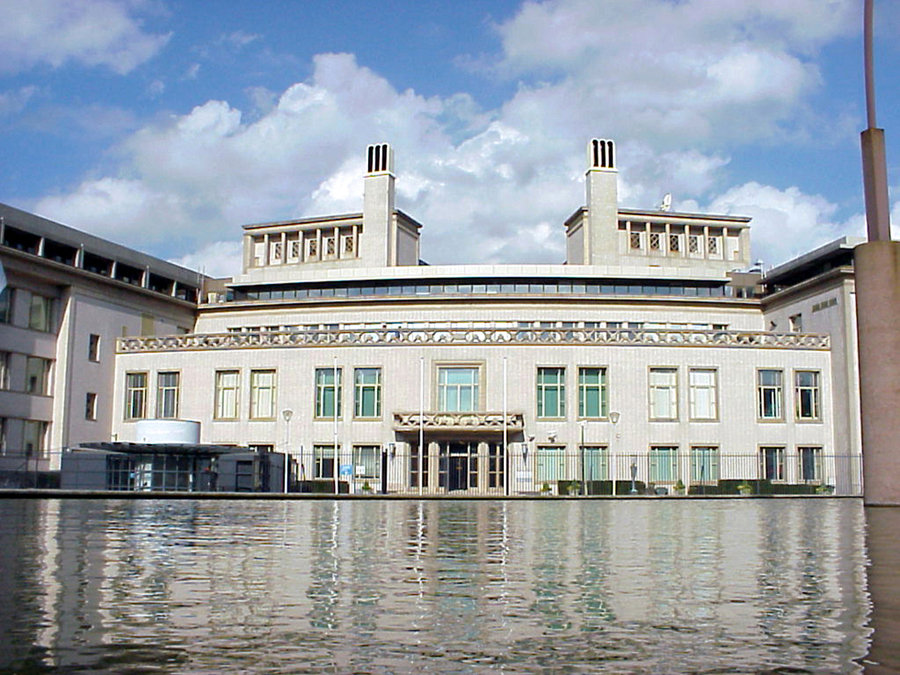
- Front of the ICTY. Photograph provided courtesy of the ICTY.
- Date: 8 February 2001
- Meeting no.: 4,274
- Code: S/RES/1340 (Document)
- Subject: The International Criminal Tribunal for the former Yugoslavia
- Voting summary: 15 voted for; None voted against; None abstained
- Result: Adopted

Security Council composition
- Permanent members: China; France; Russia; United Kingdom; United States
- Non-permanent members: Bangladesh; Colombia; Ireland; Jamaica; Mali; Mauritius; Norway; Singapore; Tunisia; Ukraine

United Nations Security Council resolution 1340, adopted unanimously on 8 February 2001, after recalling resolutions 808 (1993), 827 (1993), 1166 (1998) and 1329 (2000), the Council forwarded a list of nominees for permanent judges at the International Criminal Tribunal for the former Yugoslavia (ICTY) to the General Assembly for consideration.

The list of nominees proposed by the Secretary-General Kofi Annan was as follows:

- Carmel A. Agius (Malta)
- Richard Banda (Malawi)
- Mohamed Amin El Abbassi Elmahdi (Egypt)
- David Hunt (Australia)
- Claude Jorda (France)
- O-Gon Kwon (South Korea)
- Liu Daqun (China)
- Abderraouf Mahbouli (Tunisia)
- Richard May (United Kingdom)
- Theodor Meron (United States)
- Florence Ndepele Mwachande Mumba (Zambia)
- Rafael Nieto Navia (Colombia)
- Leopold Ntahompagaze (Burundi)
- Alphonsus Martinus Maria Orie (Netherlands)
- Fausto Pocar (Italy)
- Jonah Rahetlah (Madagascar)
- Patrick Lipton Robinson (Jamaica)
- Almiro Simões Rodrigues (Portugal)
- Miriam Defensor Santiago (Philippines)
- Wolfgang Schomburg (Germany)
- Mohamed Shahabuddeen (Guyana)
- Demetrakis Stylianides (Cyprus)
- Krister Thelin (Sweden)
- Volodymyr Vassylenko (Ukraine)
- Karam Chand Vohrah (Malaysia)

== See also ==
- List of United Nations Security Council Resolutions 1301 to 1400 (2000–2002)
- Yugoslav Wars
- List of United Nations Security Council Resolutions related to the conflicts in former Yugoslavia
