= United Nations Security Council Resolution 1047 =

UN Security Council Resolution 1047
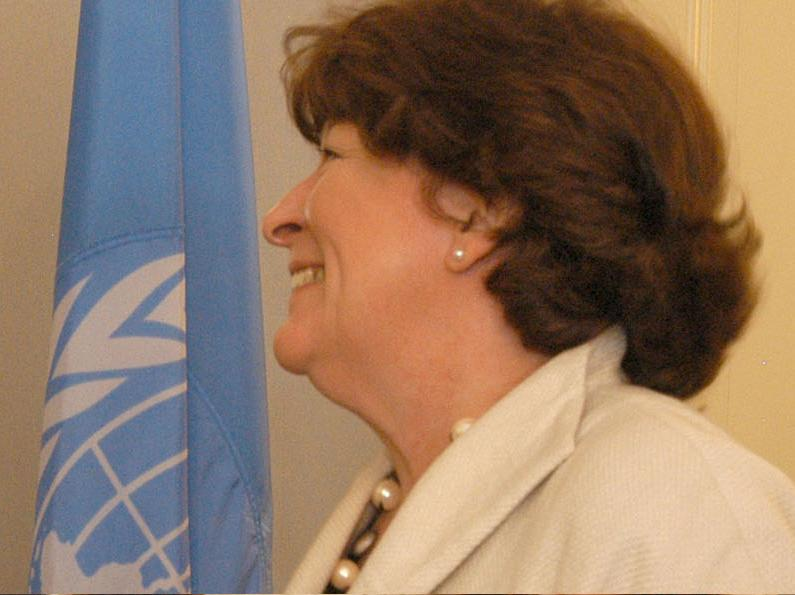
- Louise Arbour
- Date: 29 February 1996
- Meeting no.: 3,637
- Code: S/RES/1047 (Document)
- Subject: Appointment of Prosecutor at the ICTY and ICTR
- Voting summary: 15 voted for; None voted against; None abstained
- Result: Adopted

Security Council composition
- Permanent members: China; France; Russia; United Kingdom; United States
- Non-permanent members: Botswana; Chile; Egypt; Guinea-Bissau; Germany; Honduras; Indonesia; Italy; South Korea; Poland

United Nations Security Council resolution 1047, adopted unanimously on 29 February 1996, after recalling resolutions 808 (1993), 827 (1993), 936 (1994) and 955 (1994), the Council appointed Louise Arbour as Prosecutor at the International Criminal Tribunal for Rwanda (ICTR) and the International Criminal Tribunal for the former Yugoslavia (ICTY).

The Council noted the resignation of the former Prosecutor, Richard Goldstone, with effect from 1 October 1996, and decided that term of Louise Arbour, a Canadian judge, would begin on that date.

== See also ==
- Bosnian Genocide
- Rwandan genocide
- List of United Nations Security Council Resolutions 1001 to 1100 (1995–1997)
- Yugoslav Wars
- List of United Nations Security Council Resolutions related to the conflicts in former Yugoslavia
