= United Nations Security Council Resolution 1191 =

UN Security Council Resolution 1191
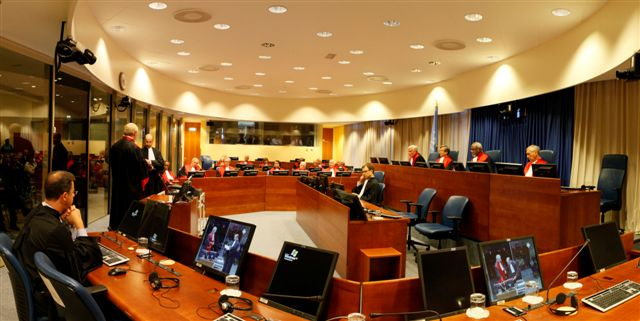
- Courtroom at the ICTY (photograph provided courtesy of the ICTY)
- Date: 27 August 1998
- Meeting no.: 3,919
- Code: S/RES/1191 (Document)
- Subject: The International Tribunal for the former Yugoslavia (ICTY)
- Voting summary: 15 voted for; None voted against; None abstained
- Result: Adopted

Security Council composition
- Permanent members: China; France; Russia; United Kingdom; United States
- Non-permanent members: Bahrain; Brazil; Costa Rica; Gabon; Gambia; Japan; Kenya; Portugal; Slovenia; Sweden

United Nations Security Council resolution 1191 was adopted unanimously on 27 August 1998. In it, after recalling resolutions 808 (1993), 827 (1993) and 1166 (1998), the Council forwarded a list of nine nominations for judges at the International Criminal Tribunal for the former Yugoslavia (ICTY) to the General Assembly for consideration.

The list of nominations received by Secretary-General Kofi Annan by 4 August 1998 was as follows:

- Mohamed Bennouna (Morocco)
- David Hunt (Australia)
- Per-Johan Lindholm (Finland)
- Hugo Anibal Llanos Mansilla (Chile)
- Patrick Robinson (Jamaica)
- S.W.B. Vadugodapitiya (Sri Lanka)
- Luis Valencia Rodríguez (Ecuador)
- Jan Skupinski (Poland)
- Peter Wilkitzki (Germany)

The General Assembly later elected Mohamed Bennouna, David Hunt and Patrick Robinson to serve in the third chamber at the ICTY in October 1998.

== See also ==
- List of United Nations Security Council Resolutions 1101 to 1200 (1997–1998)
- Yugoslav Wars
- List of United Nations Security Council Resolutions related to the conflicts in former Yugoslavia
