= United Nations Security Council Resolution 1534 =

UN Security Council Resolution 1534
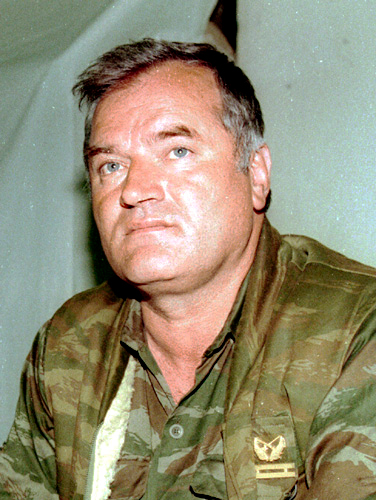
- Ratko Mladić who was indicted by the ICTY
- Date: 26 March 2004
- Meeting no.: 4,935
- Code: S/RES/1534 (Document)
- Subject: The International Criminal Tribunal for the former Yugoslavia and International Criminal Tribunal for Rwanda
- Voting summary: 15 voted for; None voted against; None abstained
- Result: Adopted

Security Council composition
- Permanent members: China; France; Russia; United Kingdom; United States
- Non-permanent members: Algeria; Angola; Benin; Brazil; Chile; Germany; Pakistan; Philippines; Romania; Spain

United Nations Security Council resolution 1534, adopted unanimously on 26 March 2004, after recalling resolutions 827 (1993), 955 (1994), 978 (1995), 1165 (1998), 1166 (1998), 1329 (2000), 1411 (2002), 1431 (2002) and 1481 (2003), the Council called on the International Criminal Tribunal for the former Yugoslavia (ICTY) and the International Criminal Tribunal for Rwanda (ICTR) to complete all trial activities by the end of 2008.

== Resolution ==
=== Observations ===
The Security Council commended the progress both tribunals had made in contributing to peace and security in the former Yugoslavia and Rwanda. It envisaged, in accordance with Resolution 1503 (2004), the completion of ICTY and ICTR investigations by 2004, trials by the end of 2008 and all work in 2010. There was concern that the completion strategies for both tribunals could not be implemented.

=== Acts ===
Acting under Chapter VII of the United Nations Charter, the Council called on all states, particularly Bosnia and Herzegovina, Croatia, Serbia and Montenegro and the Republic Srpska within Bosnia and Herzegovina to co-operate with the ICTY with regard to Radovan Karadžić, Ratko Mladić and Ante Gotovina. Meanwhile, the Democratic Republic of the Congo, Kenya, Rwanda and the Republic of the Congo, among other states, were requested to co-operate with the ICTR with regard to Félicien Kabuga and the Rwandan Patriotic Army. The council, emphasising the importance of implementing the completion strategies, asked the prosecutors to review their caseloads and determine which cases to proceed with and those to defer to national jurisdictions, while prioritising the trials of senior leaders. Both tribunals were asked to report every six months on progress towards implementing the completion strategies.

The resolution praised countries that had concluded agreements for enforcing the sentences of persons convicted by the ICTR and ICTY and encouraged others to do so. It noted that strengthening national judicial systems was crucial to the implementation of the completion strategies. Finally, the Council welcomed efforts to establish a war crimes chamber in Sarajevo, Bosnia and Herzegovina and to ensure the success of domestic prosecutions in the country.

== See also ==
- Bosnian Genocide
- List of United Nations Security Council Resolutions 1501 to 1600 (2003–2005)
- Rwandan genocide
- Yugoslav Wars
- List of United Nations Security Council Resolutions related to the conflicts in former Yugoslavia
