= United Nations Security Council Resolution 1119 =

UN Security Council Resolution 1119
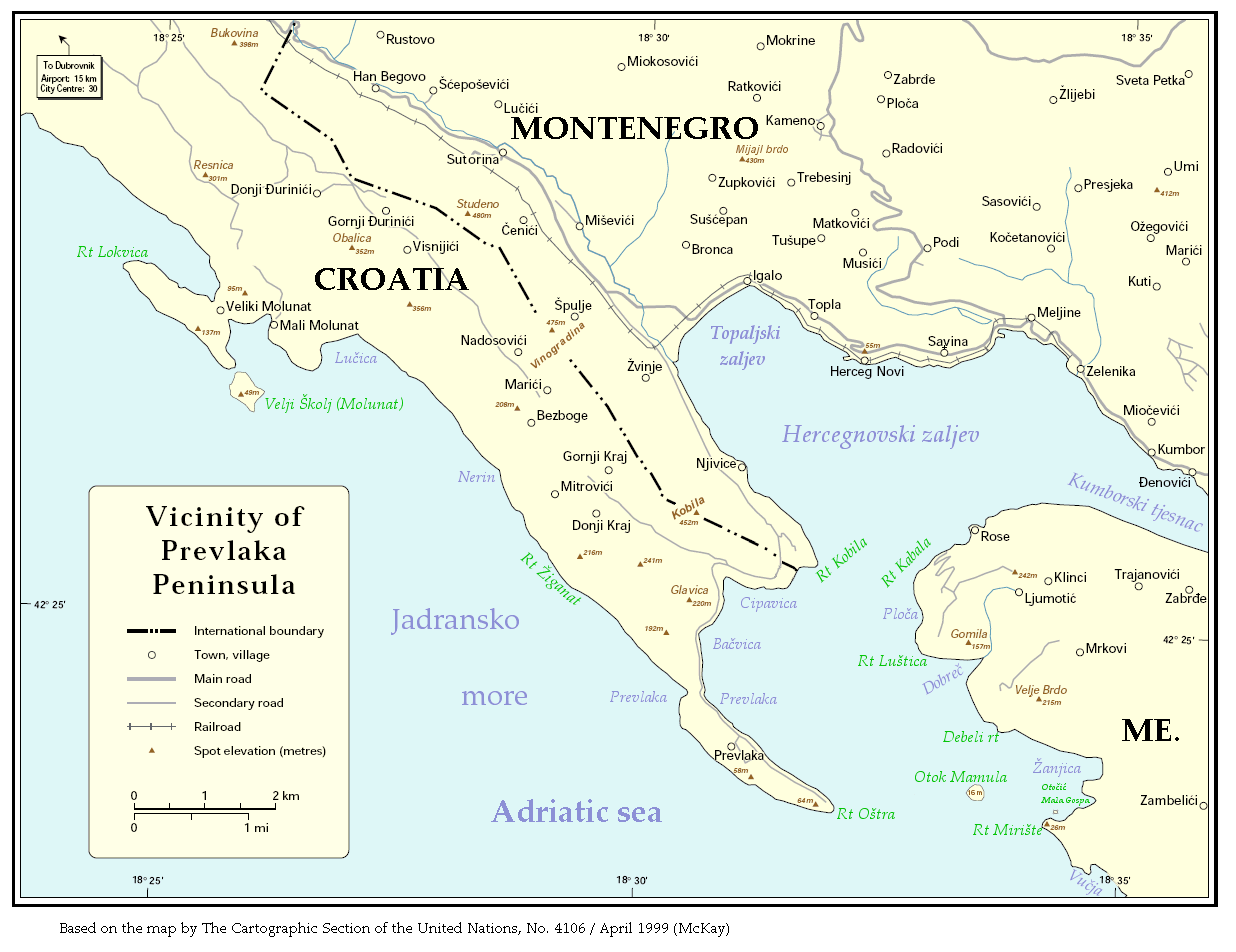
- Prevlaka peninsula
- Date: 14 July 1997
- Meeting no.: 3,800
- Code: S/RES/1119 (Document)
- Subject: The situation in Croatia
- Voting summary: 15 voted for; None voted against; None abstained
- Result: Adopted

Security Council composition
- Permanent members: China; France; Russia; United Kingdom; United States
- Non-permanent members: Chile; Costa Rica; Egypt; Guinea-Bissau; Japan; Kenya; South Korea; Poland; Portugal; Sweden

United Nations Security Council resolution 1119, adopted unanimously on 14 July 1997, after recalling previous resolutions on Croatia including resolutions 779 (1992), 981 (1995), 1025 (1995), 1038 (1996), 1066 (1996) and 1093 (1997), the Council authorised the United Nations Mission of Observers in Prevlaka (UNMOP) to continue monitoring the demilitarisation in the Prevlaka peninsula area of Croatia until 15 January 1998.

The council was concerned that Croatia and the Federal Republic of Yugoslavia (Serbia and Montenegro) had failed to make progress in adopting practical suggestions proposed by the United Nations military observers in May 1996 in order to reduce tension and improve safety and security in the area in addition to resolving the Prevlaka dispute.

The parties were urged to fully implement an agreement on the normalisation of their relations, to refrain from violence, ensure freedom of movement to United Nations observers and remove land mines. The Secretary-General Kofi Annan was requested to report to the council on the situation by 5 January 1998 concerning progress towards a peaceful solution of the dispute between the two countries. Finally, the Stabilisation Force, authorised in Resolution 1088 (1996), were required to co-operate with UNMOP.

== See also ==
- Breakup of Yugoslavia
- Croatian War of Independence
- List of United Nations Security Council Resolutions 1101 to 1200 (1997–1998)
- Yugoslav Wars
- List of United Nations Security Council Resolutions related to the conflicts in former Yugoslavia
