= United Nations Security Council Resolution 857 =

UN Security Council Resolution 857
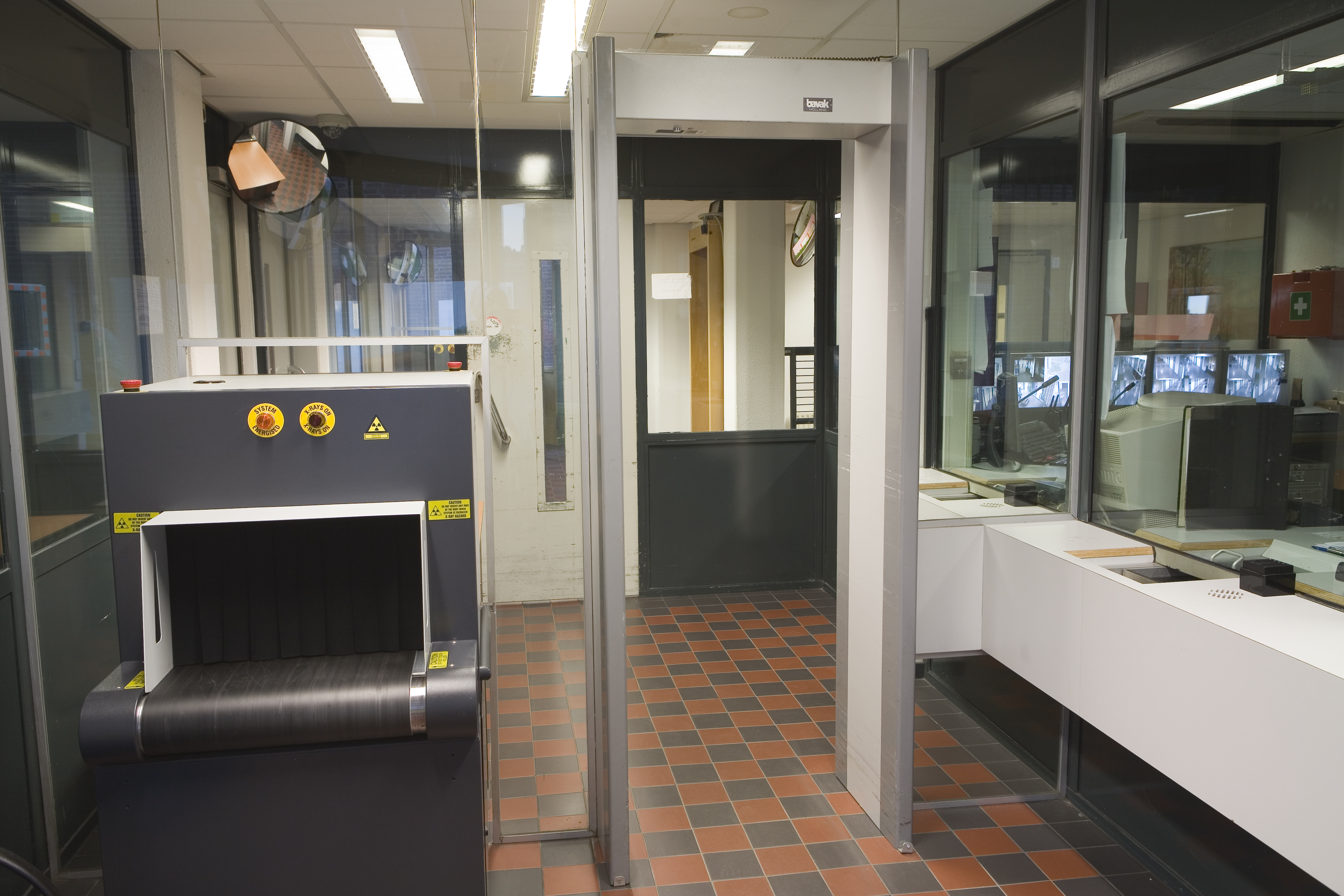
- Security control area at the entrance of the United Nations Detention Unit, the prison of the International Criminal Tribunal for the former Yugoslavia
- Date: 20 August 1993
- Meeting no.: 3,265
- Code: S/RES/857 (Document)
- Subject: Tribunal (Former Yugoslavia)
- Voting summary: 15 voted for; None voted against; None abstained
- Result: Adopted

Security Council composition
- Permanent members: China; France; Russia; United Kingdom; United States
- Non-permanent members: Brazil; Cape Verde; Djibouti; Hungary; Japan; Morocco; New Zealand; Pakistan; Spain; Venezuela

United Nations Security Council resolution 857, adopted unanimously on 20 August 1993, after recalling 808 (1993) and 827 (1993) and considering the nominations for Judges of the International Criminal Tribunal for the former Yugoslavia received by the Secretary-General Boutros Boutros-Ghali before 16 August 1993, the council established a list of candidates in accordance with Article 13 of the Statute of the International Tribunal.

The list of nominations was as follows:

- Georges Michel Abi-Saab (Egypt)
- Julio A. Barberis (Argentina)
- Raphael Barras (Switzerland)
- Sikhe Camara (Guinea)
- Antonio Cassese (Italy)
- Hans Axel Valdemar Corell (Sweden)
- Jules Deschênes (Canada)
- Alfonso De Los Heros (Peru)
- Jerzy Jasinski (Poland)
- Heike Jung (Germany)
- Adolphus Godwin Karibi-Whyte (Nigeria)
- Valentin G. Kisilev (Russian Federation)
- Germain Le Foyer De Costil (France)
- Li Haopei (China)
- Gabrielle Kirk McDonald (United States)
- Amadou N'Diaye (Mali)
- Daniel Nsereko (Uganda)
- Elizabeth Odio Benito (Costa Rica)
- Huseyin Pazarci (Turkey)
- Moragodage Christopher Walter Pinto (Sri Lanka)
- Rustam S. Sidhwa (Pakistan)
- Ninian Stephen (Australia)
- Lal Chan Vohrah (Malaysia)

== See also ==
- Bosnian War
- Breakup of Yugoslavia
- Croatian War of Independence
- List of United Nations Security Council Resolutions 801 to 900 (1993–1994)
- Yugoslav Wars
- List of United Nations Security Council Resolutions related to the conflicts in former Yugoslavia
