= United Nations Security Council Resolution 1015 =

UN Security Council Resolution 1015
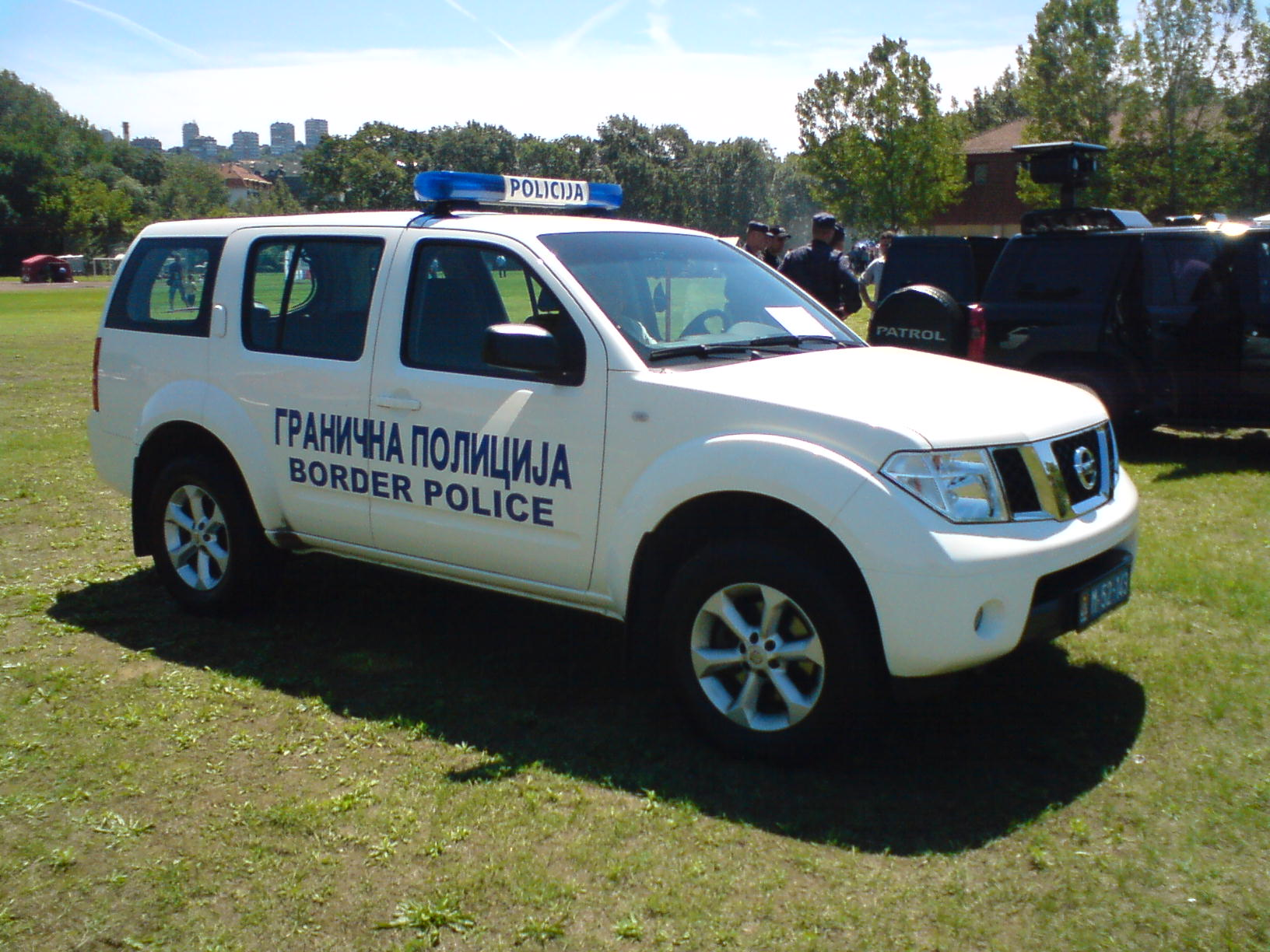
- Serbian border police
- Date: 15 September 1995
- Meeting no.: 3,578
- Code: S/RES/1015 (Document)
- Subject: Former Yugoslavia
- Voting summary: 15 voted for; None voted against; None abstained
- Result: Adopted

Security Council composition
- Permanent members: China; France; Russia; United Kingdom; United States
- Non-permanent members: Argentina; Botswana; Czech Republic; Germany; Honduras; Indonesia; Italy; Nigeria; Oman; Rwanda

United Nations Security Council resolution 1015, adopted unanimously on 15 September 1995, after reaffirming all resolutions on the situation in the former Yugoslavia, in particular resolutions 943 (1994), 970 (1995), 988 (1995) and 1003 (1995), the Council noted measures by the Federal Republic of Yugoslavia (Serbia and Montenegro) to continue the border closure with Bosnia and Herzegovina and therefore extended the partial suspension of sanctions against Serbia and Montenegro for an additional 180 days until 18 March 1996.

It was noted that the border remained closed, except to humanitarian relief and the efforts of Serbia and Montenegro in this regard. There was greater co-operation between Serbia and Montenegro and the Mission of the International Conference on the Former Yugoslavia.

Acting under Chapter VII of the United Nations Charter, the international sanctions placed on Serbia and Montenegro were suspended until 18 March 1996. Restrictions and arrangements in resolutions 943 and 988 would continue to apply. The situation would remain constantly under review by the Security Council.

== See also ==
- Bosnian War
- Breakup of Yugoslavia
- Croatian War of Independence
- List of United Nations Security Council Resolutions 1001 to 1100 (1995–1997)
- Yugoslav Wars
- List of United Nations Security Council Resolutions related to the conflicts in former Yugoslavia
