= United Nations Security Council Resolution 1093 =

UN Security Council Resolution 1093
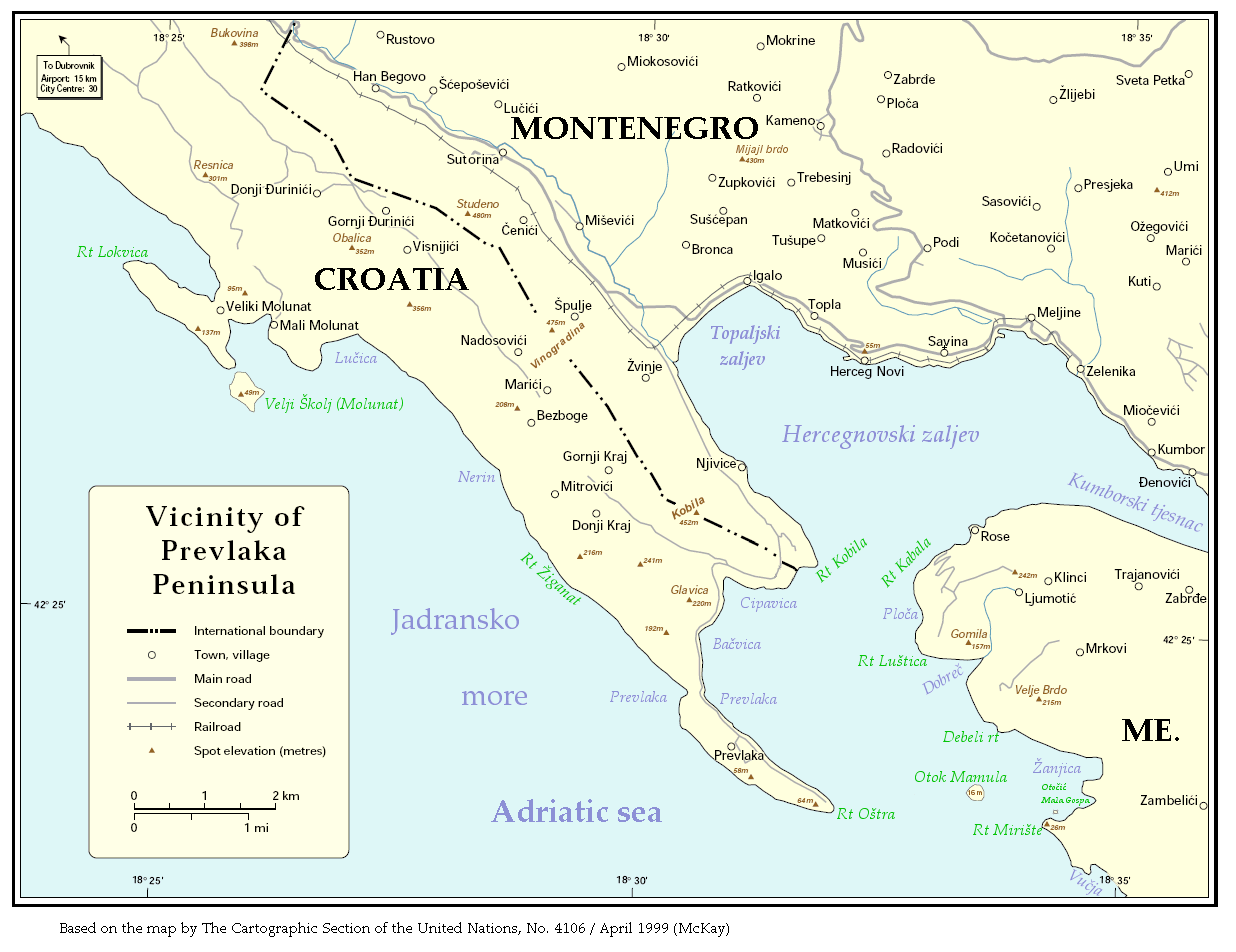
- Prevlaka peninsula
- Date: 14 January 1997
- Meeting no.: 3,731
- Code: S/RES/1093 (Document)
- Subject: The situation in Croatia
- Voting summary: 15 voted for; None voted against; None abstained
- Result: Adopted

Security Council composition
- Permanent members: China; France; Russia; United Kingdom; United States
- Non-permanent members: Chile; Costa Rica; Egypt; Guinea-Bissau; Japan; Kenya; South Korea; Poland; Portugal; Sweden

United Nations Security Council resolution 1093, adopted unanimously on 14 January 1997, after recalling previous resolutions on Croatia including resolutions 779 (1992), 981 (1995), 1025 (1995), 1038 (1996) and 1066 (1996), the Council authorised the United Nations Mission of Observers in Prevlaka (UNMOP) to continue monitoring the demilitarisation in the Prevlaka peninsula area of Croatia until 15 July 1997.

The Council noted the agreement between presidents of Croatia and the Federal Republic of Yugoslavia (Serbia and Montenegro) concerning the demilitarisation of the Prevlaka peninsula and the contribution it had made to reducing tension in the region. There was concern that violations had taken place in the designated United Nations zone, including restrictions on the freedom of movement which increased tension. On 23 August 1996 both parties signed an agreement on the normalisation of diplomatic relations between them and had committed themselves to peacefully resolve the dispute.

The parties were urged to fully implement an agreement on the normalisation of their relations, to refrain from violence, ensure freedom of movement to United Nations observers and remove land mines. The Secretary-General Kofi Annan was requested to report to the council on the situation by 5 July 1997 concerning progress towards a peaceful solution of the dispute between the two countries. Finally, the Stabilisation Force, authorised in Resolution 1088 (1996), were required to co-operate with UNMOP.

== See also ==
- Bosnian War
- Breakup of Yugoslavia
- Croatian War of Independence
- List of United Nations Security Council Resolutions 1001 to 1100 (1995–1997)
- Yugoslav Wars
- List of United Nations Security Council Resolutions related to the conflicts in former Yugoslavia
