= List of United Nations Security Council Resolutions related to the conflicts in former Yugoslavia =

This list contains the resolutions of the UN Security Council connected to the conflicts in former Yugoslavia from 1991–2000. UNSC authorized responses including an arms embargo, economic sanctions, removal of UN recognition, airspace restrictions, and the use of force to maintain a ceasefire.

Resolution number	Country	Result	Year
713	Yugoslavia	For:15/Abs:0/Agn:0	1991
721	Yugoslavia	F:15/Ab:0/Ag:0	1991
724	Yugoslavia	F:15/Ab:0/Ag:0	1991
727	Yugoslavia	F:15/Ab:0/Ag:0	1992
740	Yugoslavia	F:15/Ab:0/Ag:0	1992
743	Yugoslavia	F:15/Ab:0/Ag:0	1992
749	Yugoslavia	F:15/Ab:0/Ag:0	1992
769	former Yugoslavia	F:15/Ab:0/Ag:0	1992
771	former Yugoslavia	F:15/Ab:0/Ag:0	1992
780	former Yugoslavia	F:15/Ab:0/Ag:0	1992
843	former Yugoslavia	F:15/Ab:0/Ag:0	1993
847	former Yugoslavia	F:15/Ab:0/Ag:0	1993
869	former Yugoslavia	F:15/Ab:0/Ag:0	1993
870	former Yugoslavia	F:15/Ab:0/Ag:0	1993
871	former Yugoslavia	F:15/Ab:0/Ag:0	1993
958	former Yugoslavia	F:15/Ab:0/Ag:0	1994
970	former Yugoslavia	F:14/Ab:1/Ag:0	1995
982	former Yugoslavia	F:15/Ab:0/Ag:0	1995
992	former Yugoslavia	F:15/Ab:0/Ag:0	1995
1003	former Yugoslavia	F:14/Ab:1/Ag:0	1995
1015	former Yugoslavia	F:15/Ab:0/Ag:0	1995
1019	former Yugoslavia	F:15/Ab:0/Ag:0	1995
1021	former Yugoslavia	F:14/Ab:1/Ag:0	1995
1022	former Yugoslavia	F:14/Ab:1/Ag:0	1995
1074	former Yugoslavia	F:15/Ab:0/Ag:0	1996

Resolution number	institution	result	year
808	ICTY	F:15/Ab:0/Ag:0	1993
827	ICTY	F:15/Ab:0/Ag:0	1993
857	ICTY	F:15/Ab:0/Ag:0	1993
877	ICTY	F:15/Ab:0/Ag:0	1993
936	ICTY	F:15/Ab:0/Ag:0	1994
1047	ICTY	F:15/Ab:0/Ag:0	1995
1104	ICTY	F:15/Ab:0/Ag:0	1996
1126	ICTY	F:15/Ab:0/Ag:0	1997
1166	ICTY	F:15/Ab:0/Ag:0	1998
1191	ICTY	F:15/Ab:0/Ag:0	1998
1207	ICTY	F:14/Ab:1/Ag:0	1998
1239	ICTY	F:13/Ab:2/Ag:0	1999
1259	ICTY	F:15/Ab:0/Ag:0	1999
1340	ICTY	F:15/Ab:0/Ag:0	2001
1350	ICTY	F:15/Ab:0/Ag:0	2001
1411	ICTY	F:15/Ab:0/Ag:0	2002
1481	ICTY	F:15/Ab:0/Ag:0	2002
1503	ICTY	F:15/Ab:0/Ag:0	2002
1504	ICTY	F:15/Ab:0/Ag:0	2002
1534	ICTY	F:15/Ab:0/Ag:0	2002
1567	ICTY	F:15/Ab:0/Ag:0	2002
1581	ICTY	F:15/Ab:0/Ag:0	2002
1597	ICTY	F:15/Ab:0/Ag:0	2002
1613	ICTY	F:15/Ab:0/Ag:0	2002
1629	ICTY	F:15/Ab:0/Ag:0	2002
1660	ICTY	F:15/Ab:0/Ag:0	2002
1668	ICTY	F:15/Ab:0/Ag:0	2002

Resolution number	country	result	year
760	FR Yugoslavia	F:15/Ab:0/Ag:0	1992
777	FR Yugoslavia	F:12/Ab:3/Ag:0	1992
821	FR Yugoslavia	F:13/Ab:2/Ag:0	1993
967	FR Yugoslavia	F:14/Ab:1/Ag:0	1994
1160	FR Yugoslavia (Kosovo)	F:14/Ab:1/Ag:0	1998
1199	FR Yugoslavia (Kosovo)	F:14/Ab:1/Ag:0	1998
1203	FR Yugoslavia (Kosovo)	F:13/Ab:2/Ag:0	1998
1239	FR Yugoslavia (Kosovo)	F:13/Ab:2/Ag:0	1999
1244	FR Yugoslavia (Kosovo)	F:13/Ab:2/Ag:0	1999

Resolution number	country	result	year
753	Croatia	A	1992
779	Croatia	A	1992
802	Croatia	A	1993
807	Croatia	A	1993
815	Croatia	A	1993
855	Croatia	A	1993
947	Croatia	A	1994
981	Croatia	A	1995
990	Croatia	A	1995
994	Croatia	A	1995
1009	Croatia	A	1995
1023	Croatia	A	1995
1025	Croatia	A	1995
1037	Croatia	A	1996
1038	Croatia	A	1996
1043	Croatia	A	1996
1066	Croatia	A	1996
1069	Croatia	A	1996
1079	Croatia	A	1996
1093	Croatia	A	1997
1119	Croatia	A	1997
1120	Croatia	A	1997
1145	Croatia	A	1997
1147	Croatia	A	1998
1183	Croatia	A	1998
1222	Croatia	A	1999

Resolution number	country	result	year
755	Bosnia and Herzegovina	A	1992
770	Bosnia and Herzegovina	A	1992
819	Bosnia and Herzegovina	A	1993
824	Bosnia and Herzegovina	A	1993
844	Bosnia and Herzegovina	A	1993
1004	Bosnia and Herzegovina	A	1995
1019	Bosnia and Herzegovina	A	1995
1031	Bosnia and Herzegovina	A	1995
1035	Bosnia and Herzegovina	A	1995
1034	Bosnia and Herzegovina	A	1995
1088	Bosnia and Herzegovina	A	1996
1168	Bosnia and Herzegovina	A	1998

Resolution number	country	result	year
817	Republic of Macedonia	A	1993
845	Republic of Macedonia	A	1993
1027	Republic of Macedonia	A	1995
1046	Republic of Macedonia	A	1996
1105	Republic of Macedonia	A	1997
1110	Republic of Macedonia	A	1997
1140	Republic of Macedonia	A	1997
1142	Republic of Macedonia	A	1997
1186	Republic of Macedonia	A	1998

== See also ==
- Yugoslavia and the United Nations
- Arbitration Commission of the Peace Conference on Yugoslavia
- 10th NAM Summit decisions concerning Yugoslav Crisis
