= United Nations Security Council Resolution 1019 =

UN Security Council Resolution 1019
- Date: 9 November 1995
- Meeting no.: 3,591
- Code: S/RES/1019 (Document)
- Subject: Former Yugoslavia
- Voting summary: 15 voted for; None voted against; None abstained
- Result: Adopted

Security Council composition
- Permanent members: China; France; Russia; United Kingdom; United States
- Non-permanent members: Argentina; Botswana; Czech Republic; Germany; Honduras; Indonesia; Italy; Nigeria; Oman; Rwanda

United Nations Security Council resolution 1019, adopted unanimously on 9 November 1995, after recalling resolutions 1004 (1995) and 1010 (1995) on the situation in Bosnia and Herzegovina and 1009 (1995) concerning Croatia, the Council discussed violations of international humanitarian law in the former Yugoslavia.

The Security Council expressed regret that the Bosnian Serbs had not complied with the aforementioned resolutions. There were reports of human rights violations and mass murder, illegal detention, forced labour, rape and deportation at Srebrenica, Banja Luka and Sanski Most. There were further reports, by the United Nations Confidence Restoration Operation and humanitarian agencies, of violations in the sectors West, North and South of Croatia, including the burning of houses, looting and murder. The council also condemned the Bosnian Serbs for not allowing the International Committee of the Red Cross to have access to displaced persons and prisoners.

All violations of international humanitarian law and human rights in the former Yugoslavia were condemned and all parties were required to respect their obligations. The Bosnian Serbs also had to permit access to displaced persons, prisoners and missing persons, respect their rights, their safety and ensure their immediate release. In addition to this, the resolution demanded that all detention camps in Bosnia and Herzegovina be closed.

Meanwhile, the Croatian government had to ensure that violations of humanitarian law and human rights cease and those guilty for any violations were to be punished. The rights of its Serb population had to be respected, including repatriation of refugees, and not to place any time limits on the return of refugees to claim their property.

All countries, particularly in the territory of former Yugoslavia, had to co-operate with the International Criminal Tribunal for the former Yugoslavia established in Resolution 827 (1993) and respond requests from the trial chamber. The parties, especially the Bosnian Serbs, were instructed not to destroy, alter, conceal or damage evidence of violations of international humanitarian law. Finally, the Secretary-General Boutros Boutros-Ghali was requested to keep the Security Council informed on a regular basis on the situation.

== See also ==
- Army of the Republika Srpska
- Bosnian Genocide
- Bosnian War
- Breakup of Yugoslavia
- Croatian War of Independence
- List of United Nations Security Council Resolutions 1001 to 1100 (1995–1997)
- Yugoslav Wars
- List of United Nations Security Council Resolutions related to the conflicts in former Yugoslavia
