= United Nations Security Council Resolution 1207 =

1998 resolution regarding Yugoslavia

UN Security Council Resolution 1207
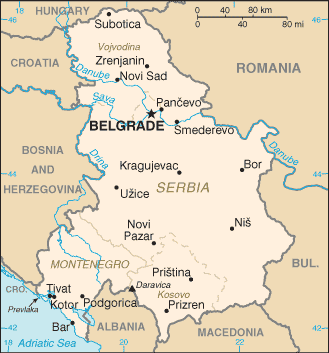
- Serbia and Montenegro
- Date: 17 November 1998
- Meeting no.: 3,944
- Code: S/RES/1207 (Document)
- Subject: The International Criminal Tribunal for the former Yugoslavia
- Voting summary: 14 voted for; None voted against; 1 abstained
- Result: Adopted

Security Council composition
- Permanent members: China; France; Russia; United Kingdom; United States
- Non-permanent members: Bahrain; Brazil; Costa Rica; Gabon; Gambia; Japan; Kenya; Portugal; Slovenia; Sweden

United Nations Security Council resolution 1207, adopted on 17 November 1998, after recalling all resolutions concerning the conflicts in the former Yugoslavia, in particular Resolution 827 (1993), the Council condemned the Federal Republic of Yugoslavia (Serbia and Montenegro) for its failure to execute arrest warrants issued by the International Criminal Tribunal for the former Yugoslavia (ICTY).

The Security Council recalled the General Framework Agreement and deplored the lack of co-operation by the Federal Republic of Yugoslavia with the ICTY.

Acting under Chapter VII of the United Nations Charter, the Council reminded all states of their obligation to co-operate with the Tribunal, including the execution of arrest warrants. It called on countries which had not yet done so, including the Federal Republic of Yugoslavia, to take measures under their domestic law to implement Resolution 827; it could not invoke provisions of domestic law to account for its failure to meet its obligations under international law.

The resolution condemned that arrest warrants had not been issued for three suspects charged with a massacre of 200 Croats and demanded the immediate and unconditional execution of those arrest warrants and a transfer to the Tribunal. The authorities in the Federal Republic of Yugoslavia, Kosovo and other countries were urged to co-operate with the Prosecutor at the ICTY for alleged war crimes. Finally, the President of the Tribunal was urged to keep the Council informed on developments.

Resolution 1207 was adopted by 14 votes to none against, with one abstention from China, which argued that the ICTY was not a permanent court of law and therefore could not interfere in the internal affairs of the Federal Republic of Yugoslavia and other countries.

== See also ==
- Kosovo War
- List of United Nations Security Council Resolutions 1201 to 1300 (1998–2000)
- Yugoslav Wars
- List of United Nations Security Council Resolutions related to the conflicts in former Yugoslavia
