= United Nations Security Council Resolution 936 =

UN Security Council Resolution 936
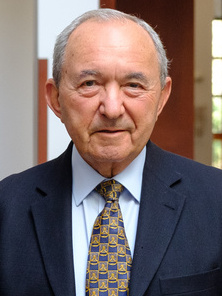
- Richard Goldstone
- Date: 8 July 1994
- Meeting no.: 3,401
- Code: S/RES/936 (Document)
- Subject: Tribunal (Former Yugoslavia)
- Voting summary: 15 voted for; None voted against; None abstained
- Result: Adopted

Security Council composition
- Permanent members: China; France; Russia; United Kingdom; United States
- Non-permanent members: Argentina; Brazil; Czech Republic; Djibouti; New Zealand; Nigeria; Oman; Pakistan; Rwanda; Spain

United Nations Security Council resolution 936, adopted unanimously on 8 July 1994, after reaffirming resolutions 808 (1993) and 827 (1994), the Council appointed Richard Goldstone, a judge at the Constitutional Court of South Africa, as Prosecutor at the International Criminal Tribunal for the former Yugoslavia (ICTY).

== See also ==
- Bosnian War
- Breakup of Yugoslavia
- Croatian War of Independence
- List of United Nations Security Council Resolutions 901 to 1000 (1994–1995)
- Yugoslav Wars
- List of United Nations Security Council Resolutions related to the conflicts in former Yugoslavia
