= United Nations Security Council Resolution 1504 =

UN Security Council Resolution 1504
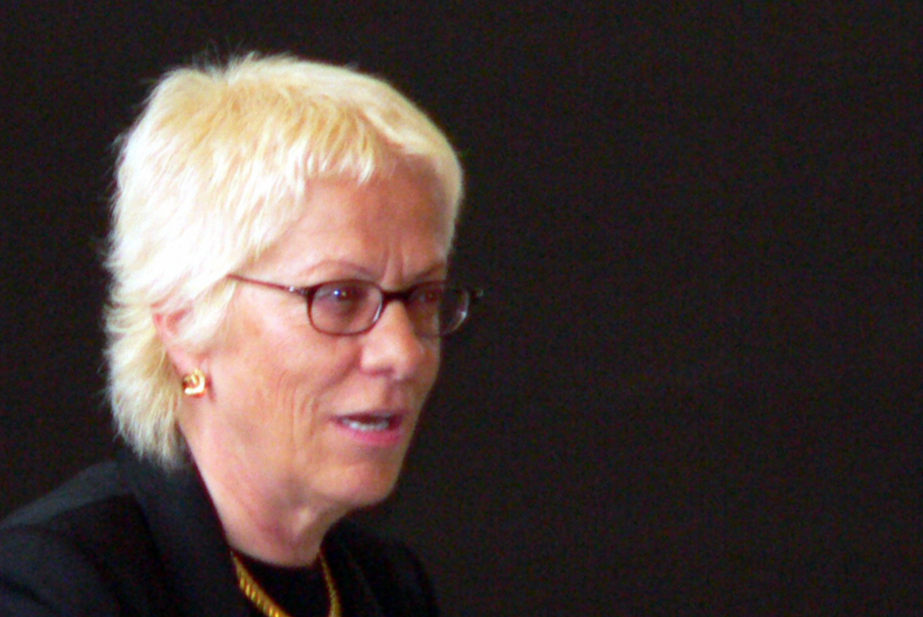
- Carla Del Ponte
- Date: 4 September 2003
- Meeting no.: 4,819
- Code: S/RES/1504 (Document)
- Subject: The International Criminal Tribunal for the former Yugoslavia
- Voting summary: 15 voted for; None voted against; None abstained
- Result: Adopted

Security Council composition
- Permanent members: China; France; Russia; United Kingdom; United States
- Non-permanent members: Angola; Bulgaria; Chile; Cameroon; Germany; Guinea; Mexico; Pakistan; Spain; Syria

United Nations Security Council resolution 1504, adopted unanimously on 4 September 2003, after recalling Resolution 1503 (2003), the Council appointed Carla Del Ponte as Prosecutor at the International Criminal Tribunal for the former Yugoslavia (ICTY).

The Security Council welcomed the Secretary-General Kofi Annan's intention to nominate Carla Del Ponte, and subsequently approved her appointment for a four-year term, beginning on 15 September 2003.

== See also ==
- Bosnian Genocide
- List of United Nations Security Council Resolutions 1501 to 1600 (2003–2005)
- Yugoslav Wars
- List of United Nations Security Council Resolutions related to the conflicts in former Yugoslavia
