= United Nations Security Council Resolution 1009 =

UN Security Council Resolution 1009
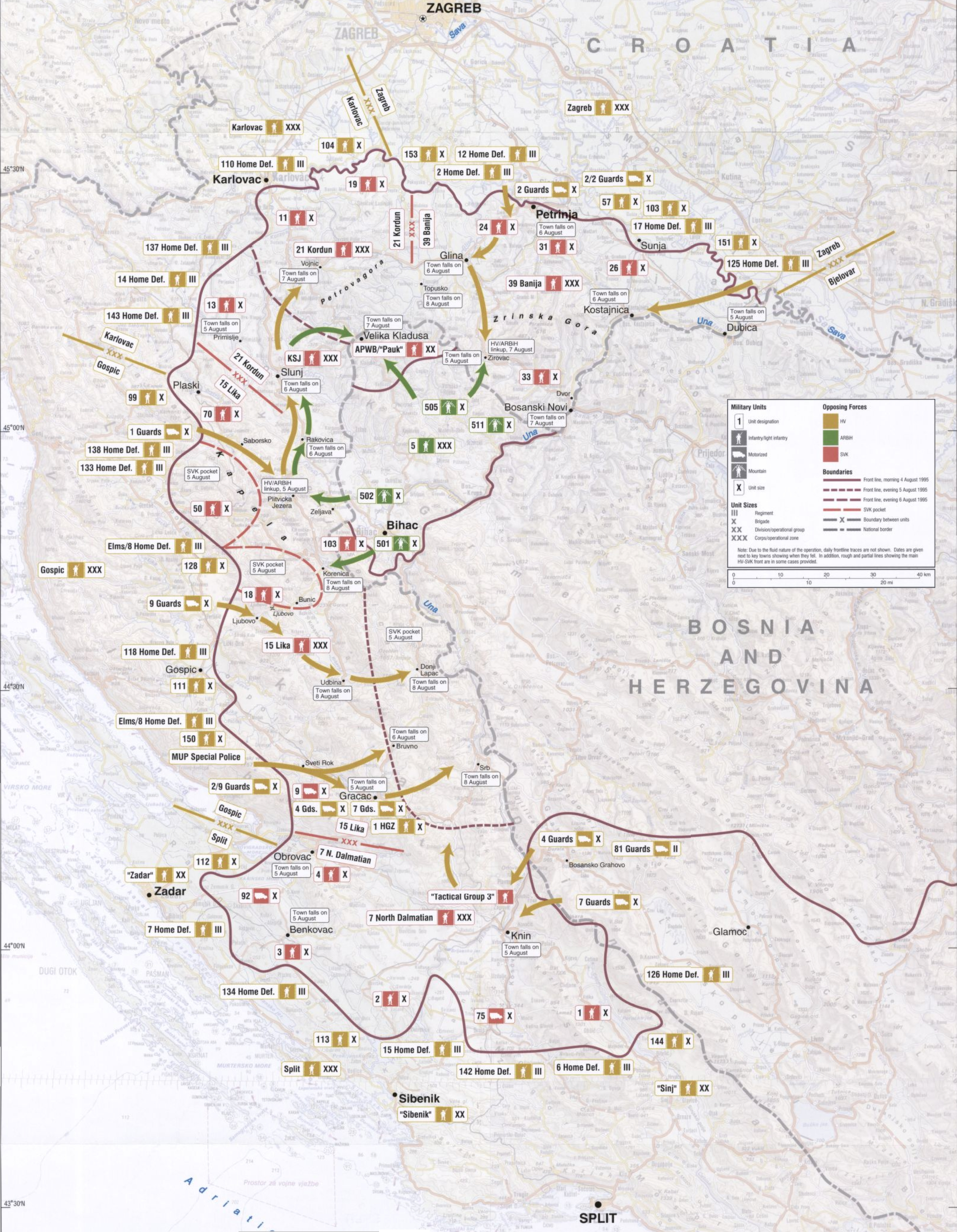
- Operation Storm
- Date: 10 August 1995
- Meeting no.: 3,563
- Code: S/RES/1009 (Document)
- Subject: Croatia
- Voting summary: 15 voted for; None voted against; None abstained
- Result: Adopted

Security Council composition
- Permanent members: China; France; Russia; United Kingdom; United States
- Non-permanent members: Argentina; Botswana; Czech Republic; Germany; Honduras; Indonesia; Italy; Nigeria; Oman; Rwanda

United Nations Security Council resolution 1009, adopted unanimously on 10 August 1995, after recalling all resolutions on the situation in the former Yugoslavia including resolutions 981 (1995), 990 (1995) and 994 (1995), the Council demanded that the Government of Croatia strictly observe Security Council resolutions after an offensive by the Croatian Army began on 4 August 1995.

The Council stated that Croatia had not complied with the requirements of the Security Council which were made earlier in the month. Concern was expressed about the violations of the arms embargo and regretted that talks in Geneva had been broken off. The importance of a negotiated settlement was stressed in conjunction with mutual recognition of states in the former Yugoslavia. The large-scale offensive that Croatia began against ethnic Serbs on 4 August escalated the conflict and was regrettable. The shelling of civilian targets was again condemned, and it was noted that violations of international humanitarian law had been committed and that the people who fled were in a serious situation. The rights of the local Serb population had to be protected, while violence against the United Nations personnel which resulted in three fatalities was also condemned by the council.

Acting under Chapter VII of the United Nations Charter, the Security Council demanded that Croatia and cease all military actions immediately and respect the rights of local Serbs, allow access to the region by the International Committee of the Red Cross and humanitarian organisations, permit the return of refugees and displaced persons and respect the status of United Nations personnel, bringing to justice any person responsible for attacks on UNPROFOR. All parties were reminded of their obligations under Resolution 816 (1993) and to aim for a negotiated settlement which guaranteed the rights of all communities in talks under the auspices of the International Conference on the Former Yugoslavia.

Finally, the Secretary-General Boutros Boutros-Ghali was required to submit a report to the Council within three weeks of the adoption of the present resolution regarding its implementation and the implications of the situation on the United Nations Confidence Restoration Operation. Further measures would also be considered to ensure compliance with Resolution 1009.

== See also ==
- Bosnian War
- Breakup of Yugoslavia
- Croatian War of Independence
- List of United Nations Security Council Resolutions 1001 to 1100 (1995–1997)
- Operation Flash
- Yugoslav Wars
- List of United Nations Security Council Resolutions related to the conflicts in former Yugoslavia
