= United Nations Security Council Resolution 1503 =

UN Security Council Resolution 1503
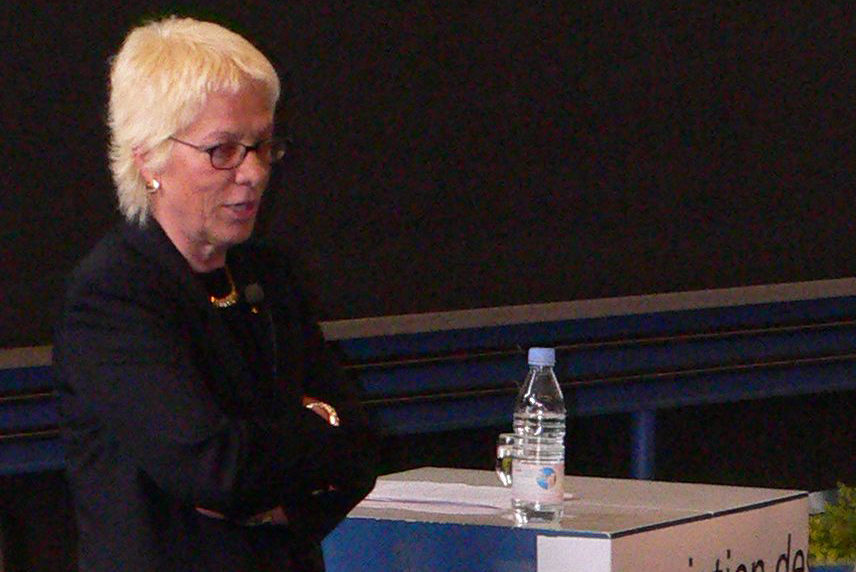
- Carla Del Ponte
- Date: 28 August 2003
- Meeting no.: 4,817
- Code: S/RES/1503 (Document)
- Subject: The International Criminal Tribunal for the former Yugoslavia and International Criminal Tribunal for Rwanda
- Voting summary: 15 voted for; None voted against; None abstained
- Result: Adopted

Security Council composition
- Permanent members: China; France; Russia; United Kingdom; United States
- Non-permanent members: Angola; Bulgaria; Chile; Cameroon; Germany; Guinea; Mexico; Pakistan; Spain; Syria

United Nations Security Council resolution 1503, adopted unanimously on 28 August 2003, after recalling resolutions 827 (1993), 955 (1994), 978 (1995), 1165 (1998), 1166 (1998), 1329 (2000), 1411 (2002), 1431 (2002) and 1481 (2003), the Council decided to split the prosecutorial duties of the International Criminal Tribunal for the former Yugoslavia (ICTY) and the International Criminal Tribunal for Rwanda (ICTR) which had previously been under the responsibility of one official, Carla Del Ponte, since 1999.

== Resolution ==
=== Observations ===
The Security Council commended the progress both tribunals had made in contributing to peace and security in the former Yugoslavia and Rwanda. Welcoming steps taken the concerned states in the Balkans and African Great Lakes region, it noted the objective of both tribunals to apprehend all remaining persons at large and called for the co-operation of countries in this regard. The Council urged states to impose measures against individuals assisting fugitives through travel bans and the freezing of assets.

The preamble of the resolution also envisaged the completion of ICTY and ICTR investigations by 2004, trials by the end of 2008 and all work in 2010 by concentrating on the prosecution of senior leaders. Lower-level officials would be tried at a national level. The strengthening of national judicial systems was crucial to the ICTY and ICTR completion strategies, including the establishment of a war crimes chamber at the ICTY. It was convinced that both tribunals could complete their work more efficiently if each had its own Prosecutor.

=== Acts ===
Acting under Chapter VII of the United Nations Charter, the Council called on the international community to assist national jurisdictions in improving their capacity to prosecute cases transferred from the ICTY and ICTR, encouraging the development of outreach programmes. It called on all states, particularly Bosnia and Herzegovina, Croatia, Serbia and Montenegro and the Republic Srpska within Bosnia and Herzegovina to co-operate with the ICTY with regard to Radovan Karadžić, Ratko Mladić and Ante Gotovina. Meanwhile, the Democratic Republic of the Congo, Kenya, Rwanda and the Republic of the Congo, among other states, were requested to co-operate with the ICTR with regard to Félicien Kabuga and the Rwandan Patriotic Army.

All states were urged to co-operate with Interpol in apprehending fugitives while the donor community was asked to support High Representative for Bosnia and Herzegovina in the creation of a special chamber at the ICTY to deal with serious violations of international humanitarian law. The Presidents and Prosecutors of both tribunals were asked to report on the implementation of the completion strategies.

Finally, the Secretary-General Kofi Annan was instructed to nominate a Prosecutor for the ICTR, while his decision to nominate Carla Del Ponte as Prosecutor at the ICTY was welcomed.

== See also ==
- Bosnian genocide
- List of United Nations Security Council Resolutions 1501 to 1600 (2003–2005)
- Rwandan genocide
- Yugoslav Wars
- List of United Nations Security Council Resolutions related to the conflicts in former Yugoslavia
