= United Nations Security Council Resolution 820 =

UN Security Council Resolution 820
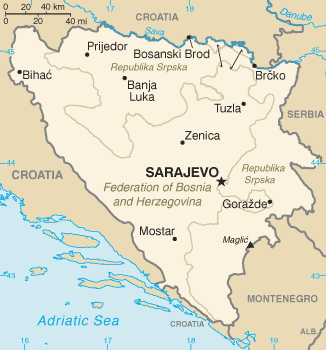
- Bosnia and Herzegovina
- Date: 17 April 1993
- Meeting no.: 3,200
- Code: S/RES/820 (Document)
- Subject: Bosnia and Herzegovina
- Voting summary: 13 voted for; None voted against; 2 abstained
- Result: Adopted

Security Council composition
- Permanent members: China; France; Russia; United Kingdom; United States
- Non-permanent members: Brazil; Cape Verde; Djibouti; Hungary; Japan; Morocco; New Zealand; Pakistan; Spain; Venezuela

United Nations Security Council resolution 820, adopted on 17 April 1993, after reaffirming all previous resolutions on the topic for a lasting peace settlement in Bosnia and Herzegovina and the region, the council discussed the peace plan for Bosnia and Herzegovina and comprehensive steps to ensure its implementation.

== Contents ==
The council reaffirmed that the practice of ethnic cleansing was unacceptable and that all displaced persons should be returned to their homes. It noted Resolution 808 (1993) in which proposals for an international tribunal were confirmed, further expressing its alarm at the condition of the victims of the conflict.

The resolution went on to confirm the peace plan for Bosnia and Herzegovina and its acceptance by two of the Bosnian parties, however concern was expressed over the rejection by the Bosnian Serb party of the Agreement on Interim Arrangements. All sides were requested to observe a ceasefire and engage in no further hostilities, respecting the right of the United Nations Protection Force (UNPROFOR) and international humanitarian agencies to have unimpeded access to the entire country and ensure the safety of their staff. Violations of international humanitarian law were condemned, in particular ethnic cleansing and the detention and rape of women. All statements made under duress were declared null and void and that all persons displaced have the right to return home.

The security council declared its intention to help implement the peace plan and asked the Secretary-General Boutros Boutros-Ghali to report back with detailed proposals including the effective control of heavy weapons within 9 days of the adoption of the current resolution, requesting member states to co-operate with him.

Resolution 820 was adopted by 13 votes to none and two abstentions from China and Russia.

== Sanctions ==
The council, acting under Chapter VII of the United Nations Charter, then decided that the measures listed below were to be implemented within nine days unless the Bosnian Serbs signed the peace plan and ceased their attacks, noting that if they should continue, the measures would take effect immediately. The measures included:

1. the import, export and transhipment through protected areas and areas controlled by the Bosnian Serbs would only be permitted by the governments of Croatia or Bosnia and Herzegovina, excluding humanitarian aid;
2. all States should, in implementing resolutions 757 (1992), 760 (1992), 787 (1992) and the current resolution, take steps to prevent diversion of commodities and products destined for other places, to the Federal Republic of Yugoslavia (Serbia and Montenegro);
3. demands full co-operation with UNPROFOR with immigration and customs control functions derived in 769 (1992);
4. all navigation on the Danube had to be authorised by the committee established in 724 (1991);
5. prevent vessels owned or controlled by the Federal Republic of Yugoslavia, or those in violation of Security Council resolutions, from passing through river installations;
6. countries on the banks of the Danube are responsible for ensuring that shipping is in compliance with previous resolutions;
7. the importance of the measures taken and any violations must be reported and penalties issued if necessary;
8. states holding funds from the Federal Republic of Yugoslavia (Serbia and Montenegro) should freeze them;
9. prohibits the transport of all commodities and products across the land borders or to or from the ports of the Federal Republic of Yugoslavia, excluding medical and food supplies, humanitarian aid and those on approved by the committee;
10. states neighbouring the Federal Republic of Yugoslavia should prevent the passage of all freight vehicles and rolling stock onto or out of the Federal Republic of Yugoslavia except for a limited amount of crossing approved by the committee;
11. all vessels, vehicles and aircraft suspected of violating the resolutions pending investigation were to be held, with costs passed on to the owners;
12. prohibit the provision of services, except for telecommunications, postal services or legal services;
13. all commercial shipping in the territorial waters off Serbia and Montenegro was banned.

The council confirmed that the above measures do not apply to UNPROFOR, the International Conference on the former Yugoslavia and European Community Monitoring Mission. It also announced its attention that the measures would be reconsidered once the Bosnian Serb party co-operates in good faith with the United Nations peace plan.

== See also ==
- Breakup of Yugoslavia
- Bosnian Genocide
- Bosnian War
- Croatian War of Independence
- List of United Nations Security Council Resolutions 801 to 900 (1993–1994)
- Yugoslav Wars
