= United Nations Security Council Resolution 1239 =

UN Security Council Resolution 1239
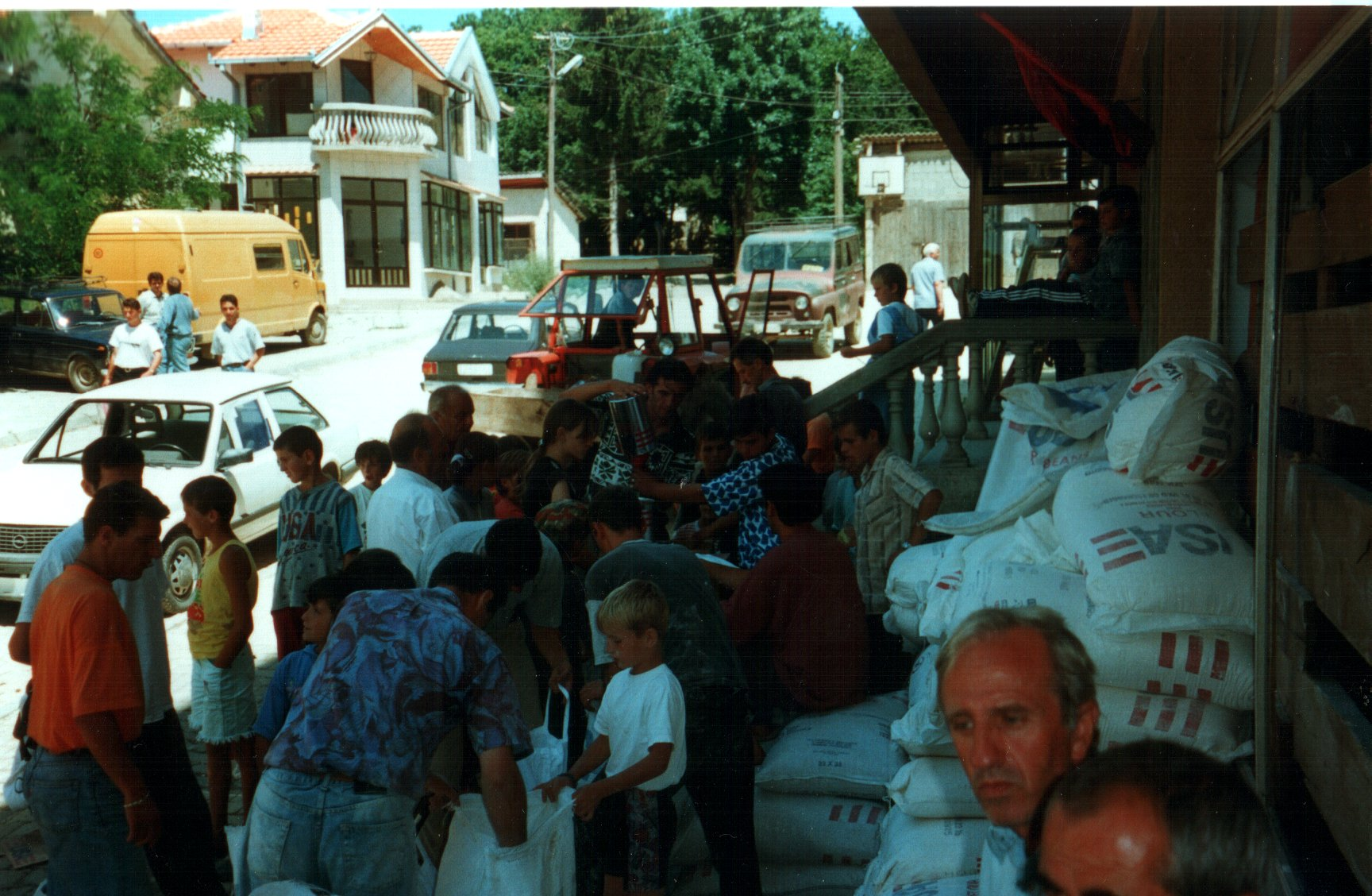
- Aid distribution in Kosovo (1999)
- Date: 14 May 1999
- Meeting no.: 4,003
- Code: S/RES/1239 (Document)
- Subject: The situation in Kosovo
- Voting summary: 13 voted for; None voted against; 2 abstained
- Result: Adopted

Security Council composition
- Permanent members: China; France; Russia; United Kingdom; United States
- Non-permanent members: Argentina; Bahrain; Brazil; Canada; Gabon; Gambia; Malaysia; Namibia; Netherlands; Slovenia

United Nations Security Council resolution 1239, adopted on 14 May 1999, after recalling resolutions 1160 (1998), 1199 (1998) and 1203 (1998), the Council called for access for the United Nations and other humanitarian personnel operating in Kosovo to other parts of the Federal Republic of Yugoslavia (Serbia and Montenegro).

The Security Council recalled the United Nations Charter, Universal Declaration of Human Rights, international agreements and conventions on human rights, the Conventions and Protocol relating to the Status of Refugees, the Geneva Conventions of 1949 and other instruments of international humanitarian law. It expressed concern at the humanitarian catastrophe occurring in and around Kosovo as a result of the continuing crisis. Furthermore, there was concern for the influx of Kosovan refugees into Albania, Macedonia, Bosnia and Herzegovina and other countries. In this regard it noted the intention of the Secretary-General Kofi Annan to send a mission to Kosovo to assess humanitarian needs.

The resolution commended efforts already undertaken by Member States, the United Nations High Commissioner for Refugees (UNHCR) and other humanitarian relief organisations. They were asked to extend assistance to the internally displaced persons in Kosovo, Montenegro and other parts of the Federal Republic of Yugoslavia. The Security Council called for access for United Nations and all humanitarian personnel operating in Kosovo and other parts of the Federal Republic of Yugoslavia, reaffirming the right of refugees to return home safely. It emphasised that, without a political solution, the humanitarian solution would continue to deteriorate consistent with principles adopted by the G8.

Resolution 1239 was adopted by 13 votes to none against and two abstentions from China and Russia, which argued that the NATO bombing of Yugoslavia, without authorisation of the Security Council, had contributed towards the crisis and regretted that this was not mentioned in the resolution.

== See also ==
- Breakup of Yugoslavia
- Kosovo status process
- Kosovo War
- List of United Nations Security Council Resolutions 1201 to 1300 (1998–2000)
- Yugoslav Wars
- List of United Nations Security Council Resolutions related to the conflicts in former Yugoslavia
