= United Nations Security Council Resolution 1003 =

UN Security Council Resolution 1003
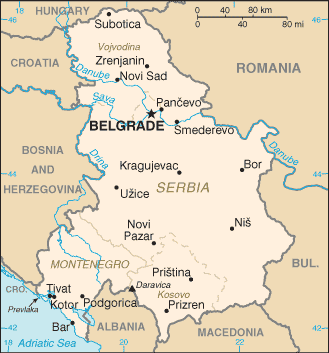
- Serbia and Montenegro
- Date: 5 July 1995
- Meeting no.: 3,551
- Code: S/RES/1003 (Document)
- Subject: Former Yugoslavia
- Voting summary: 14 voted for; None voted against; 1 abstained
- Result: Adopted

Security Council composition
- Permanent members: China; France; Russia; United Kingdom; United States
- Non-permanent members: Argentina; Botswana; Czech Republic; Germany; Honduras; Indonesia; Italy; Nigeria; Oman; Rwanda

United Nations Security Council resolution 1003, adopted on 5 July 1995, after reaffirming all resolutions on the situation in the former Yugoslavia, in particular resolutions 943 (1994), 970 (1995) and 988 (1995), the Council noted measures by the Federal Republic of Yugoslavia (Serbia and Montenegro) to continue the border closure with Bosnia and Herzegovina and therefore extended the partial suspension of sanctions against Serbia and Montenegro for an additional 75 days until 18 September 1995.

It was noted that the border remained closed, except to humanitarian relief and the efforts of Serbia and Montenegro in this regard. The Council underlined the importance it attached to there being no provision of military assistance to Bosnian Serb forces. At the same time, streamlined procedures adopted by the committee established in 724 (1991) were welcomed, concerning legitimate humanitarian assistance requests and transshipment on the Danube River.

Acting under Chapter VII of the United Nations Charter, the international sanctions placed on Serbia and Montenegro were suspended until 18 September 1995. The resolution also called for the mutual recognition between the states of the former Yugoslavia, with recognition between Bosnia and Herzegovina and Serbia and Montenegro being an important first step in the process. The situation would remain constantly under review by the Security Council.

Resolution 1003 was adopted by 14 votes to none against, with one abstention from Russia.

== See also ==
- Bosnian War
- Breakup of Yugoslavia
- Croatian War of Independence
- List of United Nations Security Council Resolutions 1001 to 1100 (1995–1997)
- Yugoslav Wars
- List of United Nations Security Council Resolutions related to the conflicts in former Yugoslavia
