= United Nations Security Council Resolution 787 =

UN Security Council Resolution 787
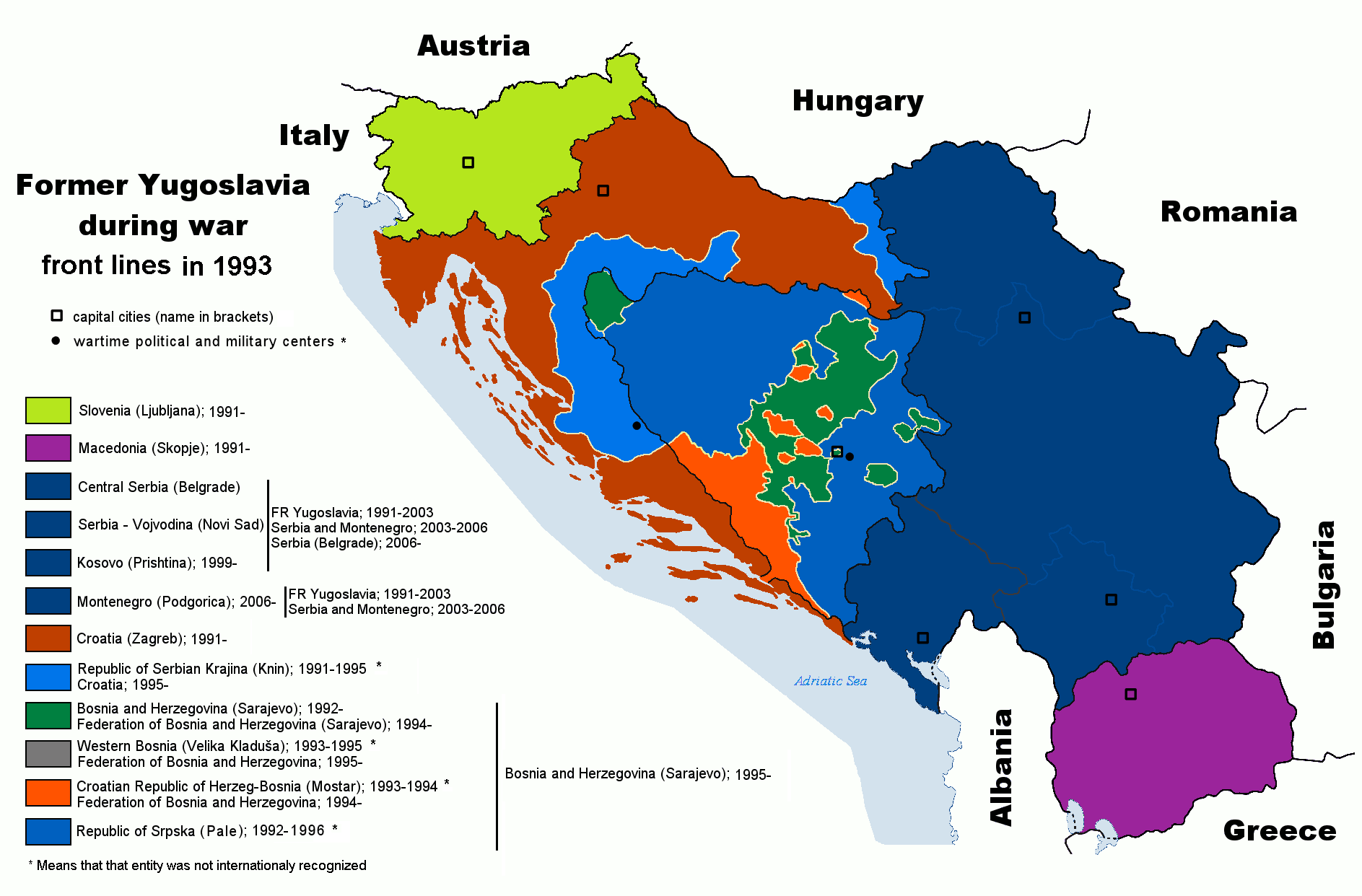
- Map of former Yugoslavia in 1992
- Date: 16 November 1992
- Meeting no.: 3,137
- Code: S/RES/787 (Document)
- Subject: Bosnia and Herzegovina
- Voting summary: 13 voted for; None voted against; 2 abstained
- Result: Adopted

Security Council composition
- Permanent members: China; France; Russia; United Kingdom; United States
- Non-permanent members: Austria; Belgium; Cape Verde; Ecuador; Hungary; India; Japan; Morocco; Venezuela; Zimbabwe

United Nations Security Council resolution 787, adopted on 16 November 1992, after reaffirming Resolution 713 (1991) and all subsequent resolutions on the topic, the council called upon the parties in Bosnia and Herzegovina to consider the draft outline constitution as a basis for negotiating a political settlement of the conflict in the country, and went on to impose further international sanctions on the Federal Republic of Yugoslavia (Serbia and Montenegro).

The council went on to reaffirm that the taking of territory by force, in particular the practice of ethnic cleansing, is unacceptable, calling on all parties to respect the territorial integrity of Bosnia and Herzegovina and affirming that any entities unilaterally declared or arrangements imposed in contravention thereof will not be accepted. It also condemned all parties in Bosnia and Herzegovina, particularly Bosnian Serb paramilitary forces, for their refusal to comply with previous security council resolutions. The council also demanded that all outside interference in Bosnia and Herzegovina cease, including the requirement that all forces, in particular elements of the Croatian Army, be withdrawn, disbanded or disarmed, calling upon all parties to fulfil their commitments to put into effect an immediate cessation of hostilities and to negotiate in the Mixed Military Working Group and end the blockade of Sarajevo and other towns.

The resolution again condemned violations of international law, including that of ethnic cleansing and the impeding of humanitarian aid, welcoming the establishment of the Commission of Experts under Resolution 780 (1992), requesting it to actively investigate violations under the Geneva Conventions. The council then, under Chapter VII of the United Nations Charter, decided to expand the scope of international sanctions against the Federal Republic of Yugoslavia to apply to ships with which it has an interest in or operating from the Federal Republic, calling on states to ensure that exports are not diverted to the country in violation of Resolution 757 (1992). It also asked for measures commensurate under the present circumstances to halt inward and outward maritime shipping in order to inspect and verify their cargoes and destinations and to ensure strict implementation of previous resolutions. In this regard, the council commended riparian states which were acting in compliance with security council resolutions.

Resolution 787 then requested the states concerned to coordinate with the Secretary-General Boutros Boutros-Ghali the facilitation of monitoring of compliance with the current resolution, providing any assistance when required. Concerning the humanitarian situation, the council urged donors and international organisations to contribute to the relief efforts in the former Yugoslavia, calling for full co-operation with the United Nations Protection Force to ensure the safe delivery of humanitarian aid to the affected population. It also invited the Secretary-General to in consultation with the United Nations High Commissioner for Refugees and other agencies, to consider the prospect of promoting "safe zones" for humanitarian purposes. Finally, the resolution appreciated the report by the co-chairmen of the Steering Committee of the International Conference on the Former Yugoslavia and requested to be updated on the situation.

The resolution was adopted by 13 votes to none against, with two abstentions from China and Zimbabwe. The current resolution was strengthened by Resolution 820.

== See also ==
- Breakup of Yugoslavia
- Bosnian Genocide
- Bosnian War
- Croatian War of Independence
- List of United Nations Security Council Resolutions 701 to 800 (1991–1993)
- Yugoslav Wars
