= United Nations Security Council Resolution 1066 =

UN Security Council Resolution 1066
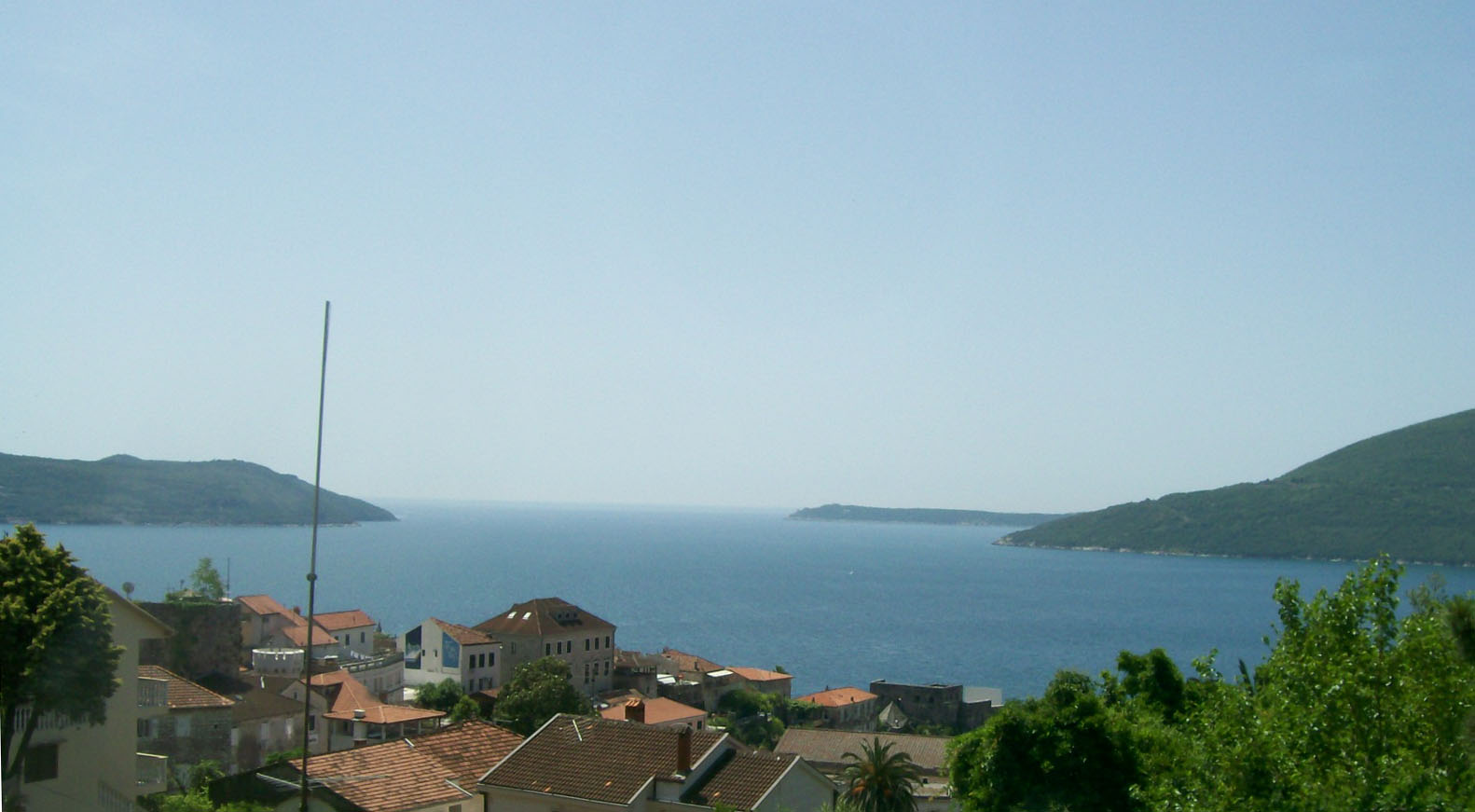
- Prevlaka peninsula area
- Date: 15 July 1996
- Meeting no.: 3,681
- Code: S/RES/1066 (Document)
- Subject: The situation in Croatia
- Voting summary: 15 voted for; None voted against; None abstained
- Result: Adopted

Security Council composition
- Permanent members: China; France; Russia; United Kingdom; United States
- Non-permanent members: Botswana; Chile; Egypt; Guinea-Bissau; Germany; Honduras; Indonesia; Italy; South Korea; Poland

United Nations Security Council resolution 1066, adopted unanimously on 15 July 1996, after recalling previous resolutions on Croatia including resolutions 779 (1992), 981 (1995), 1025 (1995) and 1038 (1996), the Council authorised military observers to continue monitoring the demilitarisation in the Prevlaka peninsula area of Croatia until 15 January 1997.

The Council noted the agreement between Presidents of Croatia and the Federal Republic of Yugoslavia (Serbia and Montenegro) concerning the demilitarisation of the Prevlaka peninsula and the contribution it had made to reducing tension in the region. It also reaffirmed the sovereignty, territorial integrity and independence of Croatia, and the importance of mutual recognition between the successor states in the former Yugoslavia.

The two countries were urged to abide by their commitments and continue negotiations with the view to normalising their bilateral relations. They were encouraged to adopt measures to reduce tension as suggested by the military observers. Meanwhile, the observers and the Implementation Force were called upon to co-operate with one another.

The council also requested the secretary-general to report by 5 January 1997 on the situation in the peninsula and on the progress made by Croatia and Serbia and Montenegro towards resolving their differences.

== See also ==
- Bosnian War
- Breakup of Yugoslavia
- Croatian War of Independence
- List of United Nations Security Council Resolutions 1001 to 1100 (1995–1997)
- Yugoslav Wars
- List of United Nations Security Council Resolutions related to the conflicts in former Yugoslavia
