= United Nations Security Council Resolution 1481 =

UN Security Council Resolution 1481
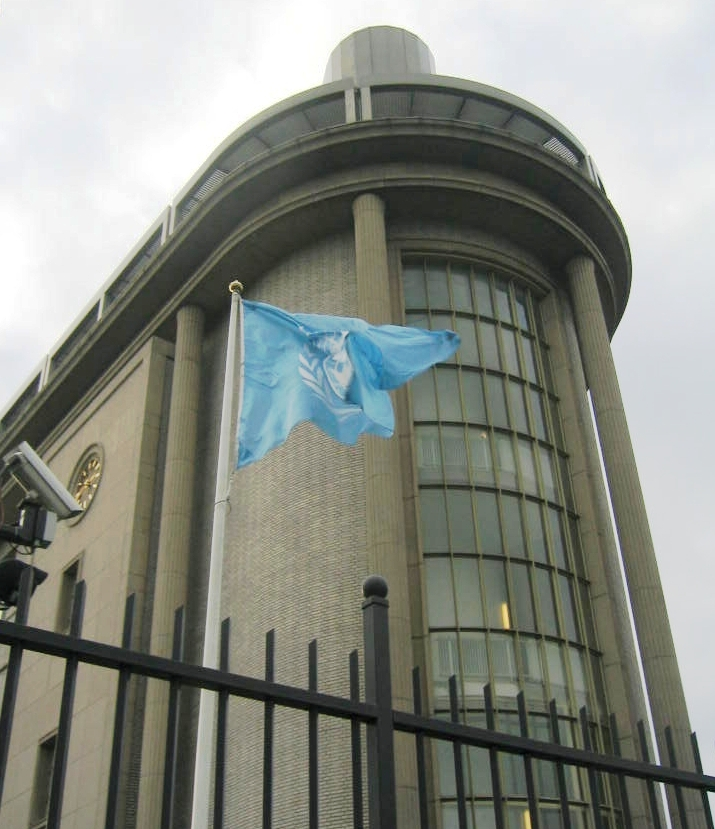
- ICTY building
- Date: 19 May 2003
- Meeting no.: 4,759
- Code: S/RES/1481 (Document)
- Subject: The International Criminal Tribunal for the former Yugoslavia
- Voting summary: 15 voted for; None voted against; None abstained
- Result: Adopted

Security Council composition
- Permanent members: China; France; Russia; United Kingdom; United States
- Non-permanent members: Angola; Bulgaria; Chile; Cameroon; Germany; Guinea; Mexico; Pakistan; Spain; Syria

United Nations Security Council resolution 1481, adopted unanimously on 19 May 2003, after recalling resolutions 827 (1993), 1166 (1998), 1329 (2000), 1411 (2002) and 1431 (2002), the Council amended the statute of the International Criminal Tribunal for the former Yugoslavia (ICTY) to allow temporary judges to adjudicate in pre-trial proceedings in other cases before their appointment to a trial.

The Security Council was convinced of the need to enhance the powers of ad litem judges at the ICTY to allow them to adjudicate in other pre-trial proceedings before their appointment to a trial, and, acting under Chapter VII of the United Nations Charter, amended the statute accordingly. The change was proposed by Theodor Meron, the president of the ICTY, who added that the measure would make efficient use of temporary judges' time and incur no extra costs on the United Nations.

== See also ==
- Bosnian Genocide
- List of United Nations Security Council Resolutions 1401 to 1500 (2002–2003)
- Yugoslav Wars
- List of United Nations Security Council Resolutions related to the conflicts in former Yugoslavia
