= United Nations Security Council Resolution 1431 =

United Nations Security Council resolution

UN Security Council Resolution 1431
- Date: 14 August 2002
- Meeting no.: 4,601
- Code: S/RES/1431 (Document)
- Subject: The International Criminal Tribunal for Rwanda
- Voting summary: 15 voted for; None voted against; None abstained
- Result: Adopted

Security Council composition
- Permanent members: China; France; Russia; United Kingdom; United States
- Non-permanent members: Bulgaria; Cameroon; Colombia; Guinea; Ireland; Mauritius; Mexico; Norway; Singapore; Syria

United Nations Security Council resolution 1431, adopted unanimously on 14 August 2002, after recalling resolutions 827 (1993), 955 (1994), 1165 (1998), 1166 (1998), 1329 (2000) and 1411 (2002), the council established a pool of temporary judges at the International Criminal Tribunal for Rwanda (ICTR) in order for it to complete its work as soon as possible.

The security council was determined to monitor the progress of the ICTR as closely as possible and was convinced of the need to establish a pool of ad litem judges in order to facilitate the conclusion of its work. Under Chapter VII of the United Nations Charter, a pool of temporary judges was created and amendments were made to the statutes of the ICTR and the International Criminal Tribunal for the former Yugoslavia (ICTY) accordingly.

The secretary-general Kofi Annan was requested to make arrangements for the election of 18 temporary judges and provision of resources to the tribunal. Finally, all countries were urged to co-operate with the ICTR in accordance with obligations under Resolution 955; this was partly in reference to Rwanda which had been accused of adopting an uncooperative attitude towards the ICTR by the latter's president in their letters to the council.

== See also ==
- List of United Nations Security Council Resolutions 1401 to 1500 (2002–2003)
- Rwandan genocide
