= United Nations Security Council Resolution 943 =

UN Security Council Resolution 943
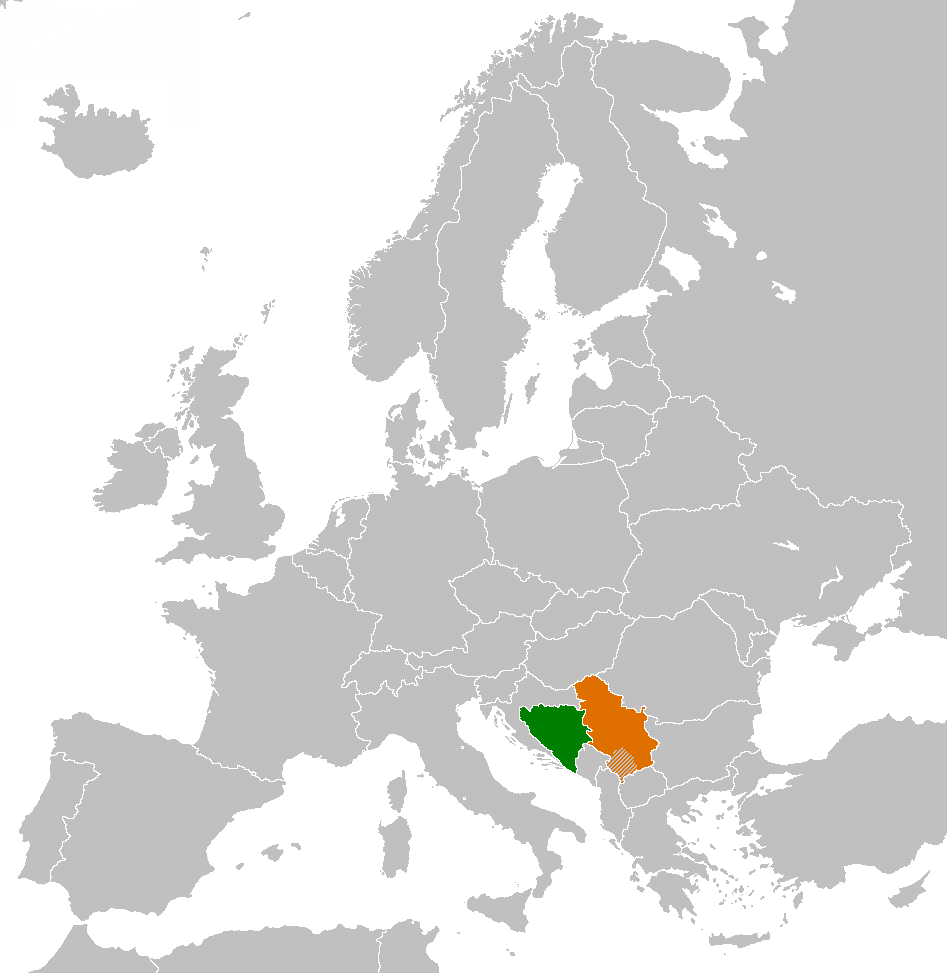
- Bosnia and Herzegovina (green) and Serbia (orange)
- Date: 23 September 1994
- Meeting no.: 3,428
- Code: S/RES/943 (Document)
- Subject: Bosnia and Herzegovina
- Voting summary: 11 voted for; 2 voted against; 2 abstained
- Result: Adopted

Security Council composition
- Permanent members: China; France; Russia; United Kingdom; United States
- Non-permanent members: Argentina; Brazil; Czech Republic; Djibouti; New Zealand; Nigeria; Oman; Pakistan; Rwanda; Spain

United Nations Security Council resolution 943, adopted on 23 September 1994, after reaffirming all resolutions on the situation in Bosnia and Herzegovina, the Council suspended some restrictions against the Federal Republic of Yugoslavia (Serbia and Montenegro) and discussed the closure of the border between both countries.

The Security Council welcomed the decision by Serbia and Montenegro to the proposed territorial settlement for Bosnia and Herzegovina and the decision by both states to continue to uphold the border closure between the two countries, excluding humanitarian aid. Acting under Chapter VII of the United Nations Charter, it was then decided to suspend the following measures against Serbia and Montenegro for an initial period of 100 days if both sides were fully implementing the border closure:

(a) restrictions in resolutions 757 (1992) and 820 (1993) associated with aircraft;
(b) restrictions relating to the ferry service between Bar, Montenegro and Bari, Italy;
(c) measures relating to sport and cultural exchanges.

The Committee of the Security Council established in 724 (1991), was instructed to streamline procedures when dealing with humanitarian assistance requests. Finally, the Secretary-General Boutros Boutros-Ghali was requested to report back every 30 days as to whether both countries are continuing to implement the border closure, and it was announced that the suspension of restrictions would be terminated on the fifth working day following the Secretary-General's report if the border closure was not implemented.

Resolution 943 was adopted by 11 votes to two against (Djibouti, Pakistan) and two abstentions from Nigeria and Rwanda.

== See also ==
- Bosnian Genocide
- Bosnian War
- Breakup of Yugoslavia
- Croatian War of Independence
- List of United Nations Security Council Resolutions 901 to 1000 (1994–1995)
- Yugoslav Wars
