= United Nations Security Council Resolution 1038 =

UN Security Council Resolution 1038
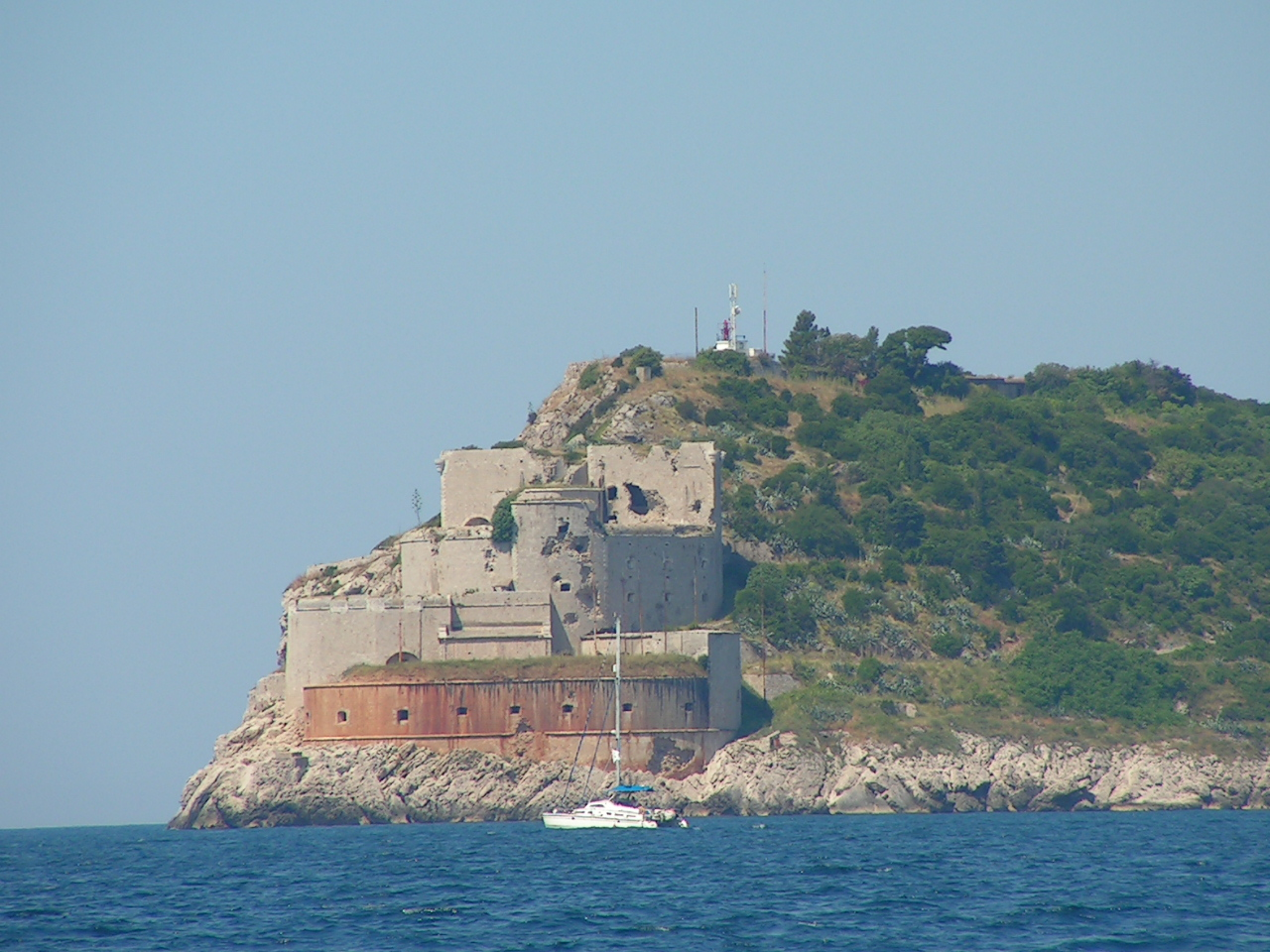
- Austro-Hungarian fortress at the tip of the Prevlaka peninsula.
- Date: 15 January 1996
- Meeting no.: 3,619
- Code: S/RES/1038 (Document)
- Subject: The situation in Croatia
- Voting summary: 15 voted for; None voted against; None abstained
- Result: Adopted

Security Council composition
- Permanent members: China; France; Russia; United Kingdom; United States
- Non-permanent members: Botswana; Chile; Egypt; Guinea-Bissau; Germany; Honduras; Indonesia; Italy; South Korea; Poland

United Nations Security Council resolution 1038, adopted unanimously on 15 January 1996, after recalling previous resolutions on Croatia including resolutions 779 (1992), 981 (1995) and 1025 (1995), the Council authorised the United Nations Mission of Observers in Prevlaka to continue monitoring the demilitarisation in the Prevlaka peninsula area of Croatia.

The Council noted an agreement whereby presidents of Croatia and the Federal Republic of Yugoslavia (Serbia and Montenegro) concerning demilitarisation and emphasised the contribution this had made to the decrease in tension in the region.

The observers would monitor the demilitarisation in the Prevlaka peninsula for a period of three months, and the council would extend this period by a further three months upon receipt of a report by the Secretary-General. By 15 March 1996, the Secretary-General Boutros Boutros-Ghali was requested to report to the council on the situation in the region and progress made by the parties to resolve their differences and with regard to the possible extension of the mandate of the military observers. Finally, the observers and the Implementation Force established in Resolution 1031 (1995) were urged to co-operate with one another.

== See also ==
- Bosnian War
- Breakup of Yugoslavia
- Croatian War of Independence
- List of United Nations Security Council Resolutions 1001 to 1100 (1995–1997)
- Yugoslav Wars
- List of United Nations Security Council Resolutions related to the conflicts in former Yugoslavia
