= United Nations Security Council Resolution 1411 =

UN Security Council Resolution 1411
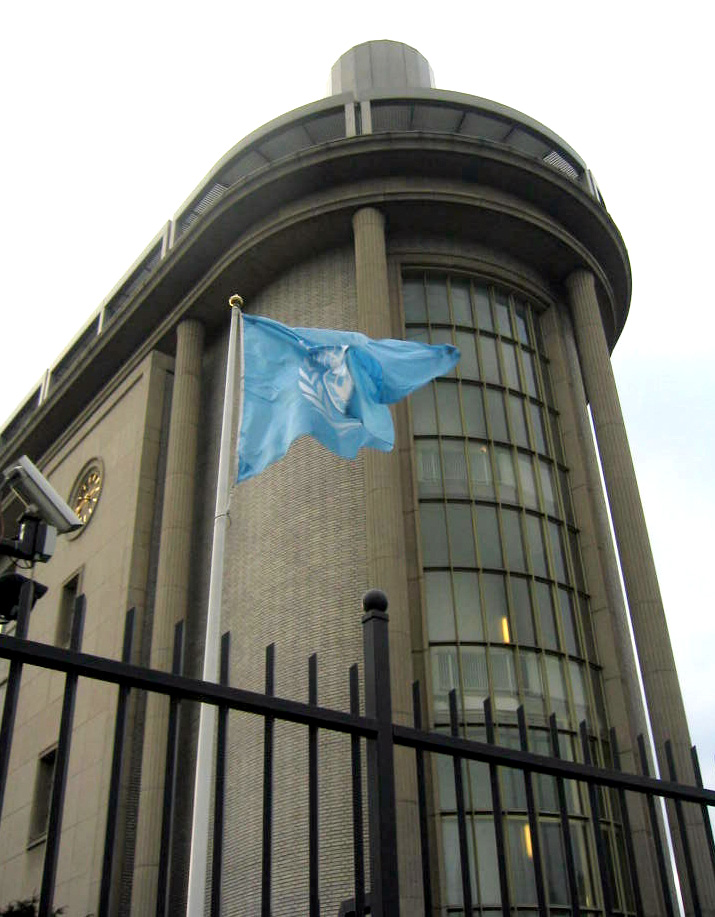
- ICTY building
- Date: 17 May 2002
- Meeting no.: 4,535
- Code: S/RES/1411 (Document)
- Subject: The International Criminal Tribunals for Rwanda and the former Yugoslavia
- Voting summary: 15 voted for; None voted against; None abstained
- Result: Adopted

Security Council composition
- Permanent members: China; France; Russia; United Kingdom; United States
- Non-permanent members: Bulgaria; Cameroon; Colombia; Guinea; Ireland; Mauritius; Mexico; Norway; Singapore; Syria

United Nations Security Council resolution 1411, adopted unanimously on 17 May 2002, after recalling resolutions 827 (1993), 955 (1994), 1165 (1998), 1166 (1998) and 1329 (2000), the Council amended the statutes of the International Criminal Tribunals for Rwanda (ICTR) and the former Yugoslavia (ICTY) to address the issue of judges holding dual nationalities.

The Security Council recognised that judges at the ICTR and ICTY may bear the nationalities of two or more countries and that one such person in this position had been elected to serve at one of the tribunals. It considered that such persons should bear the nationality of the state in which they normally exercise civil and political rights. Acting under Chapter VII of the United Nations Charter, the statutes for both tribunals were amended accordingly to include this provision.

== See also ==
- Bosnian Genocide
- List of United Nations Security Council Resolutions 1401 to 1500 (2002–2003)
- Rwandan genocide
- Yugoslav Wars
- List of United Nations Security Council Resolutions related to the conflicts in former Yugoslavia
