= Arbitration Commission of the Peace Conference on Yugoslavia =

The Arbitration Commission of the Conference on Yugoslavia (commonly known as Badinter Arbitration Committee) was an arbitration body set up by the Council of Ministers of the European Economic Community (EEC) on 27 August 1991 to provide the conference on Yugoslavia with legal advice. Robert Badinter was appointed to President of the five-member Commission consisting of presidents of Constitutional Courts in the EEC. The Arbitration Commission has handed down fifteen opinions on "major legal questions" raised by the conflict between several republics of the Socialist Federal Republic of Yugoslavia (SFRY).

== Background ==
In 1990–1991, contradictions between Serbia and other republics within the federal Yugoslavia (Slovenia and Croatia), economic, political and then ethno-territorial conflicts began to grow.

In the 1990 Slovenian independence referendum, an overwhelming majority of the inhabitants voted for the independence of the republic, similar results were seen in the 1991 Croatian independence referendum, and on June 25, 1991, both republics declared independence. In early March 1991, there were armed clashes in Pakrac between Croats and Serbs. Units of the Yugoslav People's Army were brought into the city to prevent further clashes. On March 9, 1991, protests in Belgrade were suppressed by the army. On March 31, 1991, there was a clash between Croatian police and armed forces from the Croatian Serb-established SAO Krajina at the Plitvice Lakes National Park in which two men were killed. These events culminated in a minor armed conflict in Slovenia and the beginning of the war in Croatia.

In early 1991, the European Community, anticipating an imminent armed conflict in Yugoslavia, offered its mediation assistance to the SFRY leadership. After the SFRY allied government agreed to the mediation of the European Community, the latter conducted a series of negotiations and consultations with the warring parties. On July 7, 1991, the Brioni Agreement was signed, ending the war in Slovenia, from whose territory all Yugoslav army units were withdrawn. The agreement provided for a moratorium on the entry into force of the declarations of independence of Slovenia and Croatia for a period of three months, as well as the need to begin negotiations on the future structure of Yugoslavia. However, the agreement had no impact on the cessation of hostilities in Croatia.

== Commission members ==
- Robert Badinter, president of the Constitutional Council of France
- Roman Herzog, president of the Federal Constitutional Court of Germany
- Aldo Corasaniti, president of the Constitutional Court of Italy
- Francisco Tomás y Valiente, president of the Constitutional Court of Spain
- Irène Pétry, president of the Constitutional Court of Belgium

== Opinions ==
Between late 1991 and the middle of 1993, the Arbitration Commission handed down 15 opinions on legal issues arising from the fragmentation of Yugoslavia.

=== Opinion No. 1 (Dissolution of SFRY) ===
On 20 November 1991 Lord Carrington asked whether the secession of some republics from SFRY preserved its existence, as Serbia and Montenegro claimed, or caused its dissolution with all the republics being equal successors to the SFRY. The commission replied on 29 November 1991, "the Socialist Federative Republic of Yugoslavia is in the process of dissolution".

=== Opinion No. 2 (Self-determination) ===
On 20 November 1991 Lord Carrington asked: "Does the Serbian population in Croatia and Bosnia and Herzegovina, as one of the constituent peoples of Yugoslavia, have the right to self-determination?" The commission concluded on 11 January 1992 "that the Serbian population in Bosnia and Herzegovina and Croatia is entitled to all the rights concerned to minorities and ethnic groups...Republics must afford the members of those minorities and ethnic groups all the human rights and fundamental freedoms recognized in international law, including, where appropriate, the right to choose their nationality". The opinion also extended the principle of uti possidetis to the former Yugoslavia for the first time.

=== Opinion No. 3 (Borders) ===
On 20 November 1991 Lord Carrington asked: "Can the internal boundaries between Croatia and Serbia and between Bosnia and Herzegovina and Serbia be regarded as frontiers in terms of public international law?" Applying the principle of uti possidetis juris, the commission concluded on 11 January 1992, "The boundaries between Croatia and Serbia, between Bosnia and Herzegovina and Serbia, and possibly other adjacent independent states may not be altered except by agreement freely arrived at...Except where otherwise agreed, the former boundaries become frontiers protected by international law".

=== Opinion No. 4 (Bosnia and Herzegovina) ===
The commission was asked whether the independence of Bosnia and Herzegovina should be recognised. The Commission decided against recognition because, unlike the other republics seeking independence, Bosnia and Herzegovina had not yet held a referendum on independence.

=== Opinion No. 5 (Croatia) ===
The Commission considered the application of Croatia for the recognition of its independence. The Commission ruled that Croatia's independence should not yet be recognized because the new Croatian Constitution did not incorporate the protections for minorities required by European Community. In response to this decision, the President of Croatia Franjo Tuđman wrote to Badinter to give assurances that the deficit would be remedied, and the European Community then recognized Croatia.

=== Opinion No. 6 (Macedonia) ===
The Commission recommended for the European Community to accept the request of the then Republic of Macedonia for recognition, as the Republic had given the necessary guarantees to respect human rights and international peace and security. However, the European Community was initially reluctant to accept the recommendations because of Greek opposition.

=== Opinion No. 7 (Slovenia) ===
The Commission recommended for the European Community to recognise Slovenia.

=== Interlocutory decision ===
The Commission rejected Serbian and Montenegrin objections to its competence to respond to three references that it had received from Lord Carrington, which resulted in Opinions 8, 9 and 10.

=== Opinion No. 8 (Completion of the process of the dissolution of the SFRY) ===
The Commission decided that the legal process of the dissolution of the SFRY had completed and so the SFRY no longer existed.

=== Opinion No. 9 (Settlement of problems of state succession) ===
The Commission considered state succession, resulting from the cessation of the SFRY, should be resolved. It ruled that it should be resolved by mutual agreement between the several successor states, with an equitable division of the international assets and obligations of the former SFRY. It also decided that the membership of the SFRY in international organizations could not be continued by any successor state, but each state would have to apply for membership anew.

=== Opinion No. 10 (Federal Republic of Yugoslavia - Serbia and Montenegro) ===
In this decision, the Commission ruled that the FRY (Serbia and Montenegro) could not legally be considered a continuation of the former SFRY, but it was a new state. Thus, the European Community should not automatically recognize the FRY but apply the same criteria as for the recognition of the other post-SFRY states.

== Text ==
The text of the first ten opinions of the Badinter Commission has been published in the European Journal of International Law. Opinions 1-3 are reproduced in 3 EJIL 1 (1992) pp. 182ff. Opinions 4-10 are reproduced in 4 EJIL 1 (1993) pp. 74ff.

== Criticism of Opinion No. 3 ==
Peter Radan, an Australian legal academic of Serbian descent, has criticised the Badinter Commission's interpretation of the SFRY Constitution. Apart from principles of international law, the Badinter Commission sought to justify the relevance of the Badinter Borders Principle by reference to article 5 of the 1974 Constitution of the Yugoslavia. The Commission said that the Badinter Borders Principle applies all the more readily to the Republics since the second and fourth paragraphs of Article 5 of the Constitution of the SFRY stipulated that the Republics' territories and boundaries could not be altered without their consent.

Article 5 stipulates:

(1) The territory of the SFRY is indivisible and consists of the territories of its socialist republics.

(2) A republic's territory cannot be altered without the consent of that republic, and the territory of an autonomous province — without the consent of that autonomous province.

(3) A border of the SFRY cannot be altered without the concurrence of all republics and autonomous provinces.

(4) A border between republics can only be altered on the basis of their agreement, and in the case of a border of an autonomous province — on the basis of its concurrence.

In referring to article 5, his criticism is that the Badinter Commission was guilty of selective quoting.

Radan's reason for this opinion is that in relying on paragraphs 2 and 4 of article 5, the Badinter Commission ignored the provisions of paragraphs 1 and 3. In doing so it was justifying the division of the SFRY and the alteration of its international borders in violation of paragraphs 1 and 3. Radan argues that the territorial integrity of republics and the sanctity of their borders referred to in paragraphs 2 and 4 of article 5 only applied in the context of the Yugoslav state whose own territorial integrity and borders remained in place. According to Radan, a republic seeking to violate the provisions of paragraphs 1 and 3 of article 5 could hardly reap the guarantees contained within paragraphs 2 and 4. Consequently, he argues that article 5 provides no support for the application of the Badinter Borders Principle to the fragmentation of the SFRY.

Based upon the above analysis of the reasoning of the Badinter Commission in Opinion No 3 Radan concludes that neither the international law principles of respect for the territorial status quo and uti possidetis nor the provisions of article 5 of the Constitution of the SFRY 1974 provides any justification for the Badinter Borders Principle" and that in redrawing the new borders between independent states "it may even be necessary to facilitate orderly and voluntary transfers of parts of the population."

== See also ==
- United Nations Security Council Resolution 777
- International Court of Justice advisory opinion on Kosovo's declaration of independence
- Memorandum of the Serbian Academy of Sciences and Arts
- Succession of Yugoslavia
