= United Nations Security Council Resolution 808 =

UN Security Council Resolution 808
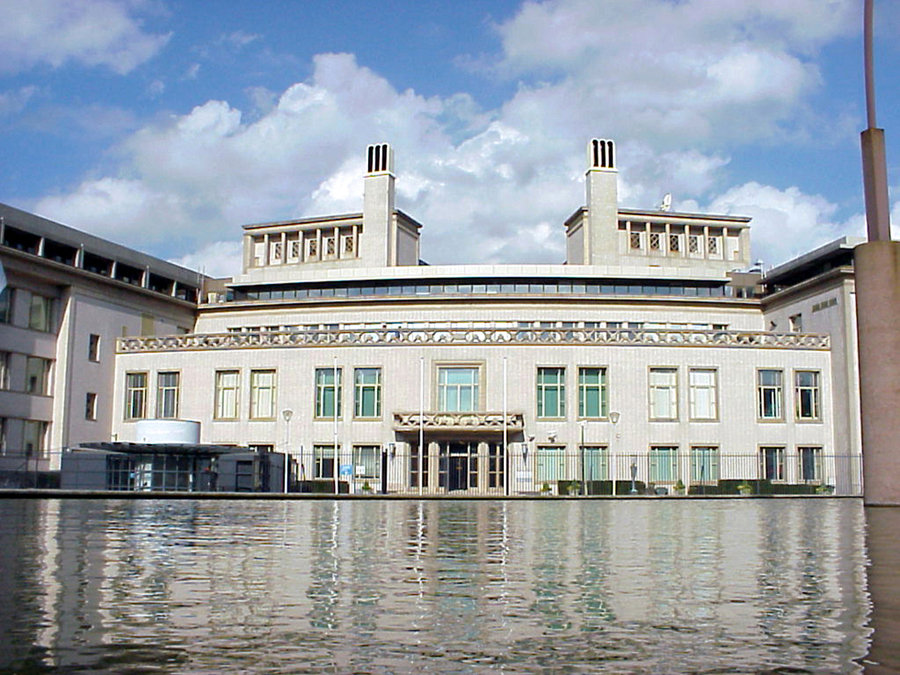
- Front of the tribunal building in The Hague
- Date: 22 February 1993
- Meeting no.: 3,175
- Code: S/RES/808 (Document)
- Subject: Tribunal (Former Yugoslavia)
- Voting summary: 15 voted for; None voted against; None abstained
- Result: Adopted

Security Council composition
- Permanent members: China; France; Russia; United Kingdom; United States
- Non-permanent members: Brazil; Cape Verde; Djibouti; Hungary; Japan; Morocco; New Zealand; Pakistan; Spain; Venezuela

United Nations Security Council resolution 808, adopted unanimously on 22 February 1993, after reaffirming Resolution 713 (1991) and subsequent resolutions on the situation in former Yugoslavia, including resolutions 764 (1992), 771 (1992) and 780 (1992), the council, after stating its determination to put an end to crimes such as ethnic cleansing and other violations of international humanitarian law, decided that an international tribunal should be established for the prosecution of persons responsible for serious violations of international humanitarian law committed in former Yugoslavia since 1991. This later became known as the International Criminal Tribunal for the former Yugoslavia.

The resolution then requested the Secretary-General Boutros Boutros-Ghali to submit, in no later than 60 days after the adoption of the current resolution, a report on specific proposals and options relating to the implementation of the decision to establish that tribunal, including whether it has a basis in law. At the same time, suggestions from member states would be considered, and after the adoption of Resolution 808, proposals were submitted by France, Italy and Sweden, amongst others. The tribunal would be fully established in Resolution 827 (1993).

== See also ==
- Breakup of Yugoslavia
- Bosnian Genocide
- Bosnian War
- Croatian War of Independence
- List of United Nations Security Council Resolutions 801 to 900 (1993–1994)
- Yugoslav Wars
- List of United Nations Security Council Resolutions related to the conflicts in former Yugoslavia
