= United Nations Security Council Resolution 1329 =

UN Security Council Resolution 1329
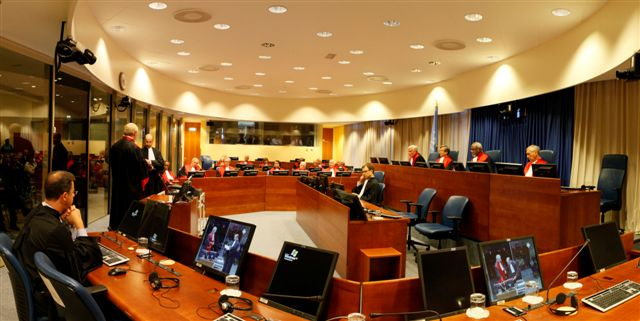
- Courtroom I at the ICTY. Photograph provided courtesy of the ICTY.
- Date: 30 November 2000
- Meeting no.: 4,240
- Code: S/RES/1329 (Document)
- Subject: International Criminal Tribunal for the former Yugoslavia and International Criminal Tribunal for Rwanda
- Voting summary: 15 voted for; None voted against; None abstained
- Result: Adopted

Security Council composition
- Permanent members: China; France; Russia; United Kingdom; United States
- Non-permanent members: Argentina; Bangladesh; Canada; Jamaica; Malaysia; Mali; Namibia; Netherlands; Tunisia; Ukraine

United Nations Security Council resolution 1329, adopted unanimously on 30 November 2000, after recalling resolutions 827 (1993) and 955 (1994), the Council enlarged the appeals chambers at both the International Criminal Tribunal for Rwanda (ICTR) and the International Criminal Tribunal for the former Yugoslavia (ICTY), proposed the election of two additional judges at the ICTR and established a pool of ad litem judges at the ICTY.

The security council remained convinced that persons responsible for violations of international humanitarian law in Rwanda and the former Yugoslavia. Noting progress made to improve the procedures at both tribunals, it also emphasised the need for both to complete trials at the earliest possible date. The tribunals had preferred to try civilian, military and paramilitary leaders over minor actors.

Acting under Chapter VII of the United Nations Charter, the council established a pool of ad litem judges at the ICTY and enlarged the appeals chambers at the ICTR and ICTY. Two additional judges would also be appointed at the ICTR to deal with its increasing workload. The Secretary-General Kofi Annan was requested to make preparations for the elections of the two additional judges at the ICTR and of the 27 ad litem judges at the ICTY.

All countries were urged to co-operate with both tribunals and welcomed co-operation already given. Finally, the secretary-general was asked to submit a report concerning the date ending of the temporal jurisdiction of the ICTY.

== See also ==
- Bosnian Genocide
- Rwandan genocide
- List of United Nations Security Council Resolutions 1301 to 1400 (2000–2002)
- Yugoslav Wars
