= United Nations Security Council Resolution 1166 =

UN Security Council Resolution 1166
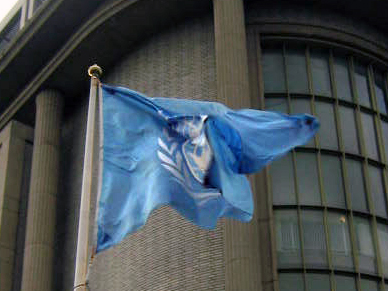
- Flag of the ICTY
- Date: 13 May 1998
- Meeting no.: 3,878
- Code: S/RES/1166 (Document)
- Subject: The International Tribunal for the former Yugoslavia (ICTY)
- Voting summary: 15 voted for; None voted against; None abstained
- Result: Adopted

Security Council composition
- Permanent members: China; France; Russia; United Kingdom; United States
- Non-permanent members: Bahrain; Brazil; Costa Rica; Gabon; Gambia; Japan; Kenya; Portugal; Slovenia; Sweden

United Nations Security Council resolution 1166, adopted unanimously on 13 May 1998, after recalling Resolution 827 (1993), the council established a third trial chamber at the International Criminal Tribunal for the former Yugoslavia (ICTY). It was the first amendment to the Statute of the Tribunal.

The Security Council was convinced that the prosecution of those responsible for violations of international humanitarian law in the former Yugoslavia would contribute to the maintenance of peace in the region. It also recognised the need to increase the number of trial judges and chambers at the ICTY in order to try the large number of people awaiting trial.

Acting under Chapter VII of the United Nations Charter, the council established a third trial chamber at the ICTY and decided that three additional judges would be elected as soon as possible to serve in the new chamber. A list of nominations of between six and nine judges would be established. Finally, the Secretary-General Kofi Annan was requested to make arrangements to enhance the effective functioning of the ICTY.

== See also ==
- Bosnian Genocide
- List of United Nations Security Council Resolutions 1101 to 1200 (1997–1998)
- Yugoslav Wars
- List of United Nations Security Council Resolutions related to the conflicts in former Yugoslavia
