= United Nations Security Council Resolution 827 =

UN Security Council Resolution 827
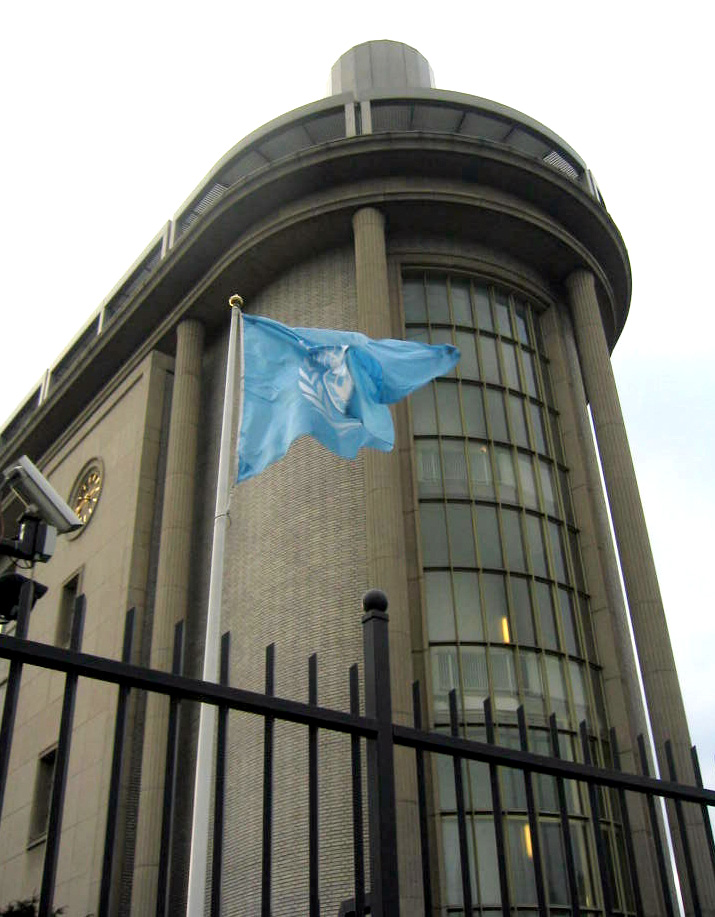
- International Criminal Tribunal for the former Yugoslavia
- Date: 25 May 1993
- Meeting no.: 3,217
- Code: S/RES/827(1993) (Document)
- Subject: Tribunal (Former Yugoslavia)
- Voting summary: 15 voted for; None voted against; None abstained
- Result: Adopted

Security Council composition
- Permanent members: China; France; Russia; United Kingdom; United States
- Non-permanent members: Brazil; Cape Verde; Djibouti; Hungary; Japan; Morocco; New Zealand; Pakistan; Spain; Venezuela

United Nations Security Council resolution 827, adopted unanimously on 25 May 1993, after reaffirming Resolution 713 (1991) and all subsequent resolutions on the topic of the former Yugoslavia, approved report S/25704 of Secretary-General Boutros Boutros-Ghali, with the Statute of the International Tribunal as an annex, establishing the International Criminal Tribunal for the former Yugoslavia (ICTY).

Still alarmed at violations of international humanitarian law in former Yugoslavia and especially in Bosnia and Herzegovina, including mass killings, systematic detention and rape of women, and ethnic cleansing, the resolution determined that the situation continued to pose a threat to international peace and security, further announcing its intention to bring an end to such crimes and bring justice to the victims. The council decided that the establishment of a tribunal and the prosecution of persons responsible would address such violations, reaffirming its decision in Resolution 808 (1993).

Acting under Chapter VII of the United Nations Charter, the council established the International Criminal Tribunal for the former Yugoslavia for crimes committed in the territory of the former Yugoslavia between 1 January 1991 and a date to be determined by the Council upon the restoration of peace in the region. Until the appointment of a prosecutor, evidence would continue to be gathered by the Commission of Experts established in Resolution 780 (1992).

The council then requested the secretary-general to submit suggestions received from countries regarding the rules of procedure and evidence called for in Article 15 of the Statute of the International Tribunal to judges at the tribunal. It also decided that all member states would co-operate with the ICTY and its organs in accordance with the Statute of the International Tribunal. At the same time, contributions from states, intergovernmental and non-governmental organisations to the tribunal was urged.

The resolution decided that the determination of the seat of the International Tribunal is subject to the conclusion of appropriate arrangements between the United Nations and the Netherlands, noting that it may sit elsewhere if considered necessary, and that the work of the tribunal will not affect the right of victims to compensation. Finally, it asked that Boutros Boutros-Ghali immediately implement the current resolution and make arrangements for the effective functioning of the tribunal.

== See also ==
- Bosnian War
- Breakup of Yugoslavia
- Croatian War of Independence
- List of United Nations Security Council Resolutions 801 to 900 (1993–1994)
- Yugoslav Wars
- List of United Nations Security Council Resolutions related to the conflicts in former Yugoslavia
