= United Nations Security Council Resolution 1062 =

UN Security Council Resolution 1062
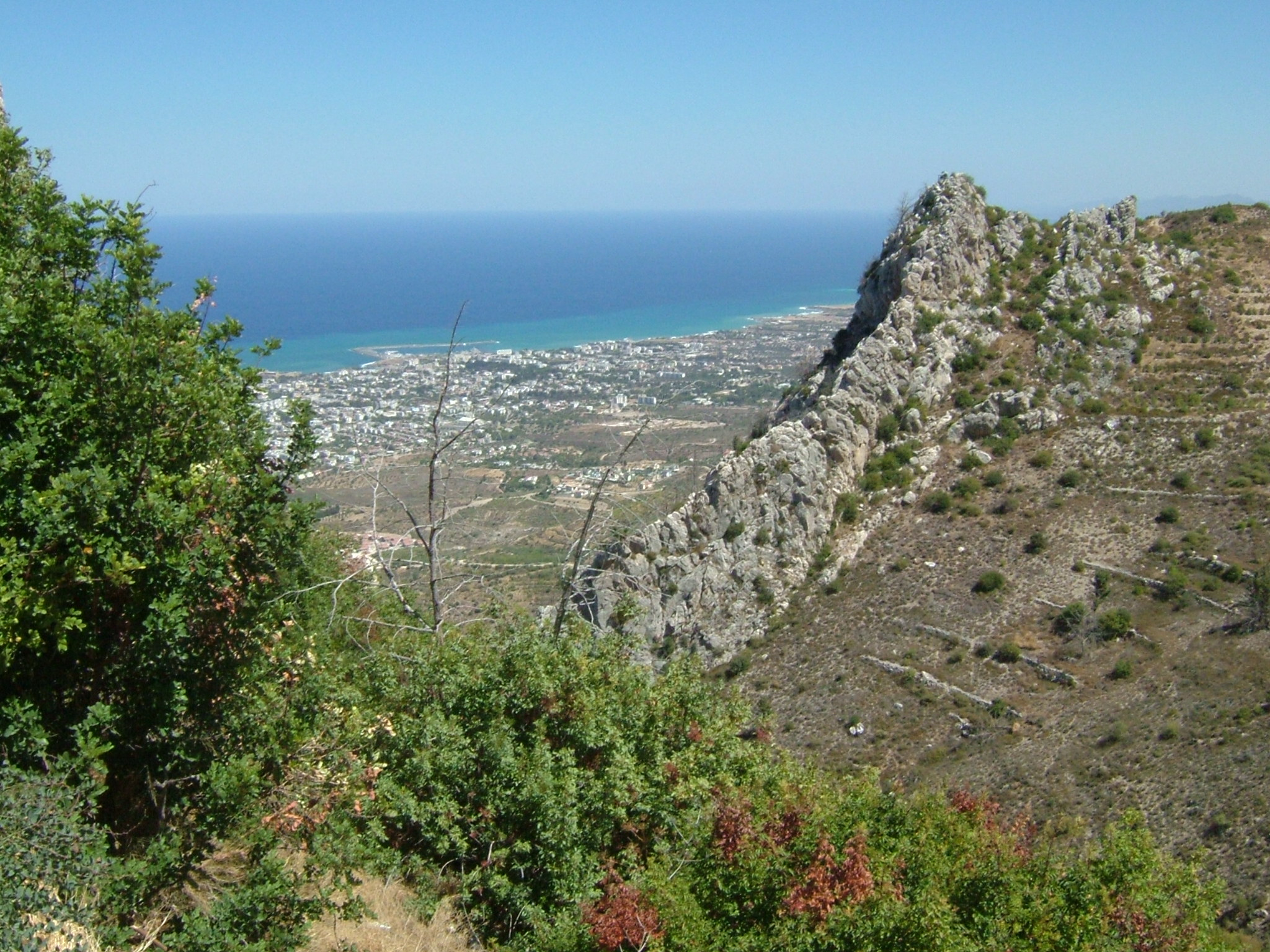
- Coast of Kyrenia in the Turkish part of Cyprus
- Date: 28 June 1996
- Meeting no.: 3,675
- Code: S/RES/1062 (Document)
- Subject: The situation in Cyprus
- Voting summary: 15 voted for; None voted against; None abstained
- Result: Adopted

Security Council composition
- Permanent members: China; France; Russia; United Kingdom; United States
- Non-permanent members: Botswana; Chile; Egypt; Guinea-Bissau; Germany; Honduras; Indonesia; Italy; South Korea; Poland

United Nations Security Council resolution 1062, adopted unanimously on 28 June 1996, after recalling all resolutions on Cyprus, particularly resolutions 186 (1964), 939 (1994) and 1032 (1995), the Council expressed concern at the lack of progress in the political dispute in Cyprus and extended the mandate of the United Nations Peacekeeping Force in Cyprus (UNFICYP) until 31 December 1996.

The Security Council noted that there had been no progress towards a political solution, no measures introduced to prohibit the firing of weapons near the buffer zone, and that the freedom of movement of UNFICYP was being restricted in Northern Cyprus.

After extending the mandate of UNFICYP, the Council welcomed the appointment of Han Sung-Joo as the Special Representative of the Secretary-General for Cyprus. It deplored the incident on 3 June 1996 in which a Greek Cypriot guard was killed in the buffer zone and Turkish Cypriot soldiers prevented UNFICYP troops from assisting the guard and to investigate the incident. Concern was also expressed at buildup of military forces and armaments in the Republic of Cyprus, and tension was also increasing over military training flights. The aim was to demilitarise the island eventually.

The military authorities on both sides were asked to:

(a) respect the integrity of the buffer zone and allow complete freedom of movement to UNFICYP;
(b) enter into negotiations, in accordance with Resolution 839 (1993) with UNFICYP regarding the prohibition of firing weapons;
(c) assist in demining and clearing booby-trapped areas;
(d) cease military construction in the vicinity of the buffer zone;
(e) extend the 1989 unmanning agreement to cover areas of the buffer zone.

The Turkish Cypriots were also urged to do more to improve the living situation of the Greek Cypriots and Maronites in their territories. Greek Cypriots were called to end discrimination against Turkish Cypriots. Both parties were called upon to end the current impasse and resume direct negotiations. The decision of the European Union to begin accession talks with Cyprus was an important new development that could facilitate a comprehensive agreement.

The Secretary-General Boutros Boutros-Ghali was requested to report back to the council by 10 December 1996 on developments on the island.

== See also ==
- Cyprus dispute
- List of United Nations Security Council Resolutions 1001 to 1100 (1995–1997)
- United Nations Buffer Zone in Cyprus
- Turkish Invasion of Cyprus
