= United Nations Security Council Resolution 927 =

UN Security Council Resolution 927
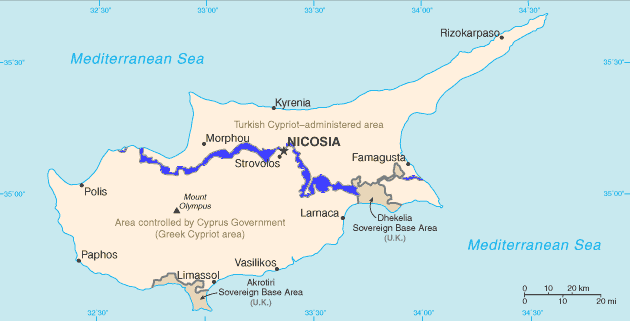
- Divided Cyprus
- Date: 15 June 1994
- Meeting no.: 3,390
- Code: S/RES/927 (Document)
- Subject: Cyprus
- Voting summary: 15 voted for; None voted against; None abstained
- Result: Adopted

Security Council composition
- Permanent members: China; France; Russia; United Kingdom; United States
- Non-permanent members: Argentina; Brazil; Czech Republic; Djibouti; New Zealand; Nigeria; Oman; Pakistan; Rwanda; Spain

United Nations Security Council resolution 927, adopted unanimously on 15 June 1994, after recalling resolutions 186 (1964), 831 (1993) and 889 (1993), the council expressed concern at the lack of progress in the political dispute in Cyprus and extended the mandate of the United Nations Peacekeeping Force in Cyprus (UNFICYP) until 31 December 1994.

Reviewing a report by the Secretary-General Boutros Boutros-Ghali, the council expressed concern at no significant reduction in the number of foreign troops or defence spending. All military authorities on both sides were called upon to ensure that no incidents occurred along the buffer zone and to co-operate with the UNFICYP, especially with regard to extending the 1989 unmanning agreement to cover all areas of the buffer zone. The secretary-general was requested to review the structure and strength of the peacekeeping force with a view to restructuring it if necessary.

All parties concerned were urged to commit themselves to a reduction of foreign troops in Cyprus and reduce defence spending, as a first step towards the withdrawal of non-Cypriot forces as proposed in the "Set of Ideas". The resolution also requested that parties, in accordance with Resolution 839 (1993), to enter discussions with a view to prohibiting live ammunition and firing weapons within the range of the buffer zone. The leaders of Cyprus and Northern Cyprus were urged to promote tolerance and reconciliation amongst the two communities.

The secretary-general was requested to report back to the council by 15 December 1994, while the council noted that it would conduct a thorough and comprehensive review of the situation, including the role of the United Nations in Cyprus.

== See also ==
- Cyprus dispute
- List of United Nations Security Council Resolutions 901 to 1000 (1994–1995)
- United Nations Buffer Zone in Cyprus
- Turkish Invasion of Cyprus
