= United Nations Security Council Resolution 952 =

UN Security Council Resolution 952
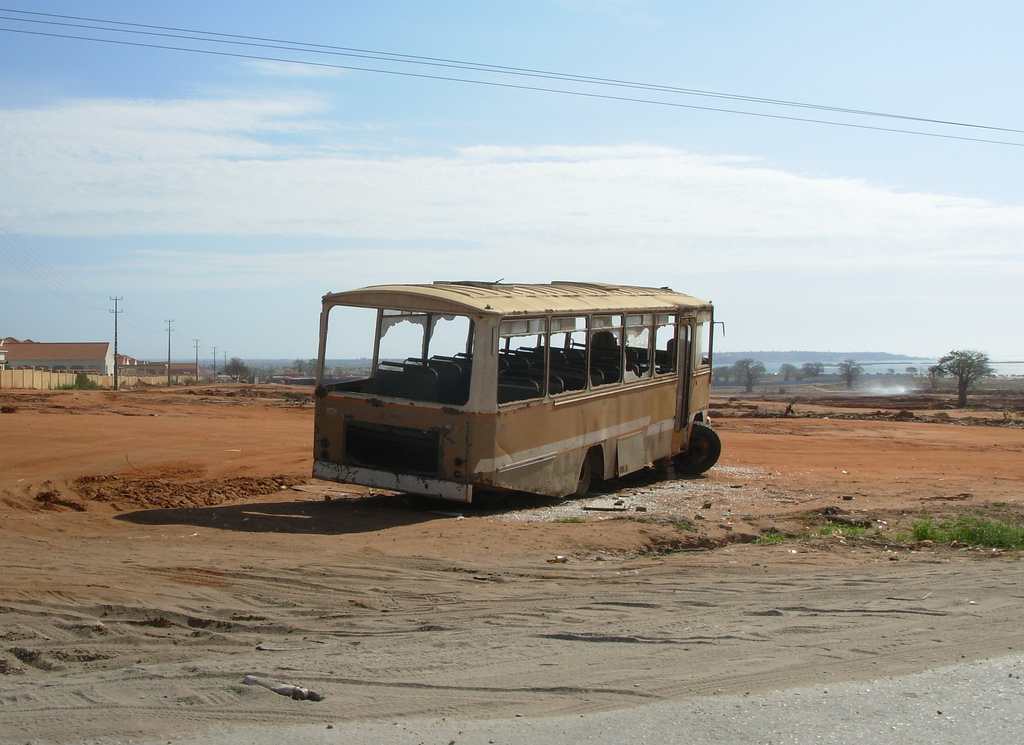
- Abandoned bus in Angola
- Date: 27 October 1994
- Meeting no.: 3,445
- Code: S/RES/952 (Document)
- Subject: The situation in Angola
- Voting summary: 15 voted for; None voted against; None abstained
- Result: Adopted

Security Council composition
- Permanent members: China; France; Russia; United Kingdom; United States
- Non-permanent members: Argentina; Brazil; Czech Republic; Djibouti; New Zealand; Nigeria; Oman; Pakistan; Rwanda; Spain

United Nations Security Council resolution 952, adopted unanimously on 27 October 1994, after reaffirming Resolution 696 (1991) and all subsequent resolutions on Angola, the Council discussed the implementation of a ceasefire in the country and extended the mandate of the United Nations Angola Verification Mission II (UNAVEM II) until 8 December 1994.

The security council began by reaffirming the importance of the peace agreements, including the Accordos de Paz, in Angola. It was encouraged by the progress made during the peace talks in Lusaka, Zambia and any further delays were unacceptable. There was still concern for the continuing hostilities in the country and their impact on the population, humanitarian assistance, the peace talks and the mandate of UNAVEM II. All countries were reminded to observe the arms embargo on UNITA in accordance with Resolution 864 (1993).

After extending the mandate of UNAVEM II until 8 December 1994, the council authorised an increase in strength of the peacekeeping operation to its previous level of 350 military observers and 126 police observers with local staff upon hearing from the Secretary-General Boutros Boutros-Ghali that an agreement had been finalised. Any further expansion of the United Nations presence in Angola would also depend on a report from the secretary-general. All parties were urged to abide by the commitments they made in Lusaka and to establish and respect a durable ceasefire.

The continuation of military hostilities was deplored by the council in violation of resolutions 922 (1994), 932 (1994) and 945 (1994). At the same time, the deteriorating humanitarian situation was also deplored, including the laying of land mines which inhibited humanitarian efforts and demanding all parties guaranteed safe passage for humanitarian personnel. The release of humanitarian relief workers who disappeared on 27 August 1994, was demanded and all parties were urged to co-operate with the United Nations investigation in this regard.

Finally, the secretary-general was requested to report back to the council on developments in Lusaka and the situation in Angola.

== See also ==
- Angolan Civil War
- List of United Nations Security Council Resolutions 901 to 1000 (1994–1995)
- Lusaka Protocol
- United Nations Angola Verification Mission III
