= United Nations Security Council Resolution 914 =

United Nations Security Council resolution

UN Security Council Resolution 914
- UNPROFOR medal bar
- Date: 27 April 1994
- Meeting no.: 3,369
- Code: S/RES/914 (Document)
- Subject: Bosnia and Herzegovina-Croatia
- Voting summary: 15 voted for; None voted against; None abstained
- Result: Adopted

Security Council composition
- Permanent members: China; France; Russia; United Kingdom; United States
- Non-permanent members: Argentina; Brazil; Czech Republic; Djibouti; New Zealand; Nigeria; Oman; Pakistan; Rwanda; Spain

United Nations Security Council resolution 914, adopted unanimously on 27 April 1994, after recalling resolutions 908 (1994) and 913 (1994), the council, acting under Chapter VII of the United Nations Charter, increased the strength of the United Nations Protection Force (UNPROFOR) by up to 6,550 additional troops, 150 military observers and 275 civilian police monitors.

== See also ==
- Bosnian War
- Breakup of Yugoslavia
- Croatian War of Independence
- List of United Nations Security Council Resolutions 901 to 1000 (1994–1995)
- Yugoslav Wars
