= United Nations Security Council Resolution 969 =

UN Security Council Resolution 969
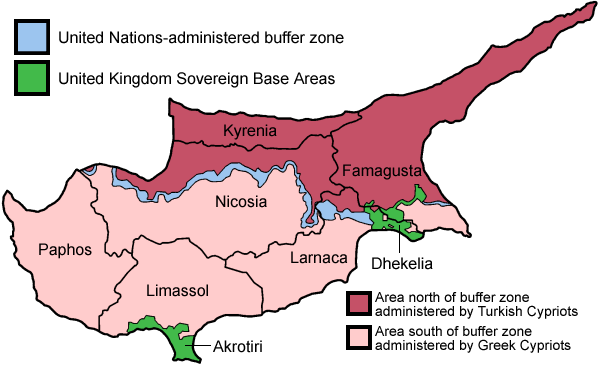
- Divided Cyprus
- Date: 21 December 1994
- Meeting no.: 3,484
- Code: S/RES/969 (Document)
- Subject: Cyprus
- Voting summary: 15 voted for; None voted against; None abstained
- Result: Adopted

Security Council composition
- Permanent members: China; France; Russia; United Kingdom; United States
- Non-permanent members: Argentina; Brazil; Czech Republic; Djibouti; New Zealand; Nigeria; Oman; Pakistan; Rwanda; Spain

United Nations Security Council resolution 969, adopted unanimously on 21 December 1994, after recalling resolutions 186 (1964), 831 (1993) and 889 (1993), the Council expressed concern at the lack of progress in the political dispute in Cyprus and extended the mandate of the United Nations Peacekeeping Force in Cyprus (UNFICYP) until 30 June 1995.

Reviewing a report by the Secretary-General Boutros Boutros-Ghali, the Council called on the military authorities on both sides were called upon to ensure that no incidents occurred along the buffer zone and to co-operate with the UNFICYP, especially with regard to extending the 1989 unmanning agreement to cover all areas of the buffer zone. The Secretary-General was requested to keep under review the structure and strength of the peacekeeping force with a view to restructuring it if necessary.

All parties concerned were urged to commit themselves to a reduction of foreign troops in Cyprus and reduce defence spending, as a first step towards the withdrawal of non-Cypriot forces as proposed in the "Set of Ideas". The resolution also requested that parties, in accordance with Resolution 839 (1993), to enter discussions with a view to prohibiting live ammunition and firing weapons within the range of the buffer zone. The leaders of Cyprus and Northern Cyprus were urged to promote tolerance and reconciliation amongst the two communities, welcoming the secretary-general's efforts to maintain contacts with both leaders.

The secretary-general was requested to report back to the council by 15 June 1995 on developments on the island.

== See also ==
- Cyprus dispute
- List of United Nations Security Council Resolutions 901 to 1000 (1994–1995)
- United Nations Buffer Zone in Cyprus
- Turkish Invasion of Cyprus
