= United Nations Security Council Resolution 953 =

UN Security Council Resolution 953
- UNOSOM medal bar
- Date: 31 October 1994
- Meeting no.: 3,446
- Code: S/RES/953 (Document)
- Subject: Somalia
- Voting summary: 15 voted for; None voted against; None abstained
- Result: Adopted

Security Council composition
- Permanent members: China; France; Russia; United Kingdom; United States
- Non-permanent members: Argentina; Brazil; Czech Republic; Djibouti; New Zealand; Nigeria; Oman; Pakistan; Rwanda; Spain

United Nations Security Council resolution 953, adopted unanimously on 31 October 1994, after recalling Resolution 783 (1992) and all relevant resolutions on the situation in Somalia, the Council extended the mandate of the United Nations Operation in Somalia II (UNOSOM II) for an interim period ending 4 November 1994.

The extension was approved after it was decided on 20 October 1994 to send a mission to Somalia, as discussed in Resolution 946 (1994) and that it should consider the report of this mission before deciding on the future of UNOSOM II.

== See also ==
- History of Somalia
- List of United Nations Security Council Resolutions 901 to 1000 (1994–1995)
- Somali Civil War
