= United Nations Security Council Resolution 966 =

UN Security Council Resolution 966
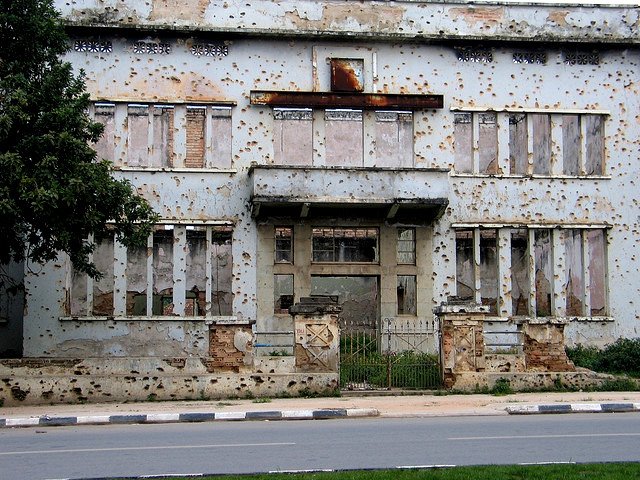
- Building with bullet holes in Huambo
- Date: 8 December 1994
- Meeting no.: 3,477
- Code: S/RES/966 (Document)
- Subject: Angola
- Voting summary: 15 voted for; None voted against; None abstained
- Result: Adopted

Security Council composition
- Permanent members: China; France; Russia; United Kingdom; United States
- Non-permanent members: Argentina; Brazil; Czech Republic; Djibouti; New Zealand; Nigeria; Oman; Pakistan; Rwanda; Spain

United Nations Security Council resolution 966, adopted unanimously on 8 December 1994, after reaffirming resolutions 696 (1991), 868 (1993) and all resolutions on Angola, the Council discussed the monitoring of a ceasefire in the country and extended the mandate of the United Nations Angola Verification Mission II (UNAVEM II) until 8 February 1995.

The council reaffirmed the importance of the implementation of the Acordos de Paz. It welcomed the signing of the Lusaka Protocol in Lusaka, Tanzania, on 20 November 1994 as an important step towards reconciliation and peace in Angola. If there was a ceasefire, the United Nations presence could be expanded significantly, and further delays in implementing the peace accords were unacceptable. Reports of renewed clashes in the country after the implementation of the ceasefire caused concern in the Council which would have effects on the implementation of the Lusaka Protocol, the civilian population and the mandate of UNAVEM II. All states were reminded to implement the arms embargo against UNITA in Resolution 864 (1993).

The mandate of UNAVEM II was extended in order to monitor the ceasefire provided for in the Lusaka Protocol, commending both the Government of Angola and UNITA for signing it. The ceasefire would be closely monitored by the Security Council and the Secretary-General Boutros Boutros-Ghali was to keep the Council informed in this regard. It welcomed his intention, in conjunction with Resolution 952 (1994) to restore the strength of UNAVEM II to its previous level, dependent on compliance with the ceasefire. Personnel would also be deployed in the countryside as a confidence-building measure.

The secretary-general was asked to report on a new United Nations operation in Angola (that later became known as the United Nations Angola Verification Mission III) with the intention of reviewing the role of the United Nations by 8 February 1995. Meanwhile, the resumption of humanitarian relief operations in Angola was welcomed. The parties had to guarantee the safety of humanitarian workers. Finally, the Secretary-General was to inform the council on developments in Angola and on a comprehensive mine clearance programme for the country.

Resolution 966 was the last resolution to concern UNAVEM II, as a new peacekeeping mission, the United Nations Angola Verification Mission III, was established in Resolution 976 in February 1995.

== See also ==
- Angolan Civil War
- List of United Nations Security Council Resolutions 901 to 1000 (1994–1995)
