= United Nations Security Council Resolution 947 =

UN Security Council Resolution 947
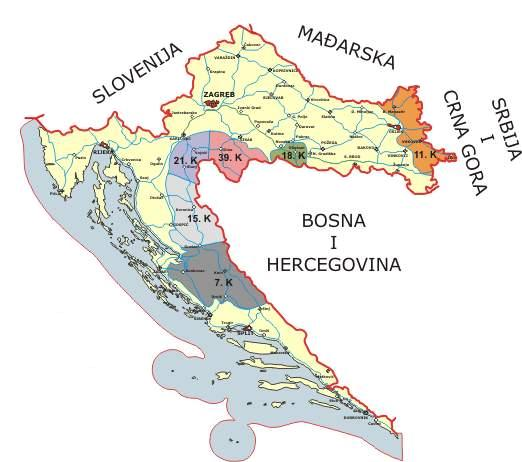
- Distribution of Croatian territory in 1995
- Date: 30 September 1994
- Meeting no.: 3,434
- Code: S/RES/947 (Document)
- Subject: Bosnia and Herzegovina
- Voting summary: 15 voted for; None voted against; None abstained
- Result: Adopted

Security Council composition
- Permanent members: China; France; Russia; United Kingdom; United States
- Non-permanent members: Argentina; Brazil; Czech Republic; Djibouti; New Zealand; Nigeria; Oman; Pakistan; Rwanda; Spain

United Nations Security Council resolution 947, adopted unanimously on 30 September 1994, after recalling all resolutions on the situation on the former Yugoslavia including Resolution 908 (1994), the Council discussed the situation in Croatia and extended the mandate of the United Nations Protection Force (UNPROFOR) until 31 March 1995.

The security council wanted a negotiated solution to the conflict in the former Yugoslavia and the mutual respect for international boundaries between countries in the region was stressed. Key aspects of the United Nations peace plan and particularly Resolution 871 (1993) had yet to be implemented. Meanwhile, UNPROFOR played an important role in preventing hostilities and creating conditions for an overall peace settlement.

Acting under Chapter VII of the United Nations Charter, the council extended the mandate of UNPROFOR until 31 March 1995 and urged all parties to co-operate with the peacekeeping force and ensure its freedom of movement. The Secretary-General Boutros Boutros-Ghali was requested to report back to the council by 20 January 1995 on the state of the United Nations peace plan for Croatia and in this regard its mandate would be reviewed. He also had to report on progress made towards the opening of roads and railways to the United Nations Protected Areas and the rest of Croatia, the water and power supply, and the opening of the Adria oil pipeline.

The right of all displaced persons to return to their homes was reaffirmed, with assistance from the international community. All statements and commitments made under duress, especially in regard to territory, were invalid. Concern was expressed that Status of Forces Agreements had not been finalised Croatia, Macedonia and the Federal Republic of Yugoslavia Serbia and Montenegro, and all were urged to conclude the agreements without delay.

The Bosnian Serbs were called upon to respect the territorial integrity of Croatia, and that the restoration of authority in the pink zones must be completed under supervision of UNPROFOR to avoid further destabilisation of the region.

== See also ==
- Bosnian War
- Breakup of Yugoslavia
- Croatian War of Independence
- List of United Nations Security Council Resolutions 901 to 1000 (1994–1995)
- Yugoslav Wars
- List of United Nations Security Council Resolutions related to the conflicts in former Yugoslavia
