= United Nations Security Council Resolution 998 =

UN Security Council Resolution 998
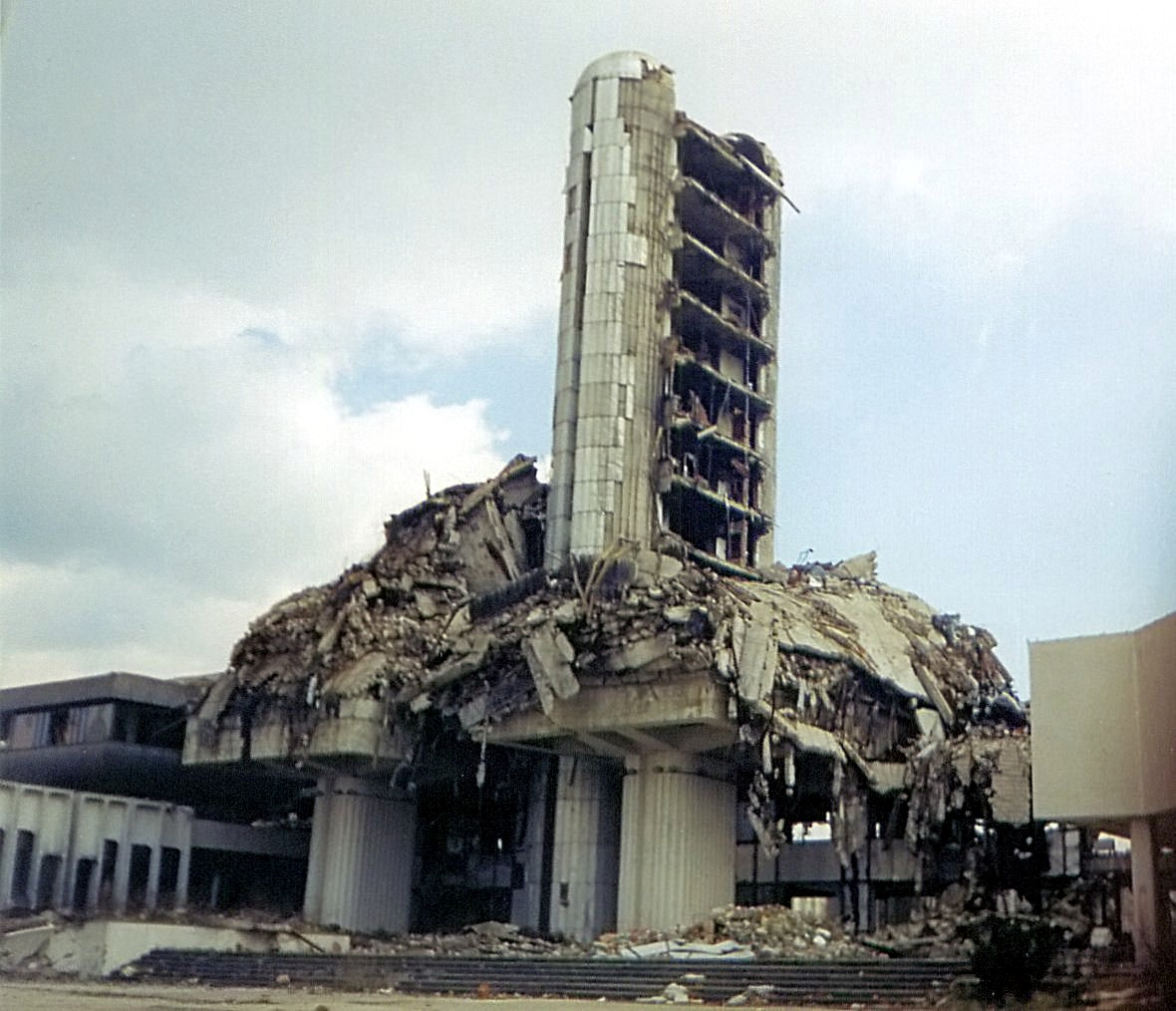
- Destroyed media centre in Sarajevo
- Date: 16 June 1995
- Meeting no.: 3,543
- Code: S/RES/998 (Document)
- Subject: Bosnia and Herzegovina
- Voting summary: 13 voted for; None voted against; 2 abstained
- Result: Adopted

Security Council composition
- Permanent members: China; France; Russia; United Kingdom; United States
- Non-permanent members: Argentina; Botswana; Czech Republic; Germany; Honduras; Indonesia; Italy; Nigeria; Oman; Rwanda

United Nations Security Council resolution 998, adopted on 16 June 1995, after reaffirming all resolutions on the conflicts in the former Yugoslavia, in particular Resolution 982 (1994), the council established a rapid reaction force of up to 12,500 personnel within the United Nations Protection Force (UNPROFOR) in Bosnia and Herzegovina following attacks on it and the overall deteriorating situation.

A letter received from the Secretary-General Boutros Boutros-Ghali on 9 June 1995 included proposals from France, the Netherlands and United Kingdom to strengthen UNPROFOR by the creation of a rapid reaction force within it. The rapid reaction force would form an integral part of the existing peacekeeping operation and that UNPROFOR would remain impartial. The council was concerned by the continuing armed hostilities in Bosnia and Herzegovina and that a further ceasefire was not agreed. Attacks on UNPROFOR and civilians by Bosnian Serb forces were condemned.

Acting under Chapter VII of the United Nations Charter, the Council demanded that Bosnian Serb forces release all detained UNPROFOR personnel and that all parties respect the safety of UNPROFOR. The conflict would not be resolved through military means and negotiations had to begin, reiterating that the Bosnian Serb side accept the Contact Group peace plan as a starting point. A complete ceasefire, cessation of hostilities and unimpeded access to humanitarian organisations, particularly to the safe areas and Sarajevo, was demanded. The resolution called on the parties to respect the safety of civilians and the status of the safe areas.

It was then decided to increase the size of UNPROFOR by an additional 12,500 personnel, an increase of over 50%, as provided for in the letter of the Secretary-General. Any further changes should consider the security of the force and reduce the danger to which they were exposed.

China and Russia abstained from the voting on Resolution 998 after expressing concern that UNPROFOR should remain a strictly peacekeeping force, which was approved by the other members of the council.

== See also ==
- Bosnian War
- Breakup of Yugoslavia
- Croatian War of Independence
- List of United Nations Security Council Resolutions 901 to 1000 (1994–1995)
- Yugoslav Wars
