= United Nations Security Council Resolution 988 =

UN Security Council Resolution 988
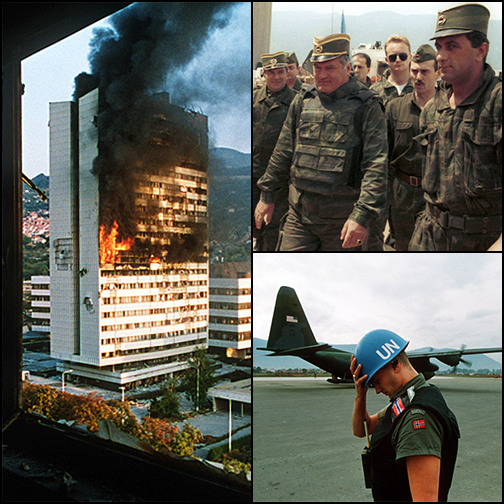
- Bosnian War
- Date: 21 April 1995
- Meeting no.: 3,522
- Code: S/RES/988 (Document)
- Subject: Bosnia and Herzegovina
- Voting summary: 13 voted for; None voted against; 2 abstained
- Result: Adopted

Security Council composition
- Permanent members: China; France; Russia; United Kingdom; United States
- Non-permanent members: Argentina; Botswana; Czech Republic; Germany; Honduras; Indonesia; Italy; Nigeria; Oman; Rwanda

United Nations Security Council resolution 988, adopted on 21 April 1995, after reaffirming all resolutions on the situation in the former Yugoslavia, in particular resolutions 943 (1994) and 970 (1995), the Council noted measures by the Federal Republic of Yugoslavia (Serbia and Montenegro) to continue the border closure with Bosnia and Herzegovina and therefore extended the partial suspension of sanctions against Serbia and Montenegro for a further 75 days until 5 July 1995.

Although the border remained closed between the two countries, the Council noted that helicopter flights had possibly crossed the border and that it was being investigated by the International Conference on the Former Yugoslavia (ICFY) mission.

The security council confirmed that measures in Resolution 943 would be suspended until 5 July 1995. Additional fuel beyond immediate needs for a flight or ferry voyage was not permitted unless authorised under the Committee in Resolution 724 (1992). All countries were called upon to respect the sovereignty, territorial integrity and international borders of countries in the region. Member States were also required to strengthen the ICFY mission by making available additional resources. Serbia and Montenegro was urged to co-operate with the mission and the investigation into the helicopter flights and to restore communication links between it and areas Bosnia and Herzegovina under Bosnian Serb control.

The committee was urged to give priority to applications for humanitarian assistance. The Secretary-General Boutros Boutros-Ghali was requested to report every 30 days on matters relating to the border closure and that all relevant resolutions were being implemented. If it was not being implemented, the suspension would be terminated on the fifth working day after the Secretary-General's report.

Resolution 988 was adopted by 13 votes to none against, and 2 abstentions from China and Russia.

== See also ==
- Bosnian War
- Breakup of Yugoslavia
- Croatian War of Independence
- List of United Nations Security Council Resolutions 901 to 1000 (1994–1995)
- Yugoslav Wars
