= United Nations Security Council Resolution 987 =

UN Security Council Resolution 987
- Date: 19 April 1995
- Meeting no.: 3,521
- Code: S/RES/987 (Document)
- Subject: Bosnia and Herzegovina
- Voting summary: 15 voted for; None voted against; None abstained
- Result: Adopted

Security Council composition
- Permanent members: China; France; Russia; United Kingdom; United States
- Non-permanent members: Argentina; Botswana; Czech Republic; Germany; Honduras; Indonesia; Italy; Nigeria; Oman; Rwanda

United Nations Security Council resolution 987, adopted unanimously on 19 April 1995, after reaffirming all resolutions on the conflicts in the former Yugoslavia, in particular Resolution 982 (1994), the Council called for measures to ensure the safety, security and freedom of movement of the United Nations Protection Force (UNPROFOR) in Bosnia and Herzegovina following attacks on it.

The council was worried about the continued fighting in Bosnia and Herzegovina and violations of resolutions 781 (1992) and 816 (1993) despite agreements on a ceasefire and the unacceptability to resolve the conflict through military means. It also noted the recent attacks on UNPROFOR personnel resulting in French fatalities and the need to respect the status of United Nations personnel.

Acting under Chapter VII of the United Nations Charter, the Council emphasised the responsibility of the parties and others concerned to guarantee the safety, security and freedom of movement for UNPROFOR, calling for all attacks and intimidation against the Force to cease. The Secretary-General Boutros Boutros-Ghali was requested to propose measures that could be taken against to prevent attacks against UNPROFOR and enable it to carry out its mandate.

The parties in Bosnia and Herzegovina were urged to agree an extension to the ceasefire and cessation of hostilities and resume negotiations for an overall political settlement.

== See also ==
- Bosnian War
- Breakup of Yugoslavia
- Croatian War of Independence
- List of United Nations Security Council Resolutions 901 to 1000 (1994–1995)
- Yugoslav Wars
