= United Nations Security Council Resolution 957 =

UN Security Council Resolution 957
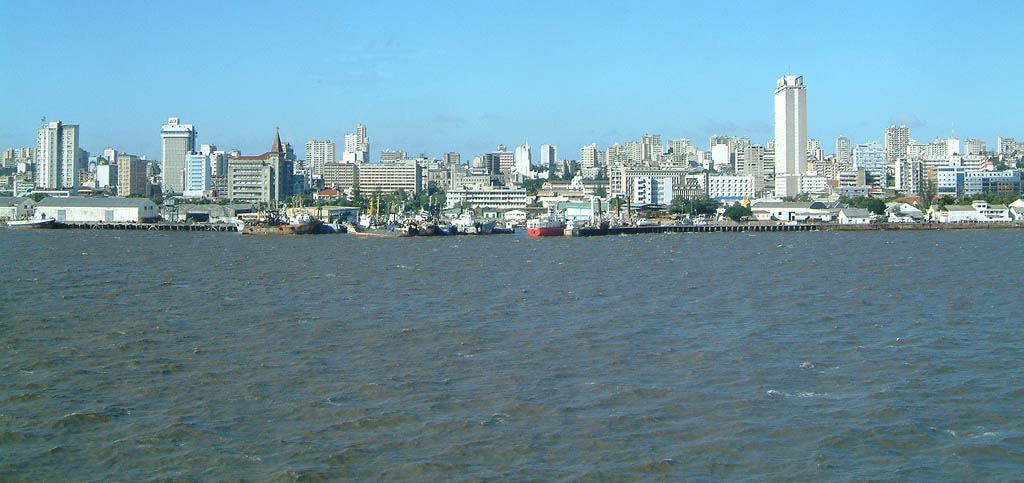
- Maputo, capital of Mozambique
- Date: 15 November 1994
- Meeting no.: 3,458
- Code: S/RES/957 (Document)
- Subject: Mozambique
- Voting summary: 15 voted for; None voted against; None abstained
- Result: Adopted

Security Council composition
- Permanent members: China; France; Russia; United Kingdom; United States
- Non-permanent members: Argentina; Brazil; Czech Republic; Djibouti; New Zealand; Nigeria; Oman; Pakistan; Rwanda; Spain

United Nations Security Council resolution 957, adopted unanimously on 15 November 1994, after reaffirming Resolution 782 (1992) and all subsequent resolutions on Mozambique, the Council welcomed the recent elections on 27–29 October 1994 in accordance with the Rome General Peace Accords and extended the mandate of the United Nations Operation in Mozambique (ONUMOZ) until a new government took office, but no later than 15 December 1994, with a full withdrawal by 31 January 1995.

The Security Council reiterated its intention to endorse the election results when the United Nations declared the vote to be free and fair, calling upon all Mozambican parties to accept the election results. The results were endorsed in Resolution 960. It further urged them to complete the process of national reconciliation with a multi-party democracy and observe democratic principles.

ONUMOZ and various civilian logisticians, mine clearance and training personnel, military specialists, staff officers and a small detachment of infantry were authorised to complete their residual operations prior to its withdrawal on or before 31 January 1995, in accordance with a timetable proposed by the Secretary-General. The Secretary-General Boutros Boutros-Ghali was required to submit a final report on the termination of ONUMOZ.

== See also ==
- Elections in Mozambique
- History of Mozambique
- List of United Nations Security Council Resolutions 901 to 1000 (1994–1995)
