= United Nations Security Council Resolution 913 =

UN Security Council Resolution 913
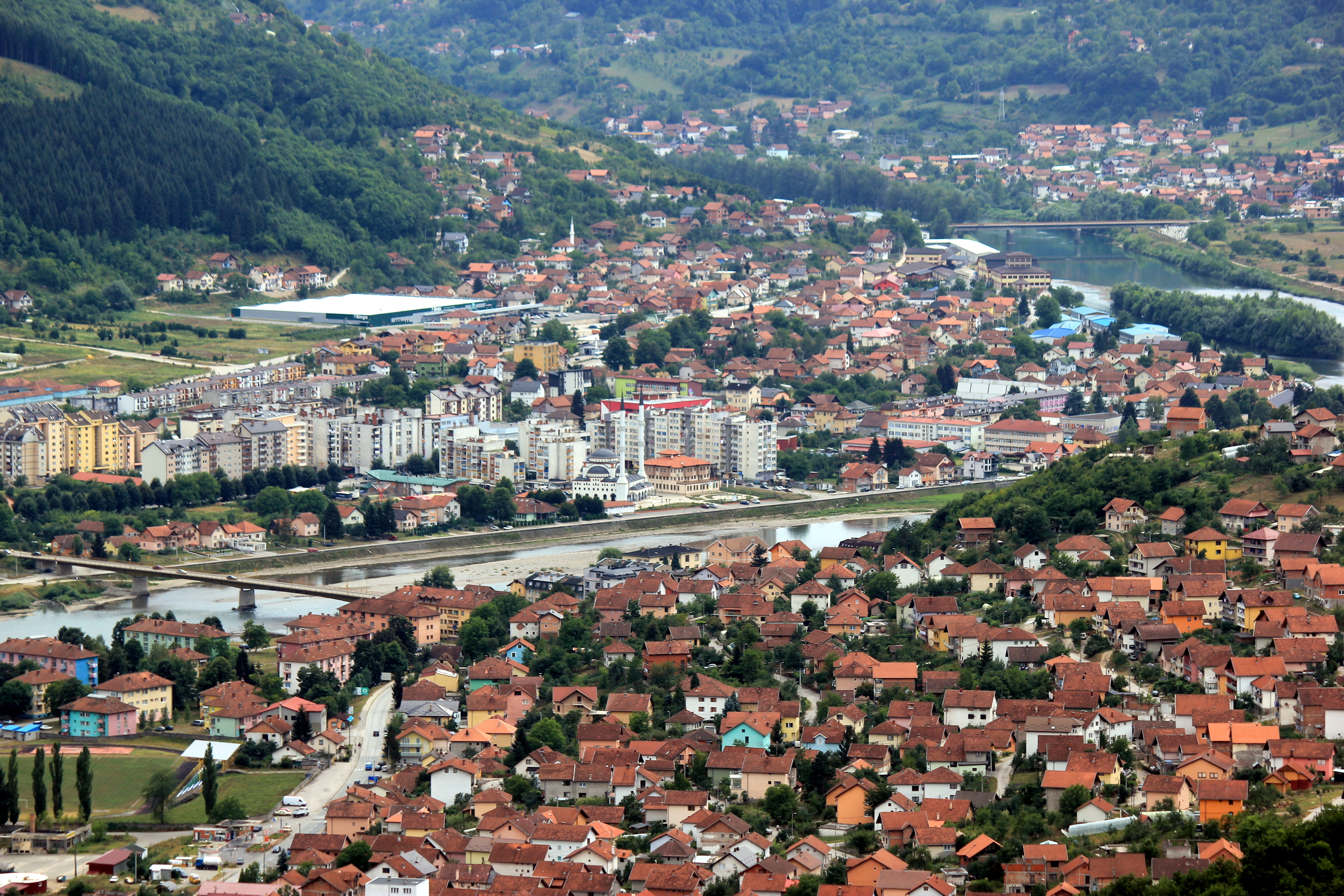
- View of Goražde
- Date: 22 April 1994
- Meeting no.: 3,367
- Code: S/RES/913 (Document)
- Subject: Bosnia and Herzegovina
- Voting summary: 15 voted for; None voted against; None abstained
- Result: Adopted

Security Council composition
- Permanent members: China; France; Russia; United Kingdom; United States
- Non-permanent members: Argentina; Brazil; Czech Republic; Djibouti; New Zealand; Nigeria; Oman; Pakistan; Rwanda; Spain

United Nations Security Council resolution 913 was adopted unanimously on 22 April 1994, after reaffirming all resolutions on the situation in Bosnia and Herzegovina and also Resolution 908 (1994). The Council discussed the situation in the safe area of Goražde and a settlement of the conflict.

The council expressed concern about the continued fighting around the city of Goražde and its impact throughout Bosnia and Herzegovina and the negotiations. The city was a United Nations Protected Area and the Bosnian Serb Army was strongly condemned for its offensive against it and the civilian population, in addition to attacks on humanitarian relief workers which were in violation of international humanitarian law. The Bosnian Serbs were condemned further for their failure to uphold commitments and negotiate in good faith. Obstacles to the freedom of movement and attacks on the United Nations Protection Force (UNPROFOR) were condemned, with the Council determined that it make full use of its mandate in resolutions 824 (1993), 836 (1993), 844 (1993) and 908 (1994) to contribute towards a durable ceasefire in the region.

Acting under Chapter VII of the United Nations Charter, an immediate ceasefire was demanded between the Government of Bosnia and Herzegovina and the Bosnian Serbs, while attacks against Goražde were condemned. Secretary-General Boutros Boutros-Ghali was invited to ensure that UNPROFOR is able to monitor the situation, including measures to put heavy weapons under United Nations control. This allowed for the use of air strikes if there was no compliance with this provision.

The resolution called for an end to provocations in the safe areas and demanded the release of United Nations personnel detained by Bosnian Serb forces. The freedom of movement of UNPROFOR was demanded while a review of the number of required troops would take place by 30 April 1994. The Council underlined the need for a political settlement with close co-operation with the representatives of the United States, Russia, United Nations and European Union. Finally, further measures would be taken if required.

== See also ==
- Bosnian Genocide
- Bosnian War
- Breakup of Yugoslavia
- Croatian War of Independence
- List of United Nations Security Council Resolutions 901 to 1000 (1994–1995)
- Yugoslav Wars
