= List of United Nations Security Council Resolutions 901 to 1000 =

This is a list of United Nations Security Council Resolutions 901 to 1000 adopted between 4 March 1994 and 23 June 1995.

Resolution	Date	Vote	Concerns
901	4 March 1994	15–0–0	Extends mandate of the United Nations Observer Mission in Georgia
902	11 March 1994	15–0–0	Confidence-building measures relating to Varosha and Nicosia International Airport, Cyprus
903	16 March 1994	15–0–0	Extends and strengthens mandate of the United Nations Angola Verification Mission II
904	18 March 1994	Adopted without vote	Measures guaranteeing the safety and protection of the Palestinian civilians in territories occupied by Israel in the aftermath of the Cave of the Patriarchs massacre
905	23 March 1994	15–0–0	Extends mandate of the United Nations Mission in Haiti
906	25 March 1994	15–0–0	Extends mandate of the United Nations Observer Mission in Georgia, political settlement in the Georgian–Abkhazian conflict
907	29 March 1994	15–0–0	Referendum for the self-determination of the people of Western Sahara
908	31 March 1994	15–0–0	Extends mandate and increase in personnel of the United Nations Protection Force
909	5 April 1994	15–0–0	Extends mandate of the United Nations Assistance Mission for Rwanda, implementation of the Arusha Accords
910	14 April 1994	15–0–0	Exempts United Nations reconnaissance team from sanctions against Libya
911	21 April 1994	15–0–0	Extends mandate of the United Nations Observer Mission in Liberia, implementation of peace agreements
912	21 April 1994	15–0–0	Adjusts mandate of the United Nations Assistance Mission for Rwanda due to situation, settlement of conflict
913	22 April 1994	15–0–0	Situation in Bosnia and Herzegovina and safe area of Goražde, settlement of conflict
914	27 April 1994	15–0–0	Additional increase in personnel of the United Nations Protection Force
915	4 May 1994	15–0–0	Establishes the United Nations Aouzou Strip Observer Group in the Aouzou Strip
916	5 May 1994	15–0–0	Extends mandate of the United Nations Operation in Mozambique, implementation of Rome General Peace Accords
917	6 May 1994	15–0–0	Expands sanctions against Haiti until the return of President Jean-Bertrand Aristide
918	17 May 1994	Adopted without vote	Expands mandate of the United Nations Assistance Mission for Rwanda, imposes arms embargo on Rwanda
919	25 May 1994	15–0–0	Terminates arms embargo and other restrictions against South Africa
920	26 May 1994	15–0–0	Extends mandate of the United Nations Observer Mission in El Salvador, implementation of peace agreements
921	26 May 1994	15–0–0	Extends mandate of the United Nations Disengagement Observer Force
922	31 May 1994	15–0–0	Extends mandate of the United Nations Angola Verification Mission II, peace settlement
923	31 May 1994	15–0–0	Extends mandate of the United Nations Operation in Somalia II, national reconciliation
924	1 June 1994	15–0–0	Calls for ceasefire in Yemeni civil war, dispatch of fact-finding mission
925	8 June 1994	15–0–0	Extends mandate of the United Nations Assistance Mission for Rwanda, deploys additional battalions
926	13 June 1994	15–0–0	Terminates the United Nations Aouzou Strip Observer Group
927	15 June 1994	15–0–0	Extends mandate of the United Nations Peacekeeping Force in Cyprus, implementation of confidence-building measures
928	20 June 1994	15–0–0	Extends mandate of the United Nations Observer Mission Uganda–Rwanda
929	22 June 1994	10–0–5 (abstentions: Brazil, China, New Zealand, Nigeria, Pakistan)	Establishes temporary multinational operation for humanitarian purposes in Rwanda
930	27 June 1994	15–0–0	Terminates United Nations Observer Mission in South Africa, removes South Africa from seized agenda
931	29 June 1994	15–0–0	Ceasefire in Yemeni civil war
932	30 June 1994	15–0–0	Extends mandate of the United Nations Angola Verification Mission II
933	30 June 1994	15–0–0	Extends mandate of the United Nations Mission in Haiti
934	30 June 1994	15–0–0	Extends mandate of the United Nations Observer Mission in Georgia
935	1 July 1994	15–0–0	Requests Secretary-General to establish a Commission to investigate the Rwandan genocide
936	8 July 1994	15–0–0	Appoints Richard Goldstone as Prosecutor at the International Criminal Tribunal for the former Yugoslavia
937	21 July 1994	14–0–0 (absent: Rwanda)	Expands and extends mandate of the United Nations Observer Mission in Georgia and co-operation with the Commonwealth of Independent States peacekeeping force
938	28 July 1994	14–0–0 (absent: Rwanda)	Extends mandate of the United Nations Interim Force in Lebanon
939	29 July 1994	14–0–0 (absent: Rwanda)	Settlement of Cyprus dispute, confidence-building measures
940	31 July 1994	12–0–2 (abstentions: Brazil, China; absent: Rwanda)	Authorises multinational force to restore legitimate President of Haiti Jean-Bertrand Aristide and removal of military junta
941	23 September 1994	15–0–0	Violations of international humanitarian law in Banja Luka, Bijeljina and other areas of Bosnia and Herzegovina
942	23 September 1994	14–0–1 (abstention: China)	Reinforces measures concerning safe areas in Bosnia and Herzegovina under control of Bosnian Serb forces
943	23 September 1994	11-2-2 (against: Djibouti, Pakistan; abstentions: Nigeria, Rwanda)	Closure of border between Federal Republic of Yugoslavia (Serbia and Montenegro) and Bosnia and Herzegovina, excluding humanitarian aid
944	29 September 1994	13–0–2 (abstentions: Brazil, Russia)	Termination of measures in resolutions 841 (1993), 873 (1993) and 917 (1994) concerning Haiti upon return of President Jean-Bertrand Aristide
945	29 September 1994	15–0–0	Extends mandate of the United Nations Angola Verification Mission II, implementation of peace agreements
946	30 September 1994	14–0–1 (abstention: United States)	Extends mandate of the United Nations Operation in Somalia II
947	30 September 1994	15–0–0	Extends mandate of the United Nations Protection Force, implementation of peace plan for Croatia and Security Council resolutions
948	15 October 1994	14–0–1 (abstention: Brazil)	Restoration of democracy in Haiti, return of President Jean-Bertrand Aristide, lifting of sanctions
949	15 October 1994	15–0–0	Demands Iraq withdraw forces from border with Kuwait
950	21 October 1994	15–0–0	Extends mandate of the United Nations Observer Mission in Liberia, peace process
951	21 October 1994	Adopted without vote	Vacancy and election at the International Court of Justice
952	27 October 1994	15–0–0	Extends mandate of the United Nations Angola Verification Mission II, implementation of ceasefire
953	31 October 1994	15–0–0	Extends mandate of the United Nations Operation in Somalia II
954	4 November 1994	15–0–0	Extends mandate of the United Nations Operation in Somalia II for a final time, withdrawal of personnel
955	8 November 1994	13–1–1 (against: Rwanda; abstention: China)	Establishes the International Criminal Tribunal for Rwanda
956	10 November 1994	15–0–0	Termination of status of Palau as Trust Territory
957	15 November 1994	15–0–0	Extends mandate of the United Nations Operation in Mozambique until new government takes office
958	19 November 1994	15–0–0	Permits the use of air strikes in Croatia in addition to Bosnia and Herzegovina
959	19 November 1994	15–0–0	Efforts of the United Nations Protection Force to ensure implementation of Security Council resolutions in safe areas in Bosnia and Herzegovina
960	21 November 1994	15–0–0	Endorses results of elections in Mozambique
961	23 November 1994	15–0–0	Extends mandate of the United Nations Observer Mission in El Salvador for final time, implementation of peace agreements
962	29 November 1994	15–0–0	Extends mandate of the United Nations Disengagement Observer Force
963	29 November 1994	15–0–0	Admission of Palau to the United Nations
964	29 November 1994	13–0–2 (abstentions: Brazil, Russia)	Strengthens advance team of the United Nations Mission in Haiti
965	30 November 1994	15–0–0	Extends and expands mandate of the United Nations Assistance Mission for Rwanda
966	8 December 1994	15–0–0	Extends mandate of the United Nations Angola Verification Mission II, monitoring of ceasefire
967	14 December 1994	15–0–0	Permits export of diphtheria antiserum from the Federal Republic of Yugoslavia (Serbia and Montenegro) for 30 days
968	16 December 1994	15–0–0	Establishes the United Nations Mission of Observers in Tajikistan, national reconciliation after civil war
969	21 December 1994	15–0–0	Extends mandate of the United Nations Peacekeeping Force in Cyprus, implementation of confidence-building measures
970	12 January 1995	14–0–1 (abstention: Russia)	Closure of border between Federal Republic of Yugoslavia (Serbia and Montenegro) and Bosnia and Herzegovina, excluding humanitarian aid
971	12 January 1995	15–0–0	Extends mandate of the United Nations Observer Mission in Georgia
972	13 January 1995	15–0–0	Extends mandate of the United Nations Observer Mission in Liberia, peace process
973	13 January 1995	15–0–0	Referendum in Western Sahara, extends mandate of the United Nations Mission for the Referendum in Western Sahara
974	30 January 1995	15–0–0	Extends mandate of the United Nations Interim Force in Lebanon
975	30 January 1995	14–0–1 (abstention: China)	Extends mandate of the United Nations Mission in Haiti, transfer of responsibility from the multinational force
976	8 February 1995	15–0–0	Establishes the United Nations Angola Verification Mission III
977	22 February 1995	15–0–0	Designation of Arusha as seat of the International Criminal Tribunal for Rwanda
978	27 February 1995	15–0–0	Arrest and detention of responsible for acts within the jurisdiction of the International Criminal Tribunal for Rwanda
979	9 March 1995	Adopted without vote	Vacancy and election at the International Court of Justice
980	22 March 1995	Adopted without vote	Vacancy and election at the International Court of Justice
981	31 March 1995	15–0–0	Establishes the United Nations Confidence Restoration Operation in Croatia
982	31 March 1995	15–0–0	Extends the mandate of the United Nations Protection Force, operations in Croatia
983	31 March 1995	15–0–0	Establishes the United Nations Preventive Deployment Force in the Republic of Macedonia
984	11 April 1995	15–0–0	Security assurances against the use of nuclear weapons to non-nuclear-weapon states that are parties to the Treaty on the Non-Proliferation of Nuclear Weapons
985	13 April 1995	15–0–0	Extends mandate of the United Nations Observer Mission in Liberia, establishes Committee on arms embargo against Liberia
986	14 April 1995	15–0–0	Authorises temporary importation of petroleum and related products to Iraq for humanitarian reasons, establishes the Oil-for-Food Programme
987	19 April 1995	15–0–0	Security and safety of the United Nations Protection Force
988	21 April 1995	13–0–2 (abstentions: China, Russia)	Extends partial suspension of certain sanctions against Yugoslavia
989	24 April 1995	15–0–0	List of candidates for nominated for judges at the International Criminal Tribunal for Rwanda
990	28 April 1995	15–0–0	Authorises deployment of the United Nations Confidence Restoration Operation in Croatia
991	28 April 1995	15–0–0	Terminates the United Nations Observer Mission in El Salvador
992	11 May 1995	15–0–0	Freedom of navigation in the River Danube
993	12 May 1995	15–0–0	Extends mandate of the United Nations Observer Mission in Georgia, political settlement of conflict between Abkhazia, Georgia
994	17 May 1995	15–0–0	Withdrawal of the Croatian troops from the zone of separation, full deployment of the United Nations Confidence Restoration Operation in Croatia
995	26 May 1995	15–0–0	Extends mandate of the United Nations Mission for the Referendum in Western Sahara, dispatch of mission of the Security Council to the region, Settlement Plan
996	30 May 1995	15–0–0	Extends mandate of the United Nations Disengagement Observer Force
997	9 June 1995	15–0–0	Extends and adjusts the United Nations Assistance Mission for Rwanda, reconciliation and rehabilitation process
998	16 June 1995	13–0–2 (abstentions: China, Russia)	Establishes rapid-reaction force within the United Nations Protection Force
999	16 June 1995	15–0–0	Extends mandate of the United Nations Mission of Observers in Tajikistan, national reconciliation
1000	23 June 1995	15–0–0	Extends mandate of the United Nations Peacekeeping Force in Cyprus, confidence-building measures

== See also ==
- Lists of United Nations Security Council resolutions
- List of United Nations Security Council Resolutions 801 to 900
- List of United Nations Security Council Resolutions 1001 to 1100
