= United Nations Security Council Resolution 928 =

UN Security Council Resolution 928
- UNOMUR medal bar
- Date: 20 June 1994
- Meeting no.: 3,391
- Code: S/RES/928 (Document)
- Subject: Rwanda
- Voting summary: 15 voted for; None voted against; None abstained
- Result: Adopted

Security Council composition
- Permanent members: China; France; Russia; United Kingdom; United States
- Non-permanent members: Argentina; Brazil; Czech Republic; Djibouti; New Zealand; Nigeria; Oman; Pakistan; Rwanda; Spain

United Nations Security Council resolution 928, adopted unanimously on 20 June 1994, after reaffirming resolutions 812 (1993), 846 (1993) and 891 (1993) on the situation in Rwanda, the Council stressed the need to continue to implement the arms embargo on the country imposed in Resolution 918 (1994) and extended the mandate of the United Nations Observer Mission Uganda–Rwanda (UNOMUR) for a final period of three months until 21 September 1994.

The Council agreed that UNOMUR's withdrawal should take place in phases, requesting the Secretary-General Boutros Boutros-Ghali report on the termination of UNOMUR before it completed its mandate. Appreciation was expressed towards the Government of Uganda for its co-operation with UNOMUR, stressing the continued importance of the co-operation.

The resolution also stressed that the issue of arms flows in the region was of major concern.

== See also ==
- History of Rwanda
- List of United Nations Security Council Resolutions 901 to 1000 (1994–1995)
- Rwandan Civil War
- Rwandan genocide
- United Nations Assistance Mission for Rwanda
