= United Nations Security Council Resolution 916 =

UN Security Council Resolution 916
- ONUMOZ medal bar
- Date: 5 May 1994
- Meeting no.: 3,375
- Code: S/RES/916 (Document)
- Subject: Mozambique
- Voting summary: 15 voted for; None voted against; None abstained
- Result: Adopted

Security Council composition
- Permanent members: China; France; Russia; United Kingdom; United States
- Non-permanent members: Argentina; Brazil; Czech Republic; Djibouti; New Zealand; Nigeria; Oman; Pakistan; Rwanda; Spain

United Nations Security Council resolution 916, adopted unanimously on 5 May 1994, after reaffirming Resolution 782 (1992) and all subsequent resolutions on Mozambique, the council decided to renew the mandate of the United Nations Operation in Mozambique (ONUMOZ) for a final period ending 15 November 1994, and discussed the implementation of the Rome General Peace Accords.

The security council recalled the importance of the General Peace Agreement (Rome General Peace Accords) for Mozambique and its timely implementation. Progress was welcomed in the country, particularly the announcement that elections would take place on 27 and 28 October, but concern was also expressed at the delay in implementing some parts of the agreements.

The council welcomed the observance of the ceasefire, the beginning of demobilisation, transfer of arms to regional depots, the arrival of the high command and the beginning of training for the new army. The deployment of United Nations police observers was welcomed and all parties were called upon to cooperate with them, and allow ONUMOZ and the police unfettered access to the areas under their control, and to permit free political activity.

The announcement of election dates and establishment of an election commission and its provincial offices was welcomed by the council. Concern was expressed at delays in the implementation of parts of the Accords with regard to demobilisation and the formation of the Mozambican Defense Forces. The President of Mozambique and RENAMO had agreed to accelerate the process. On 1 June, the forces were to be assembled and on 15 July the process of the demobilisation was to be completed. In this regard, the council underlined the need for ONUMOZ to be fully informed of the process, have access to military bases and ensure that as many troops were trained before the elections as possible. Demining was also important for the council, which welcomed the Secretary-General Boutros Boutros-Ghali's intention to accelerate the process.

There was also an appeal to the international community in the resolution, calling for financial, technical and humanitarian assistance, while the resettling of refugees and displaced persons was praised. After extending ONUMOZ's mandate, it noted it would be reviewed by 15 July 1994, based on a report by the secretary-general.

== See also ==
- Elections in Mozambique
- History of Mozambique
- List of United Nations Security Council Resolutions 901 to 1000 (1994–1995)
