= United Nations Security Council Resolution 977 =

UN Security Council Resolution 977
- Arusha Region of Tanzania
- Date: 22 February 1995
- Meeting no.: 3,502
- Code: S/RES/977 (Document)
- Subject: Rwanda
- Voting summary: 15 voted for; None voted against; None abstained
- Result: Adopted

Security Council composition
- Permanent members: China; France; Russia; United Kingdom; United States
- Non-permanent members: Argentina; Botswana; Czech Republic; Germany; Honduras; Indonesia; Italy; Nigeria; Oman; Rwanda

United Nations Security Council resolution 977, adopted unanimously on 22 February 1995, after recalling Resolution 955 (1994) in which the council was to determine the seat of the International Criminal Tribunal for Rwanda (ICTR) and noting a report by the Secretary-General Boutros Boutros-Ghali, the council decided that its seat would be in Arusha, Tanzania.

According to the Secretary-General's report, the decision signalled the second phase of the process in establishing the ICTR, which would now allow the process of selecting the six trial judges to begin. Rwanda's representative to the council Manzi Bakuramutsa said that, while his government did not support the decision to allocate the seat outside Rwanda, it would still co-operate with the security council.

== See also ==
- List of United Nations Security Council Resolutions 901 to 1000 (1994–1995)
- Rwandan Civil War
- Rwandan genocide
- United Nations Observer Mission Uganda–Rwanda
