= United Nations Security Council Resolution 999 =

UN Security Council Resolution 999
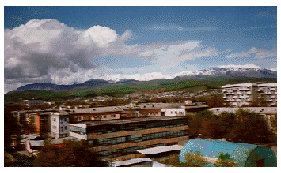
- Dushanbe, capital of Tajikistan
- Date: 16 June 1995
- Meeting no.: 3,544
- Code: S/RES/999 (Document)
- Subject: Tajikistan
- Voting summary: 15 voted for; None voted against; None abstained
- Result: Adopted

Security Council composition
- Permanent members: China; France; Russia; United Kingdom; United States
- Non-permanent members: Argentina; Botswana; Czech Republic; Germany; Honduras; Indonesia; Italy; Nigeria; Oman; Rwanda

United Nations Security Council resolution 999, adopted unanimously on 16 June 1995, after recalling Resolution 968 (1994) on the situation in Tajikistan, the Council extended the mandate of the United Nations Mission of Observers in Tajikistan (UNMOT) until 15 December 1995 and addressed the process of national reconciliation in the country.

Talks between the government and the United Tajik Opposition in Tajikistan were positive and a ceasefire had been agreed for another 3 months until 26 August 1995. Both sides wanted to resolve the conflict peacefully and to reach national reconciliation based on mutual concessions and compromises. It was noted that the Commonwealth of Independent States (CIS) peacekeeping force in the country had its mandate extended until 31 December 1995. Both parties, the peacekeeping forces and the Organization for Security and Co-operation in Europe mission were in close contact with each other.

UNMOT's mandate was extended to 15 December 1995 on condition that the agreement and the ceasefire remained in place and the parties continued to work towards reconciliation and democracy. Every three months, the Secretary-General Boutros Boutros-Ghali was requested to submit reports to the council on the situation. The parties were urged to build confidence by exchanging prisoner of war and permitting the voluntary return of refugees.

The council stressed the urgency of a cessation of hostilities on the Tajik-Afghan border, calling on all countries to discourage activities that could hamper the peace process in Tajikistan. In this regard, the Secretary-General was required to report on discussions with the authorities in Afghanistan regarding a proposed deployment of United Nations personnel in northern Afghanistan. Contributions and humanitarian aid from some countries was welcomed further assistance was requested.

== See also ==
- Civil war in Tajikistan
- History of Tajikistan
- List of United Nations Security Council Resolutions 901 to 1000 (1994–1995)
