= United Nations Security Council Resolution 942 =

UN Security Council Resolution 942
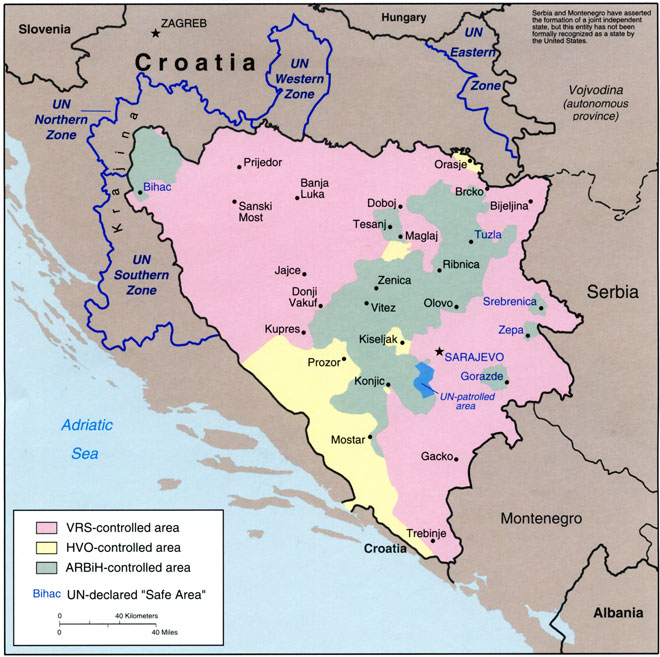
- Areas of control in Bosnia and Herzegovina (September 1994)
- Date: 23 September 1994
- Meeting no.: 3,428
- Code: S/RES/942 (Document)
- Subject: Bosnia and Herzegovina
- Voting summary: 14 voted for; None voted against; 1 abstained
- Result: Adopted

Security Council composition
- Permanent members: China; France; Russia; United Kingdom; United States
- Non-permanent members: Argentina; Brazil; Czech Republic; Djibouti; New Zealand; Nigeria; Oman; Pakistan; Rwanda; Spain

United Nations Security Council resolution 942, adopted on 23 September 1994, after reaffirming all resolutions on the situation in Bosnia and Herzegovina, the Council reinforced measures relating to safe areas under control of Bosnian Serb forces.

The security council wanted the conflict in the former Yugoslavia resolve through negotiation and while preserving the territorial integrity of countries in the region. The Bosnian Serb party had refused to accept a proposed territorial settlement and this was condemned. It was stated that all measures adopted in this and previous resolutions had been imposed to contribute to a negotiated solution.

Acting under Chapter VII of the United Nations Charter, the Council expressed approval for the territorial settlement and that it was accepted by all parties except the Bosnian Serb party, which was condemned. All parties were required to observe the ceasefire agreed on 8 July 1994 and cease hostilities.

Security measures in areas under control of the Bosnian Serb party were strengthened. It was decided that all states were to refrain from political talks with the party until it had accepted the proposals. Additionally, all states were instructed to:

(a) prohibit economic activities owned or controlled by the Bosnian Serb forces in their territory, excluding the provision of humanitarian assistance and foodstuffs notified to the Committee established in Resolution 724 (1992);
(b) freeze funds of Bosnian Serb forces;
(c) prevent the provision of services excluding telecommunications, postal, legal or services authorised by the Government of Bosnia and Herzegovina;
(d) impose travel bans on Bosnian Serb officials and those acting on the behalf of such authorities;
(e) ban river traffic from entering ports under control by Bosnian Serb forces, unless authorised on a case-by-case basis;
(f) prevent the diversion of benefits from areas under Bosnian Serb control to other areas, including the United Nations Protected Areas in Croatia.

The provisions would not apply to the United Nations Protection Force (UNPROFOR), International Conference on the Former Yugoslavia or European Community Monitoring Mission, and would be reviewed every four months and in the case of an acceptance of the proposals by the Bosnian Serb party. Finally, the Secretary-General Boutros Boutros-Ghali was instructed to provide assistance to the committee.

Resolution 942 was adopted by 14 votes to none, with one abstention from China.

== See also ==
- Bosnian Genocide
- Bosnian War
- Breakup of Yugoslavia
- Croatian War of Independence
- List of United Nations Security Council Resolutions 901 to 1000 (1994–1995)
- Yugoslav Wars
