= United Nations Security Council Resolution 932 =

UN Security Council Resolution 932
- UNAVEM medal ribbon
- Date: 30 June 1994
- Meeting no.: 3,395
- Code: S/RES/932 (Document)
- Subject: Angola
- Voting summary: 15 voted for; None voted against; None abstained
- Result: Adopted

Security Council composition
- Permanent members: China; France; Russia; United Kingdom; United States
- Non-permanent members: Argentina; Brazil; Czech Republic; Djibouti; New Zealand; Nigeria; Oman; Pakistan; Rwanda; Spain

United Nations Security Council resolution 932, adopted unanimously on 30 June 1994, after reaffirming Resolution 696 (1991) and all subsequent resolutions on Angola, the council discussed the situation during the civil war and extended the mandate of the United Nations Angola Verification Mission II (UNAVEM II) until 30 September 1994.

UNITA was urged to accept the results of the legislative and presidential elections and respect peace agreements. Both parties, especially UNITA, had to be flexible and act in good faith towards the negotiations in Lusaka, Zambia. Recently, the military operations in Angola had again intensified, which had consequences for the population, hindered the talks in Lusaka and affected UNAVEM II's ability to carry out its mandate.

After extending the mandate of UNAVEM II until 30 September 1994, the security council urged both parties to fulfill their commitments, working towards a ceasefire and a peaceful solution. The Government of Angola had accepted proposals for national reconciliation by Margaret Anstee, and UNITA was urged to do the same. If, by 31 July 1994, the proposals were not accepted, then additional measures would be imposed against UNITA, as indicated in Resolution 864 (1993). Furthermore, the role of the United Nations in Angola would be reconsidered at the end of UNAVEM II's newly extended mandate if no peace agreement was reached. All countries were reminded of their obligation to implement the sanctions against UNITA. Two neighbours of Angola who had so far failed to co-operate were asked to submit information regarding alleged violations of the sanctions.

The council condemned the intensification of offensive military actions throughout the country, contrary to Resolution 922 (1994), and in this regard, both parties were urged to cease hostilities. The deteriorating humanitarian situation and actions against humanitarian aid workers were deplored and condemned. Both parties were urged to guarantee safe passage for humanitarian workers. Finally, the Secretary-General Boutros Boutros-Ghali was requested to report back to the council by 31 July 1994, on developments the situation.

== See also ==
- Angolan Civil War
- List of United Nations Security Council Resolutions 901 to 1000 (1994–1995)
- Lusaka Protocol
- United Nations Angola Verification Mission III
