= United Nations Security Council Resolution 958 =

UN Security Council Resolution 958
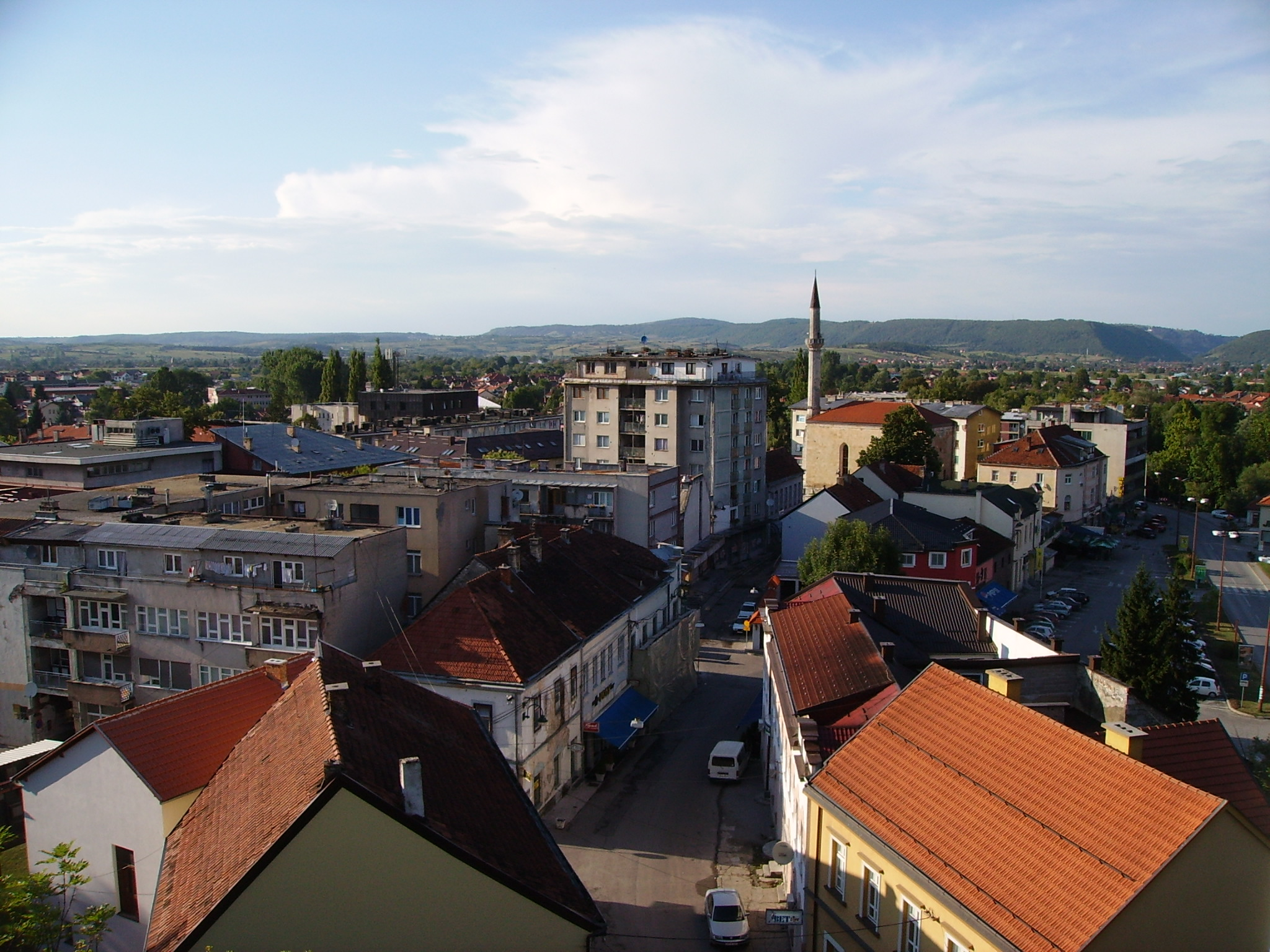
- Bihać
- Date: 19 November 1994
- Meeting no.: 3,461
- Code: S/RES/958 (Document)
- Subject: Former Yugoslavia
- Voting summary: 15 voted for; None voted against; None abstained
- Result: Adopted

Security Council composition
- Permanent members: China; France; Russia; United Kingdom; United States
- Non-permanent members: Argentina; Brazil; Czech Republic; Djibouti; New Zealand; Nigeria; Oman; Pakistan; Rwanda; Spain

United Nations Security Council resolution 958, adopted unanimously on 19 November 1994, after recalling all resolutions on the situation in the former Yugoslavia including Resolution 836 (1993), the council, acting under Chapter VII of the United Nations Charter, determined that the situation in the former Yugoslavia continued to constitute a threat to international peace and security and in its support of the United Nations Protection Force (UNPROFOR), authorised the use of air strikes in Croatia in addition to Bosnia and Herzegovina by member states, in order for UNPROFOR to carry out its mandate. UNPROFOR was authorised to use air force independently, via direct member states support or via regional organizations. Subsequent air force interventions in Udbina airfield and other locations in Croatia and Bosnia, were conducted with NATO support.

== See also ==
- Bosnian War
- Breakup of Yugoslavia
- Croatian War of Independence
- List of United Nations Security Council Resolutions 901 to 1000 (1994–1995)
- Yugoslav Wars
- Airstrike on Udbina Air Base
- List of United Nations Security Council Resolutions related to the conflicts in former Yugoslavia
