= United Nations Security Council Resolution 902 =

UN Security Council Resolution 902
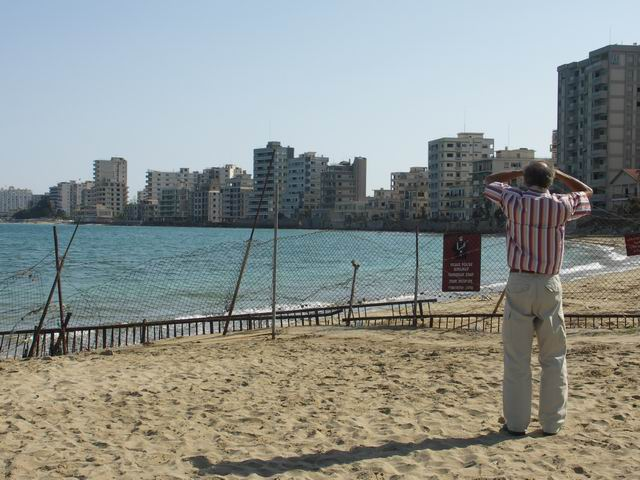
- Varosha coastline
- Date: 11 March 1994
- Meeting no.: 3,347
- Code: S/RES/902 (Document)
- Subject: Cyprus
- Voting summary: 15 voted for; None voted against; None abstained
- Result: Adopted

Security Council composition
- Permanent members: China; France; Russia; United Kingdom; United States
- Non-permanent members: Argentina; Brazil; Czech Republic; Djibouti; New Zealand; Nigeria; Oman; Pakistan; Rwanda; Spain

United Nations Security Council resolution 902, adopted unanimously on 11 March 1994, after receiving a report from the Secretary-General Boutros Boutros-Ghali pursuant to Resolution 880 (1993), the council discussed confidence-building measures between the Republic of Cyprus and Northern Cyprus with the aim of resolving the Cyprus dispute.

The council offered its support to the secretary-general for his efforts in achieving an agreement on the confidence-building measures relating to Varosha and Nicosia International Airport, reaffirming that, while they are not an end in themselves, would offer significant benefits to both communities on the island and facilitate the political process towards an overall settlement. The status quo was unacceptable for the council, which welcomed the agreements in principle by both parties to the confidence-building measures. Intensive discussions had made it possible for the secretary-general's representatives to bring forward ideas that would facilitate the discussions aimed at reaching agreement on the key issues for implementing the confidence-building measures.

Finally, the secretary-general was requested to submit a further report by the end of March 1994 concerning the outcome of his efforts to conclude an agreement.

== See also ==
- Cyprus dispute
- List of United Nations Security Council Resolutions 901 to 1000 (1994–1995)
- United Nations Buffer Zone in Cyprus
- Turkish Invasion of Cyprus
