= United Nations Security Council Resolution 951 =

UN Security Council Resolution 951
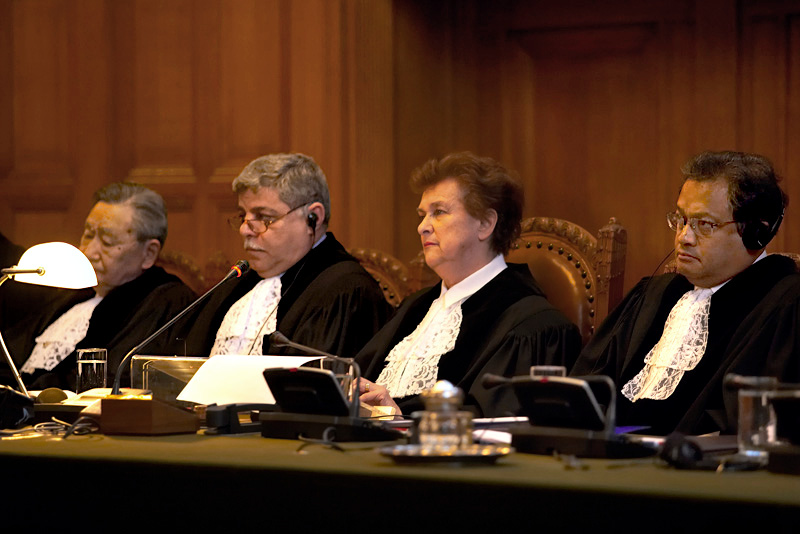
- Judges at the ICJ
- Date: 21 October 1994
- Meeting no.: 3,443
- Code: S/RES/951 (Document)
- Subject: International Court of Justice
- Result: Adopted

Security Council composition
- Permanent members: China; France; Russia; United Kingdom; United States
- Non-permanent members: Argentina; Brazil; Czech Republic; Djibouti; New Zealand; Nigeria; Oman; Pakistan; Rwanda; Spain

United Nations Security Council resolution 951, adopted without a vote on 21 October 1994, after noting the death of International Court of Justice (ICJ) judge Nikolai Konstantinovitch Tarassov on 28 September 1994, the Council decided that elections to the vacancy on the ICJ would take place on 26 January 1995 at the Security Council and at a meeting of the General Assembly during its 49th session.

Tarassov, a Russian diplomat, was a member of the court since 1985. His term of office was due to expire in February 1997.

== See also ==
- Judges of the International Court of Justice
- List of United Nations Security Council Resolutions 901 to 1000 (1994–1995)
