= United Nations Security Council Resolution 923 =

UN Security Council Resolution 923
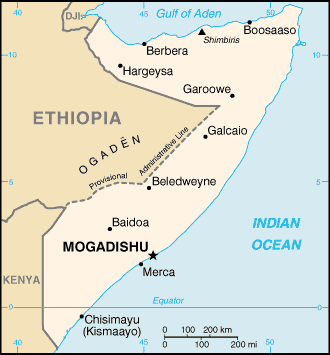
- Somalia
- Date: 31 May 1994
- Meeting no.: 3,385
- Code: S/RES/923 (Document)
- Subject: Somalia
- Voting summary: 15 voted for; None voted against; None abstained
- Result: Adopted

Security Council composition
- Permanent members: China; France; Russia; United Kingdom; United States
- Non-permanent members: Argentina; Brazil; Czech Republic; Djibouti; New Zealand; Nigeria; Oman; Pakistan; Rwanda; Spain

United Nations Security Council resolution 923 was adopted unanimously on 31 May 1994. After reaffirming Resolution 733 (1992) and all of its subsequent resolutions on the situation in Somalia, the council addressed measures to resolve the situation and extended the mandate of the United Nations Operation in Somalia II (UNOSOM II) until 30 September 1994.

The Somali parties and factions were urged to work towards reconciliation and to abide by the agreements and commitments they entered into, and a statement the parties released to that effect was welcomed. The declaration would also establish procedures for the reconciliation conference, elect a president, vice-president and prime minister, and complete and review the formation of an independent legal system.

There was concern at the delays in the reconciliation process and the deteriorating security situation in Somalia. Fighting, banditry, violence and armed attacks on humanitarian aid workers were condemned. The safety of workers and United Nations personnel was important, with tributes paid to those who had lost their lives in Somalia from several countries. The council also took note that the Somali leaders had asked for the continued support of UNOSOM II during the reconciliation and rehabilitation efforts, while the UNOSOM II was expected to be complete by March 1995.

Acting under Chapter VII of the United Nations Charter, the council extended the mandate of UNOSOM II until 30 September 1994 on the subject of a review submitted by the Secretary-General Boutros Boutros-Ghali no later than 29 July 1994 concerning the humanitarian, political and security situation in Somalia and its future. All parties had to cooperate with UNOSOM II and their obligations, including those on voluntary disarmament, and immediately negotiate further.

The council demanded that violence and intimidation against humanitarian workers end, and reaffirmed that the arms embargo placed on Somalia was compulsory. The progress in establishing the justice and police programmes by UNOSOM II was welcomed, along with member states which provided assistance in this manner. Finally, the continuing importance of UNOSOM II having the necessary troops, civilian personnel, equipment, financial and logistic support to carry out its mandate was stressed.

== See also ==
- History of Somalia
- List of United Nations Security Council Resolutions 901 to 1000 (1994–1995)
- Somali Civil War
