= United Nations Security Council Resolution 974 =

UN Security Council Resolution 974
- UNIFIL ribbon
- Date: 30 January 1995
- Meeting no.: 3,495
- Code: S/RES/974 (Document)
- Subject: Israel–Hezbollah-Lebanon
- Voting summary: 15 voted for; None voted against; None abstained
- Result: Adopted

Security Council composition
- Permanent members: China; France; Russia; United Kingdom; United States
- Non-permanent members: Argentina; Botswana; Czech Republic; Germany; Honduras; Indonesia; Italy; Nigeria; Oman; Rwanda

United Nations Security Council resolution 974, adopted unanimously on 30 January 1995, after recalling previous resolutions on Israel and Lebanon including 501 (1982), 508 (1982), 509 (1982) and 520 (1982) as well as studying the report by the Secretary-General Boutros Boutros-Ghali on the United Nations Interim Force in Lebanon (UNIFIL) approved in 426 (1978), the Council decided to extend the mandate of UNIFIL for a further six months until 31 July 1995.

The Council then reemphasised the mandate of the Force and requested the Secretary-General Boutros Boutros-Ghali to continue negotiations with the Government of Lebanon and other parties concerned with regard to the implementation of resolutions 425 (1978) and 426 (1978) and report thereon. His intention to achieve economies in the maintenance and logistical support areas was welcomed.

== See also ==
- List of United Nations Security Council Resolutions 901 to 1000 (1994–1995)
- South Lebanon conflict (1985–2000)
