= United Nations Security Council Resolution 967 =

UN Security Council Resolution 967
- Date: 14 December 1994
- Meeting no.: 3,480
- Code: S/RES/967 (Document)
- Subject: Federal Republic of Yugoslavia (Serbia and Montenegro)
- Voting summary: 15 voted for; None voted against; None abstained
- Result: Adopted

Security Council composition
- Permanent members: China; France; Russia; United Kingdom; United States
- Non-permanent members: Argentina; Brazil; Czech Republic; Djibouti; New Zealand; Nigeria; Oman; Pakistan; Rwanda; Spain

United Nations Security Council resolution 967, adopted unanimously on 14 December 1994, after recalling all resolutions on the situation in the former Yugoslavia, in particular Resolution 757 (1992) and receiving letters from the chairman of the security council committee established in Resolution 727 (1992) and the United Nations Children's Fund which noted a resurgence in diphtheria and that the only available stocks of anti-serum to combat the condition were located in Serbia and Montenegro, the council, acting under Chapter VII of the United Nations Charter, authorised the export of 12,000 vials of diphtheria anti-serum from the country for a period of 30 days.

The export required exemption from international sanctions placed on the Federal Republic of Yugoslavia, and the council decided that any payments for the authorised shipments must only be made into frozen accounts.

== See also ==
- Bosnian War
- Breakup of Yugoslavia
- Croatian War of Independence
- List of United Nations Security Council Resolutions 901 to 1000 (1994–1995)
- Yugoslav Wars
- List of United Nations Security Council Resolutions related to the conflicts in former Yugoslavia
