= United Nations Security Council Resolution 992 =

UN Security Council Resolution 992
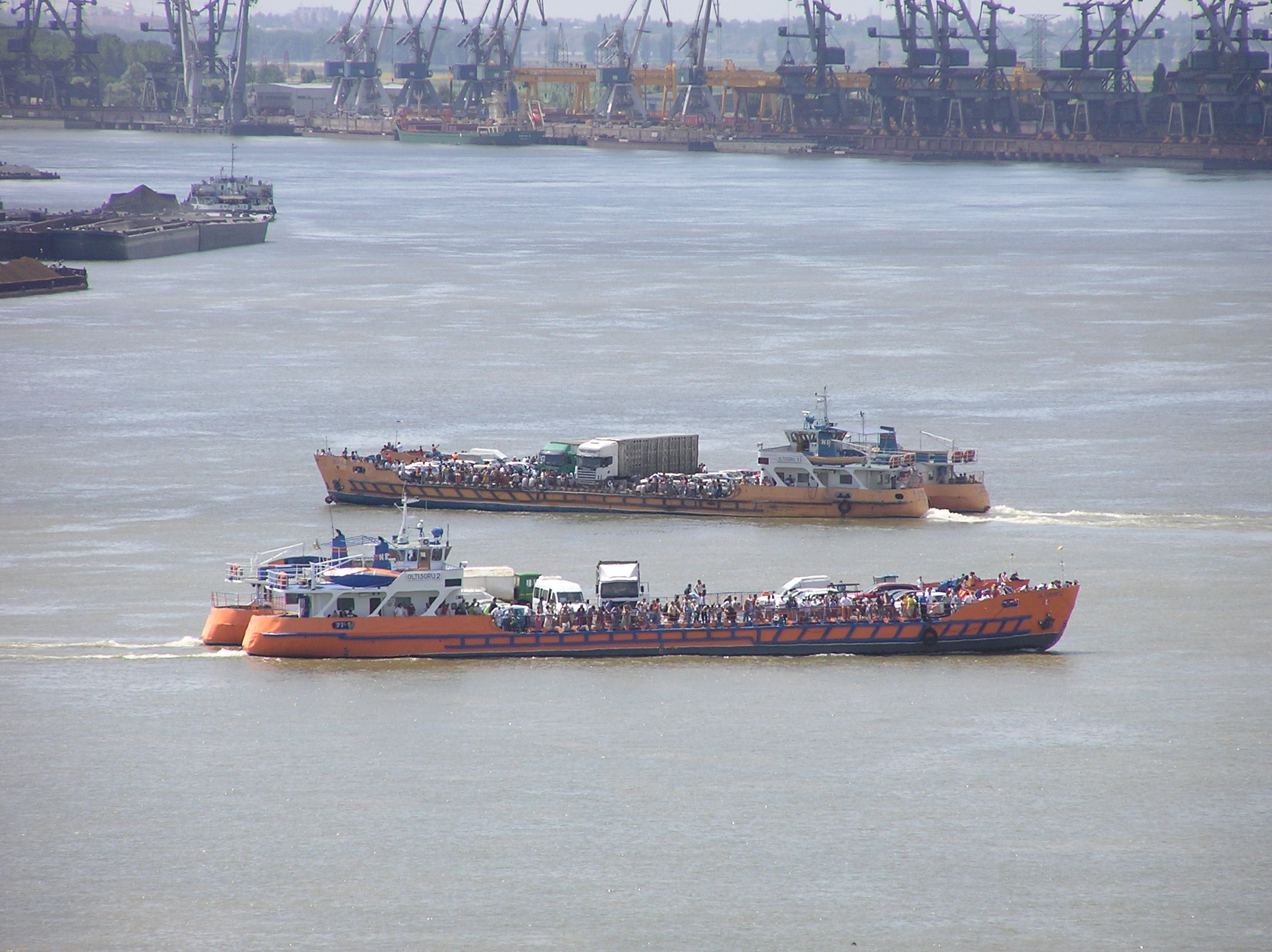
- Two ships on the Danube in Galați, eastern Romania
- Date: 11 May 1995
- Meeting no.: 3,533
- Code: S/RES/992 (Document)
- Subject: River Danube-former Yugoslavia
- Voting summary: 15 voted for; None voted against; None abstained
- Result: Adopted

Security Council composition
- Permanent members: China; France; Russia; United Kingdom; United States
- Non-permanent members: Argentina; Botswana; Czech Republic; Germany; Honduras; Indonesia; Italy; Nigeria; Oman; Rwanda

United Nations Security Council resolution 992, adopted unanimously on 11 May 1995, after reaffirming all resolutions on the situation in the former Yugoslavia, including 820 (1993), the Council addressed freedom of navigation in the Danube River.

The security council wished for unimpeded maritime access on the Danube. Concerns were raised regarding illegal tolls levied on foreign ships transiting the Danube in the territory of Serbia and Montenegro. States were reminded of their obligations in Resolution 757 (1992) not to make available funds to Serbia and Montenegro and that they may submit for reimbursement of tolls illegally imposed on their vessels. It was noted that ships owned or registered in Serbia and Montenegro were on the left hand side of the bank of the Danube while repairs were carried out to the right hand side of the bank. In this respect it was recognised that this would require exemption from the provisions in Resolution 820.

Acting under Chapter VII of the United Nations Charter, it was decided that the vessels from Serbia and Montenegro could use the Romanian locks on the left bank of the Danube. The current resolution would come into force once the committee established in Resolution 724 (1991) was satisfied that the lock repairs to Iron Gates I system on the right hand side of the bank were complete. The resolution would remain in force for an initial period of 60 days.

Romania was requested to monitor the use of the locks and if necessary inspect vessels and their cargo, to ensure that no goods are loaded or unloaded during the passage by the vessels through the locks of the Iron Gates I system. Any vessel in violation of Security Council resolutions could be denied access. The exemptions would be terminated on the third working day if violations were reported unless the Council decided to the contrary.

== See also ==
- Bosnian War
- Breakup of Yugoslavia
- Croatian War of Independence
- List of United Nations Security Council Resolutions 901 to 1000 (1994–1995)
- Yugoslav Wars
- List of United Nations Security Council Resolutions related to the conflicts in former Yugoslavia
