= United Nations Security Council Resolution 941 =

UN Security Council Resolution 941
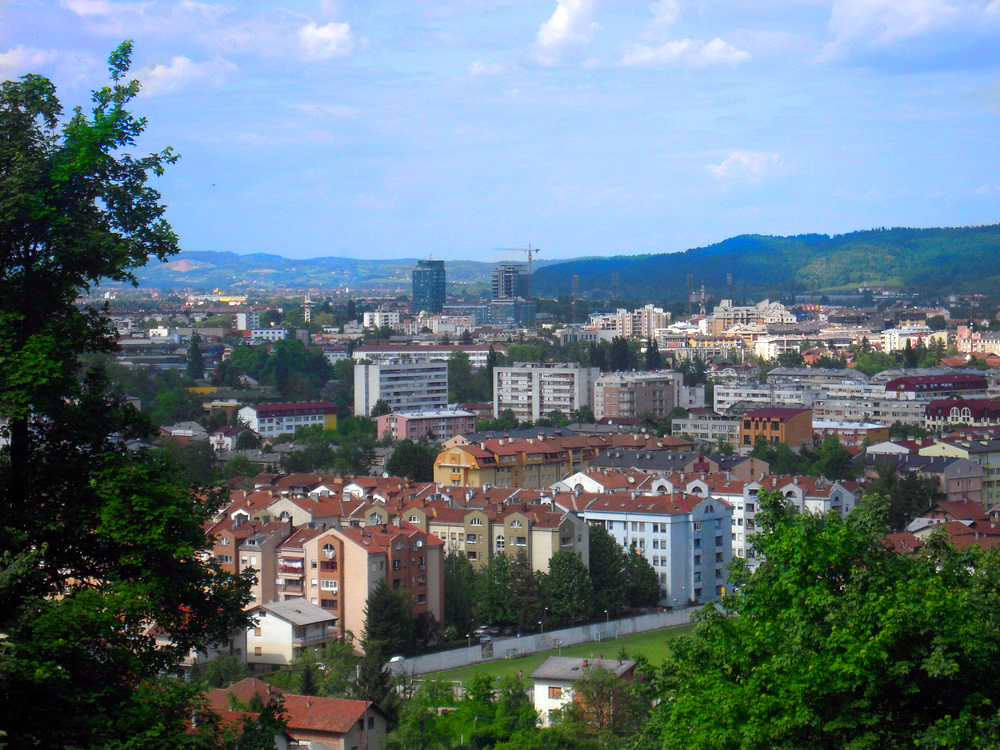
- Banja Luka
- Date: 23 September 1994
- Meeting no.: 3,428
- Code: S/RES/941 (Document)
- Subject: Bosnia and Herzegovina
- Voting summary: 15 voted for; None voted against; None abstained
- Result: Adopted

Security Council composition
- Permanent members: China; France; Russia; United Kingdom; United States
- Non-permanent members: Argentina; Brazil; Czech Republic; Djibouti; New Zealand; Nigeria; Oman; Pakistan; Rwanda; Spain

United Nations Security Council resolution 941, adopted unanimously on 23 September 1994, after reaffirming all resolutions on the situation in Bosnia and Herzegovina, the Council discussed violations of international humanitarian law in Banja Luka, Bijeljina and other areas of the country.

The security council had received information from the International Committee of the Red Cross and United Nations High Commissioner for Refugees about serious violations of international humanitarian law against the non-Serb population in areas in Bosnia and Herzegovina under Bosnian Serb control. It expressed concern at the "persistent and systematic campaign of terror" and ethnic cleansing perpetrated in Banja Luka, Bijeljina and other areas, as well as the Bosnian Serb refusal to allow the Special Representative of the Secretary-General and the United Nations Protection Force (UNPROFOR) into the areas. It was recognised that the International Criminal Tribunal for the former Yugoslavia (ICTY) had jurisdiction in this area and was determined to put an end to the ethnic cleansing.

Acting under Chapter VII of the United Nations Charter, the council reminded all parties in the conflict were bound by international humanitarian law and specifically the Geneva Conventions of 1949. All violations of these rights, and ethnic cleansing in particular, were strongly condemned. It also reaffirmed that all statements and actions made under duress, especially with regard to territory were null and void and that all displaced persons should be able to return to their homes.

The resolution demanded that the Bosnian Serbs immediately cease their campaign of ethnic cleansing and that they gave the United Nations access to the areas concerned. The Secretary-General Boutros Boutros-Ghali was urged to ensure that UNPROFOR was deployed to the areas of concern as soon as possible. He was further requested to report on the implementation of the current resolution as soon as possible.

== See also ==
- Bosnian Genocide
- Bosnian War
- Breakup of Yugoslavia
- Croatian War of Independence
- List of United Nations Security Council Resolutions 901 to 1000 (1994–1995)
- Yugoslav Wars
