= United Nations Security Council Resolution 945 =

UN Security Council Resolution 945
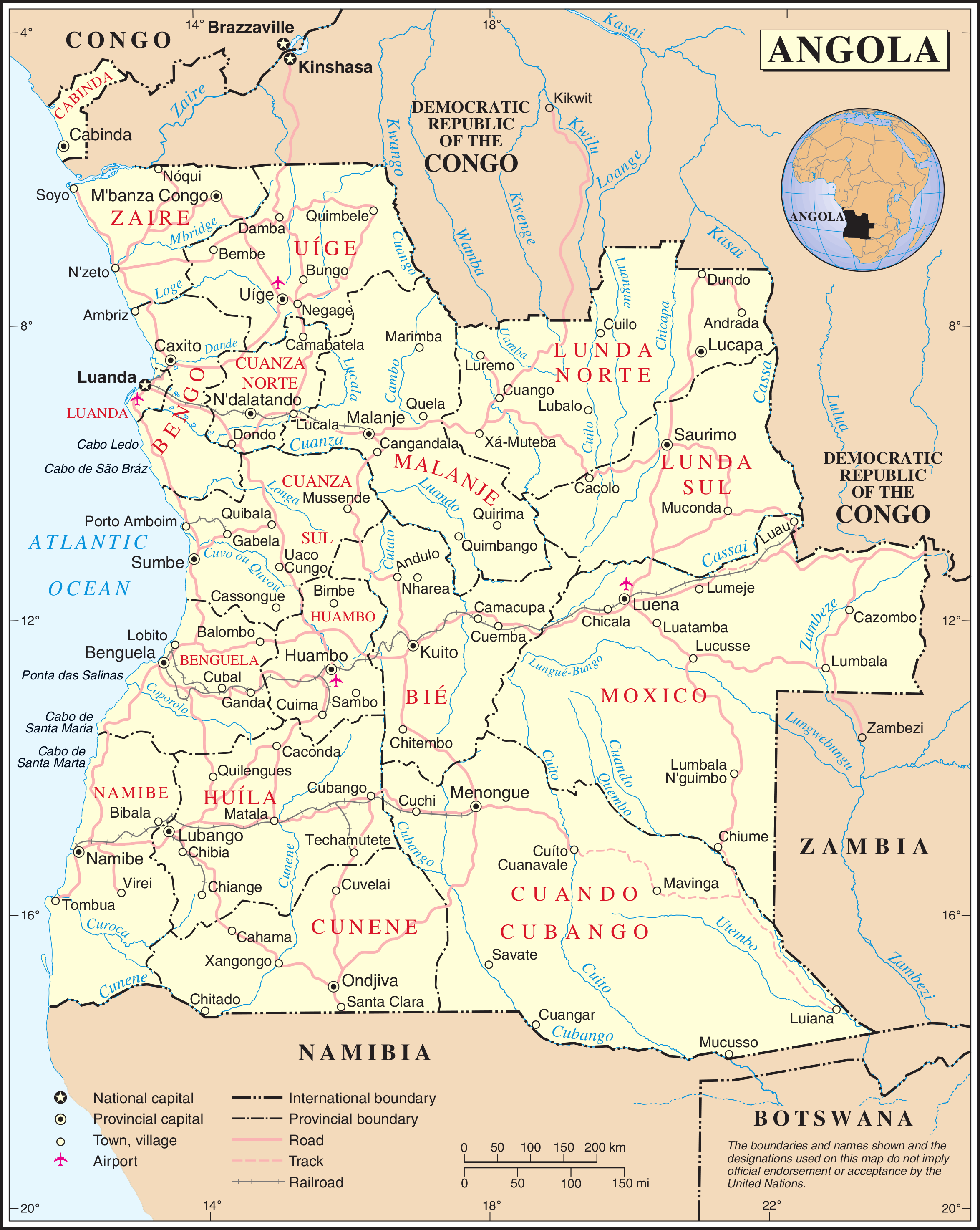
- Angola
- Date: 29 September 1994
- Meeting no.: 3,431
- Code: S/RES/945 (Document)
- Subject: The situation in Angola
- Voting summary: 15 voted for; None voted against; None abstained
- Result: Adopted

Security Council composition
- Permanent members: China; France; Russia; United Kingdom; United States
- Non-permanent members: Argentina; Brazil; Czech Republic; Djibouti; New Zealand; Nigeria; Oman; Pakistan; Rwanda; Spain

United Nations Security Council resolution 945, adopted unanimously on 29 September 1994, after reaffirming Resolution 696 (1991) and all subsequent resolutions on Angola, the Council extended the mandate of the United Nations Angola Verification Mission II (UNAVEM II) until 31 October 1994 and discussed the implementation of peace agreements.

The Council indicated that its future decisions on the role of the United Nations in Angola would depend on the will by the parties to achieve peace. There were still serious concerns about hostilities in the country which could affect the peace talks in Lusaka, Zambia, the implementation of UNAVEM II 's mandate and cause suffering to the civilian population. Concern was also expressed at violations of the arms embargo against UNITA in Resolution 864 (1993).

After extending the mandate of UNAVEM II until 31 October 1994, both parties were also urged to complete discussions in Lusaka and sign an agreement by the same date. Any further delays in the peace process were unacceptable. It was noted that UNITA had accepted proposals put forward by the special representative of the secretary-general and the three observer states and therefore no further action would be taken against the party. Should there be no agreement, the presence of the United Nations in Angola would be reviewed, and if there was an agreement, there would be an increase in strength in UNAVEM II to its previously authorised level. Meanwhile, military actions were urged to be halted immediately.

Actions that hindered the provision of humanitarian aid to the population, such as the laying of landmines, were condemned. The disappearance of humanitarian workers on 27 August 1994 caused concern and demands for their release were made. All states were reminded to implement the provisions of Resolution 864 against UNITA. Finally, the Secretary-General Boutros Boutros-Ghali was asked to report to the council on the military and humanitarian situation in Angola by 20 October 1994 and on the progress of the talks in Lusaka.

== See also ==
- Angolan Civil War
- List of United Nations Security Council Resolutions 901 to 1000 (1994–1995)
- Lusaka Protocol
- United Nations Angola Verification Mission III
