= United Nations Security Council Resolution 946 =

UN Security Council Resolution 946
- Date: 30 September 1994
- Meeting no.: 3,432
- Code: S/RES/946 (Document)
- Subject: Somalia
- Voting summary: 14 voted for; None voted against; 1 abstained
- Result: Adopted

Security Council composition
- Permanent members: China; France; Russia; United Kingdom; United States
- Non-permanent members: Argentina; Brazil; Czech Republic; Djibouti; New Zealand; Nigeria; Oman; Pakistan; Rwanda; Spain

United Nations Security Council resolution 946, adopted on 30 September 1994, after reaffirming Resolution 733 (1992) and all of its subsequent resolutions on the situation in Somalia, the council extended the mandate of the United Nations Operation in Somalia II (UNOSOM II) for a period of one month until 31 October 1994.

The council was concerned at the deteriorating situation in Somalia, attacks and harassment against UNOSOM II and other personnel were condemned, while it was the Somali parties responsibility to ensure the safety of the personnel. The presence of the United Nations and other international personnel and support in the country was dependent on the will of the Somali parties to achieve a political solution. The intention of the Secretary-General Boutros Boutros-Ghali to report on the prospects for national reconciliation and the future of the United Nations in Somalia by mid-October 1994.

The mandate of UNOSOM II was extended to 31 October 1994 and the council pledged to conduct a review of its mandate and future before the expiry date. The secretary-general was encouraged to prepare contingency arrangements for the implementation of decisions including the withdrawal of UNOSOM II. It was also decided to send a mission to Somalia to inform the parties there of the plans of the Security Council.

Resolution 946 was adopted by 14 votes to none, with one abstention from the United States.

== See also ==
- History of Somalia
- List of United Nations Security Council Resolutions 901 to 1000 (1994–1995)
- Somali Civil War
