= United Nations Security Council Resolution 970 =

UN Security Council Resolution 970
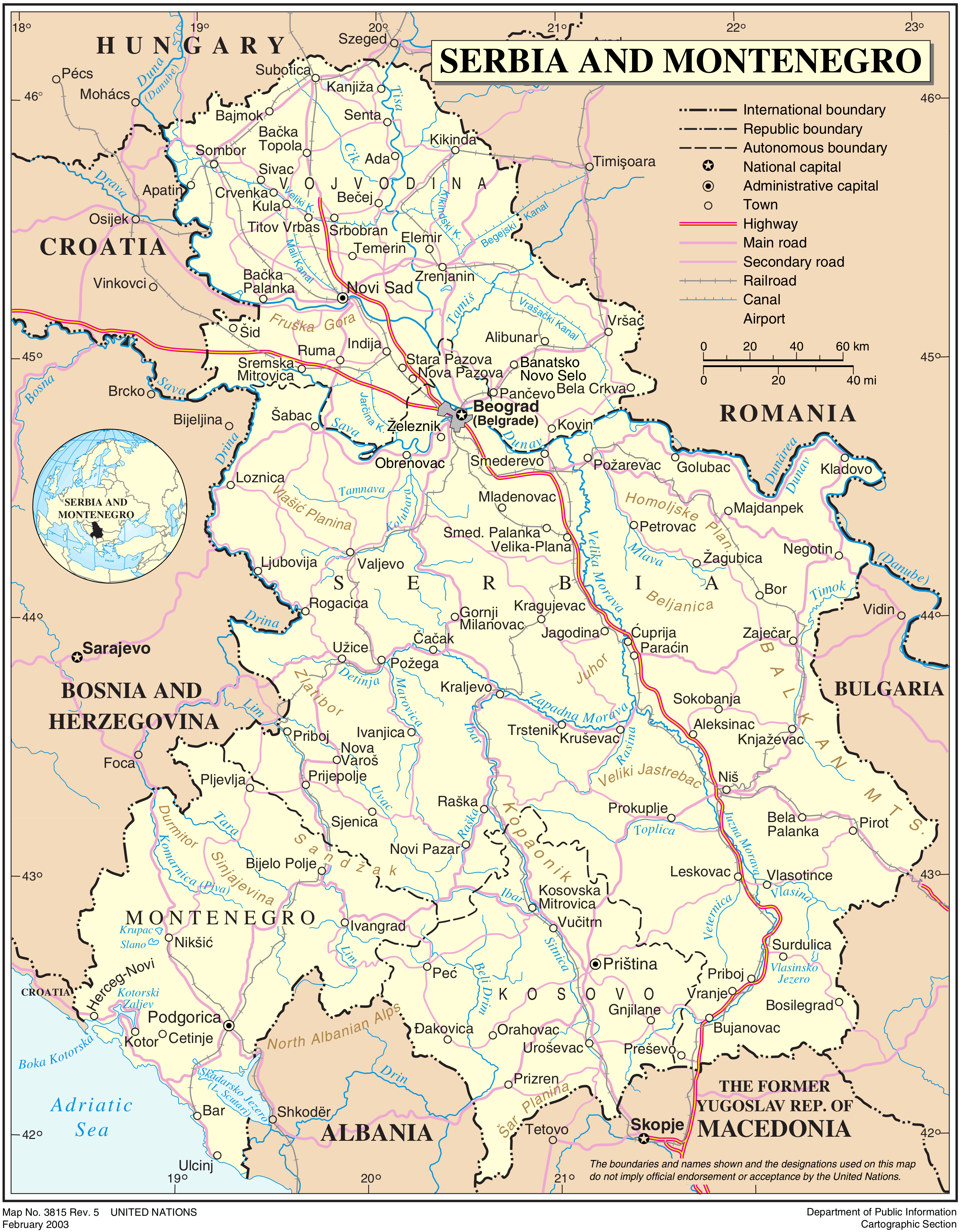
- Serbia and Montenegro
- Date: 12 January 1995
- Meeting no.: 3,487
- Code: S/RES/970 (Document)
- Subject: Former Yugoslavia
- Voting summary: 14 voted for; None voted against; 1 abstained
- Result: Adopted

Security Council composition
- Permanent members: China; France; Russia; United Kingdom; United States
- Non-permanent members: Argentina; Botswana; Czech Republic; Germany; Honduras; Indonesia; Italy; Nigeria; Oman; Rwanda

United Nations Security Council resolution 970, adopted on 12 January 1995, after reaffirming all resolutions on the situation in Bosnia and Herzegovina in particular Resolution 943 (1994) concerning the border closure between the Federal Republic of Yugoslavia (Serbia and Montenegro) and Bosnia and Herzegovina, the Council decided that measures in that resolution would be suspended for a further period of 100 days.

The Security Council welcomed the steps that Serbia and Montenegro took in maintaining the closure of its border with Bosnia and Herzegovina. It was important that the border remained closed, and that any violations of the closure were punished, noting that parts of Resolution 757 (1992) remained in force.

Requirements in Resolution 820 (1993) stating that import to, export from and transshipment through the United Nations Protected Areas in Croatia and areas of Bosnia and Herzegovina under the control of Bosnian Serb forces would have to be approved by the governments of both countries, except for humanitarian aid, were reaffirmed. The Committee of the Security Council established in Resolution 757 (1992) concerning requests for humanitarian assistance including from the International Committee of the Red Cross and United Nations High Commissioner for Refugees and other organisations was urged to adopt streamlined procedures.

The Secretary-General Boutros Boutros-Ghali was requested to report to the council every 30 days as to whether Serbia and Montenegro was effectively implementing the border closure, and that if not, the suspension of restrictions and other measures would be terminated within 5 working days. The Council concluded by stating it would keep the situation under review.

Russia abstained from the vote on Resolution 970, which was approved by the other 14 members of the council.

== See also ==
- Bosnian Genocide
- Bosnian War
- Breakup of Yugoslavia
- Croatian War of Independence
- List of United Nations Security Council Resolutions 901 to 1000 (1994–1995)
- Yugoslav Wars
- List of United Nations Security Council Resolutions related to the conflicts in former Yugoslavia
