= United Nations Security Council Resolution 960 =

UN Security Council Resolution 960
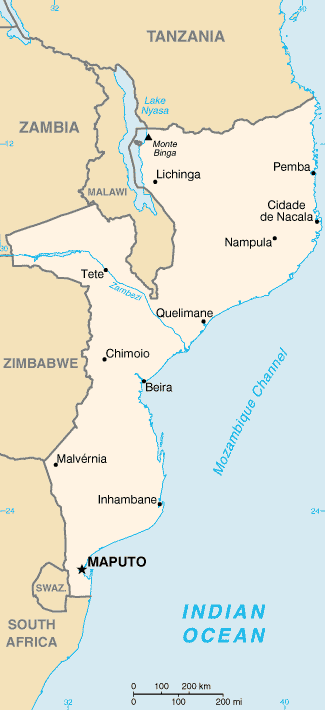
- Mozambique
- Date: 21 November 1994
- Meeting no.: 3,464
- Code: S/RES/960 (Document)
- Subject: Mozambique
- Voting summary: 15 voted for; None voted against; None abstained
- Result: Adopted

Security Council composition
- Permanent members: China; France; Russia; United Kingdom; United States
- Non-permanent members: Argentina; Brazil; Czech Republic; Djibouti; New Zealand; Nigeria; Oman; Pakistan; Rwanda; Spain

United Nations Security Council Resolution 960, adopted unanimously on 21 November 1994, after reaffirming Resolution 782 (1992) and all subsequent resolutions on Mozambique, the Council welcomed and endorsed the recent elections on 27–29 October 1994 in accordance with the Rome General Peace Accords, noting a declaration that they were free and fair by the Special Representative of the Secretary-General.

The Council called upon the Mozambican parties to accept the results, of which Joaquim Chissano of FRELIMO was elected, and to continue the process of national reconciliation on a system of multi-party democracy and observe democratic principles. All Member States and international organisations were urged to contribute to the reconstruction of Mozambique.

== See also ==
- Elections in Mozambique
- History of Mozambique
- List of United Nations Security Council Resolutions 901 to 1000 (1994–1995)
