= United Nations Security Council Resolution 982 =

UN Security Council Resolution 982
- UNPROFOR medal bar
- Date: 31 March 1995
- Meeting no.: 3,512
- Code: S/RES/982 (Document)
- Subject: Former Yugoslavia
- Voting summary: 15 voted for; None voted against; None abstained
- Result: Adopted

Security Council composition
- Permanent members: China; France; Russia; United Kingdom; United States
- Non-permanent members: Argentina; Botswana; Czech Republic; Germany; Honduras; Indonesia; Italy; Nigeria; Oman; Rwanda

United Nations Security Council resolution 982, adopted unanimously on 31 March 1995, after reaffirming all resolutions on the situation in the former Yugoslavia in particular Resolution 947 (1994) concerning the United Nations Protection Force (UNPROFOR), the Council extended the mandate of UNPROFOR for additional period terminating 30 November 1995 and discussed operations in Croatia.

The government of Bosnia and Herzegovina had accepted the contact group peace plan and the parties in the country were observing a ceasefire agreement. The council was encouraged by UNPROFOR's efforts to assist in the implementation of the Washington agreements. The importance of the city of Sarajevo as the capital of Bosnia and Herzegovina and as a multicultural, multiethnic, and religious centre was reiterated, and that the agreement on demilitarisation of the city would have a positive effect. Human rights had to be respected in order to build mutual trust and peace.

The mandate of UNPROFOR was extended until 30 November 1995 and the Secretary-General Boutros Boutros-Ghali was authorised to redeploy all UNPROFOR personnel and assets from Croatia into Bosnia and Herzegovina, except those required for the United Nations Confidence Restoration Operation in Croatia. UNPROFOR would continue to carry out the implementation of relevant agreements, facilitate the delivery of humanitarian aid to Bosnia and Herzegovina via Croatia and maintain its support structure in that country. Meanwhile, parties in both countries were urged to observe the ceasefire and negotiate a peaceful settlement.

Finally, the resolution concluded by requesting the Secretary-General to keep the Council informed on developments in the region.

== See also ==
- Bosnian War
- Breakup of Yugoslavia
- Croatian War of Independence
- List of United Nations Security Council Resolutions 901 to 1000 (1994–1995)
- Yugoslav Wars
- List of United Nations Security Council Resolutions related to the conflicts in former Yugoslavia
