= United Nations Security Council Resolution 922 =

UN Security Council Resolution 922
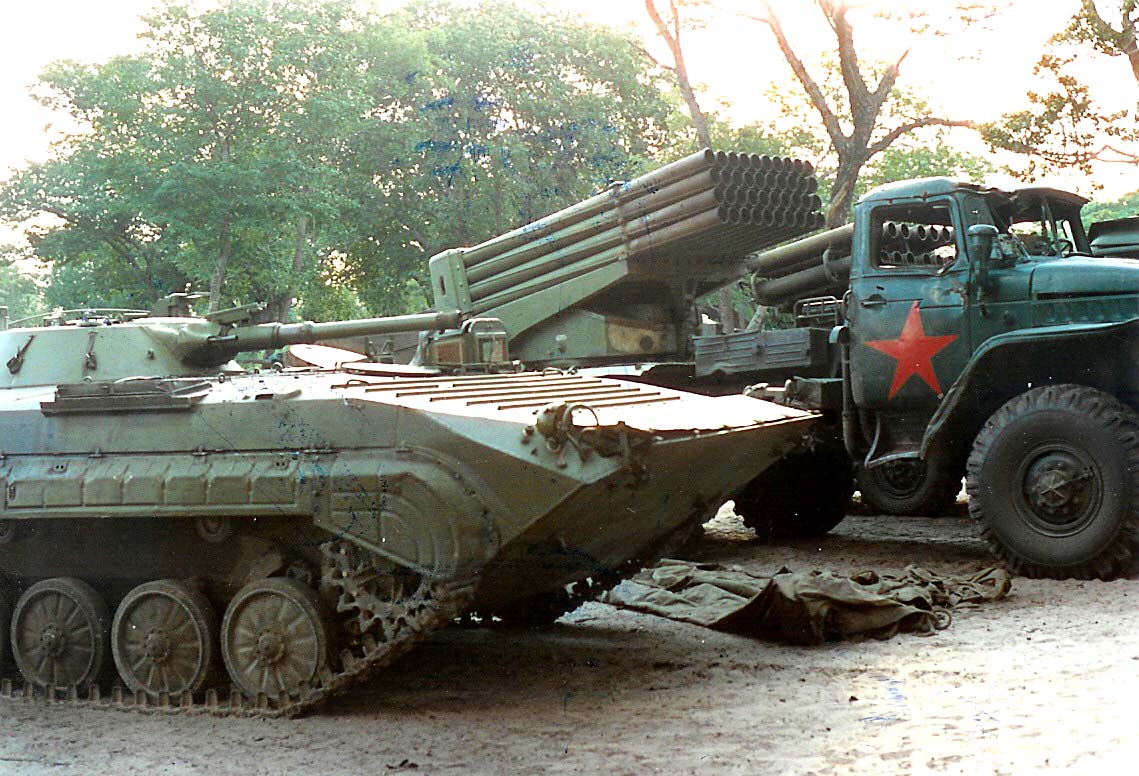
- Demobilized UNITA vehicles
- Date: 31 May 1994
- Meeting no.: 3,384
- Code: S/RES/922 (Document)
- Subject: The situation in Angola
- Voting summary: 15 voted for; None voted against; None abstained
- Result: Adopted

Security Council composition
- Permanent members: China; France; Russia; United Kingdom; United States
- Non-permanent members: Argentina; Brazil; Czech Republic; Djibouti; New Zealand; Nigeria; Oman; Pakistan; Rwanda; Spain

United Nations Security Council resolution 922, adopted unanimously on 31 May 1994, after reaffirming Resolution 696 (1991) and all subsequent resolutions on Angola, the council discussed the peace process during the civil war and extended the mandate of the United Nations Angola Verification Mission II (UNAVEM II) until 30 June 1994.

The council reiterated the importance it attached to the full and timely implementation of the "Acordos de Paz" peace agreement and relevant resolutions of the security council, and the importance of the role of the United Nations in this process.

The efforts of the Secretary-General Boutros Boutros-Ghali's Special Representative, Margaret Anstee, the Organisation of African Unity (OAU) and that of neighbouring states, particularly Zambia, was welcomed.

An increase in the strength of UNAVEM II by raising it to its previous level was proposed, in accordance with Resolution 903 (1994), but this noted along with concern at the resurgence of military operations in Angola which affected UNAVEM II's ability to carry out its mandate.

Concern was also expressed at violations of measures in Resolution 864 (1993) and long duration of peace talks in Lusaka, Zambia, appealing to both the Government of Angola and UNITA to reach an early and comprehensive peace settlement.

After extending the mandate of UNAVEM II, the council stressed that future decisions would depend on progress in the peace talks. The acceptance by the Angolan government on proposals concerning national reconciliation was welcomed and UNITA was urged to do likewise.

Any recommendations by the Secretary-General regarding the United Nations presence in Angola would be promptly considered, while its presence as a whole would be reviewed if a peace agreement had not been reached in Lusaka. In light of the discussions, further sanctions would not be placed on UNITA.

The continuation of military operations in the country, the worsening of the humanitarian situation and acts that would prevent the free distribution of humanitarian assistance were condemned. At the same time, countries, United Nations agencies and non-governmental organisations that had contributed assistance to Angola were praised.

The resolution concluded by asking the secretary-general to report to the council by 30 June 1994 on developments in the country.

== See also ==
- Angolan Civil War
- Angolan legislative election, 1992
- Angolan presidential election, 1992
- List of United Nations Security Council Resolutions 901 to 1000 (1994–1995)
- Lusaka Protocol
- United Nations Angola Verification Mission III
