= United Nations Security Council Resolution 908 =

UN Security Council Resolution 908
- Date: 31 March 1994
- Meeting no.: 3,356
- Code: S/RES/908 (Document)
- Subject: Bosnia and Herzegovina-Croatia
- Voting summary: 15 voted for; None voted against; None abstained
- Result: Adopted

Security Council composition
- Permanent members: China; France; Russia; United Kingdom; United States
- Non-permanent members: Argentina; Brazil; Czech Republic; Djibouti; New Zealand; Nigeria; Oman; Pakistan; Rwanda; Spain

United Nations Security Council resolution 908, adopted unanimously on 31 March 1994, after reaffirming all resolutions on the situation in the former Yugoslavia and in particular Resolution 871 (1993), the council extended the mandate of the United Nations Protection Force (UNPROFOR) until 30 September 1994 and declared its intention to increase the number of personnel in the peacekeeping force.

The security council welcomed the ceasefire between Bosnia and Herzegovina and the Bosnian Croats and the framework agreements between the two. It was important also that the Bosnian Serbs were involved in the negotiations. The ceasefire between Croatia and the local Serb authorities in the United Nations Protected Areas was welcomed as were the talks between Croatia and Serbia and Montenegro. Welcoming the progress in Sarajevo, the council noted that a strong and visible presence of UNPROFOR was essential to consolidate such progress, though the situation in Maglaj remained precarious. There were ongoing efforts to reopen Tuzla International Airport for humanitarian purposes. Also welcomed were a European Union fact-finding mission to Mostar to investigate conditions in the city and a joint civil mission to Sarajevo by the governments of the United Kingdom and United States. Throughout the process, the safety and freedom of movement of UNPROFOR personnel was reiterated.

After extending UNPROFOR's mandate, the council decided to increase the size of the mission by up to 3,500 additional troops with a review by 30 April 1994. UNPROFOR's plan for the reopening of Tuzla Airport for humanitarian purposes and its request for additional assistance were approved. It was decided that member states should, in cooperation with the secretary-general and UNPROFOR, provide air support in Croatia.

All parties were invited to co-operate with UNPROFOR in Croatia on confidence-building measures, including in the United Nations Protected Areas, and to revive the Joint Commission process which would see communication links and economic issues would be resumed and resolved. The secretary-general was requested by the council to keep it informed about the implementation of the United Nations peace plan for Croatia and the outcome of the negotiations. Based on these principles, the UNPROFOR mandate could be reviewed at any time. The appointment of an official by the secretary-general to restore public services in Sarajevo was welcomed. In accordance with Resolution 900 (1994), a voluntary trust fund was established to contribute toward this process.

The security council expressed with appreciation the steps taken by the United Nations, UNPROFOR and international humanitarian organisations to restore normal life in Bosnia and Herzegovina. All parties were called upon to meet their commitments, particularly for the Bosnian Croat party to release infrastructure equipment and material for humanitarian use. The presence of UNPROFOR and humanitarian aid in Maglaj has welcomed in promoting the well-being of its citizens while concern was expressed at the situation there. The security council demanded that the Bosnian Serbs end the military operations against the town of Maglaj and lift its blockade. The secretary-general suggested that the town be incorporated into the United Nations safe areas, which was noted by the council.

== See also ==
- Bosnian War
- Breakup of Yugoslavia
- Croatian War of Independence
- List of United Nations Security Council Resolutions 901 to 1000 (1994–1995)
- Yugoslav Wars
