= United Nations Security Council Resolution 871 =

UN Security Council Resolution 871
- Former Yugoslavia: 1. Bosnia and Herzegovina; 2. Croatia; 3. Macedonia
- Date: 4 October 1993
- Meeting no.: 3,286
- Code: S/RES/871 (Document)
- Subject: Former Yugoslavia
- Voting summary: 15 voted for; None voted against; None abstained
- Result: Adopted

Security Council composition
- Permanent members: China; France; Russia; United Kingdom; United States
- Non-permanent members: Brazil; Cape Verde; Djibouti; Hungary; Japan; Morocco; New Zealand; Pakistan; Spain; Venezuela

United Nations Security Council resolution 871, adopted unanimously on 4 October 1993, after reaffirming resolutions 713 (1992) and 743 (1992) and subsequent resolutions relating to the situation in the former Yugoslavia and United Nations Protection Force (UNPROFOR), the Council expressed concern that United Nations peacekeeping plan for Croatia, in particular Resolution 769 (1992), had not been implemented and went on to discuss the peace plan and extend UNPROFOR's mandate until 31 March 1994.

The Council reiterated its determination to ensure the security and safety of UNPROFOR and its freedom of movement in Croatia and Bosnia and Herzegovina. Acting under Chapter VII of the United Nations Charter, the Council adopted the Secretary-General Boutros Boutros-Ghali's recommendation to establish three subordinate commands within UNPROFOR:

(a) UNPROFOR (Croatia);
(b) UNPROFOR (Bosnia and Herzegovina);
(c) UNPROFOR (Macedonia).

The importance of the peace plan for Croatia was stressed, declaring that non-compliance with Security Council resolutions would have serious consequences. Military attacks in Bosnia and Herzegovina and Croatia were condemned. It also called for a ceasefire between Croatia and the Serbian authorities in the United Nations Protected Areas mediated by the International Conference on the Former Yugoslavia. The Council stated it was important that confidence was built up by the restoration of electricity and water supplies, and the reopening of restore rail and highways.

The resolution went on to authorise the use of force by UNPROFOR acting in self-defense to ensure its security and freedom of movement, deciding to review the extension of close air support to the peacekeeping force. The Secretary-General was requested to report back to the Security Council within two months on progress in implementing the United Nations peace plan for Croatia and the implementation of the mandate of UNPROFOR.

== See also ==
- Bosnian War
- Breakup of Yugoslavia
- Croatian War of Independence
- List of United Nations Security Council Resolutions 801 to 900 (1993–1994)
- Yugoslav Wars
- List of United Nations Security Council Resolutions related to the conflicts in former Yugoslavia
