= United Nations Security Council Resolution 939 =

UN Security Council Resolution 939
- Flag of Cyprus
- Date: 29 July 1994
- Meeting no.: 3,412
- Code: S/RES/939 (Document)
- Subject: Cyprus
- Voting summary: 14 voted for; None voted against; None abstained
- Result: Adopted

Security Council composition
- Permanent members: China; France; Russia; United Kingdom; United States
- Non-permanent members: Argentina; Brazil; Czech Republic; Djibouti; New Zealand; Nigeria; Oman; Pakistan; Rwanda; Spain

United Nations Security Council resolution 939, adopted on 29 July 1994, after recalling all relevant resolutions on Cyprus, the Council discussed the implementation of confidence-building measures as part of a wider process to settle the Cyprus dispute.

The Council reaffirmed that the status quo was unacceptable, noting the United Nations position that there should be a single Cyprus consisting of two politically equal communities in a bi-communal and bi-zonal federation, excluding union with another country or secession.

The Secretary-General Boutros Boutros-Ghali was requested to begin consultations with Security Council members, Guarantor Powers, and with leaders of the Republic of Cyprus and Northern Cyprus on ways to approach the Cyprus problem in a manner that would lead to results. In this context, all parties were urged to co-operate with the Secretary-General. A report was requested by the end of October 1994 concerning a programme for achieving an overall solution to the dispute and the implementation of the confidence-building measures.

Resolution 939 was adopted by 14 votes to none, while Rwanda was absent from the meeting.

== See also ==
- Cyprus dispute
- List of United Nations Security Council Resolutions 901 to 1000 (1994–1995)
- United Nations Buffer Zone in Cyprus
- Turkish invasion of Cyprus
