= United Nations Security Council Resolution 831 =

UN Security Council Resolution 831
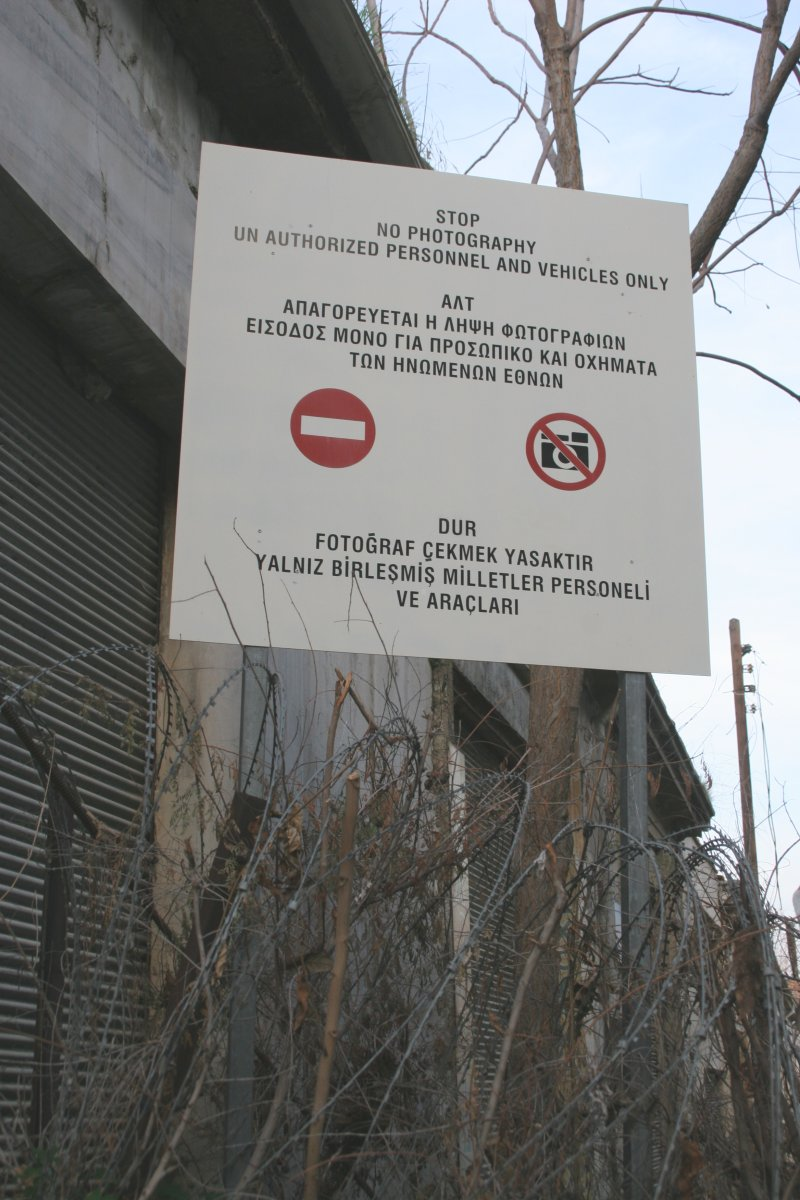
- Buffer zone sign
- Date: 27 May 1993
- Meeting no.: 3,222
- Code: S/RES/831 (Document)
- Subject: Cyprus
- Voting summary: 14 voted for; None voted against; 1 abstained
- Result: Adopted

Security Council composition
- Permanent members: China; France; Russia; United Kingdom; United States
- Non-permanent members: Brazil; Cape Verde; Djibouti; Hungary; Japan; Morocco; New Zealand; Pakistan; Spain; Venezuela

United Nations Security Council resolution 831, adopted on 27 May 1993, after reaffirming Resolution 186 (1964) and all subsequent resolutions on Cyprus, the Council discussed the financial situation surrounding the United Nations Peacekeeping Force in Cyprus (UNFICYP).

The Security Council reconfirmed that the extension of the mandate of the UNFICYP peacekeeping force in Cyprus would be reviewed every six months. It also stressed the importance of voluntary contributions to United Nations peacekeeping operations, in particular stressing the importance of an early settlement of the Cyprus dispute and the implementation of confidence-building measures. Both sides were instructed to co-operate with UNFICYP to extend the unmanning agreement of 1989 to all areas of the United Nations-controlled Buffer Zone where the two sides were near each other.

Resolution 831 went on to express appreciation for voluntary contributions made to UNFICYP, calling for further maximum voluntary contributions in the future. From the next extension of the mandate of the peacekeeping force on or before 15 June 1993, the costs not covered by voluntary contributions were to be covered as expenses of the United Nations. It also decided that UNFICYP should be restructured to include additional number of observers for reconnaissance, underlining the responsibility of the parties for minimising tension and facilitating the operation of UNFICYP on the island. This would involve a reduction of foreign troops and defence spending in Cyprus, and a review of UNFICYP by the Secretary-General Boutros Boutros-Ghali would take place in December 1993. During this time, the peacekeeping force was reduced by 28%.

The resolution was adopted by 14 votes to none, with one abstention from Pakistan.

== See also ==
- Cyprus dispute
- List of United Nations Security Council Resolutions 801 to 900 (1993–1994)
- Northern Cyprus
- Turkish invasion of Cyprus
