= United Nations Security Council Resolution 839 =

UN Security Council Resolution 839
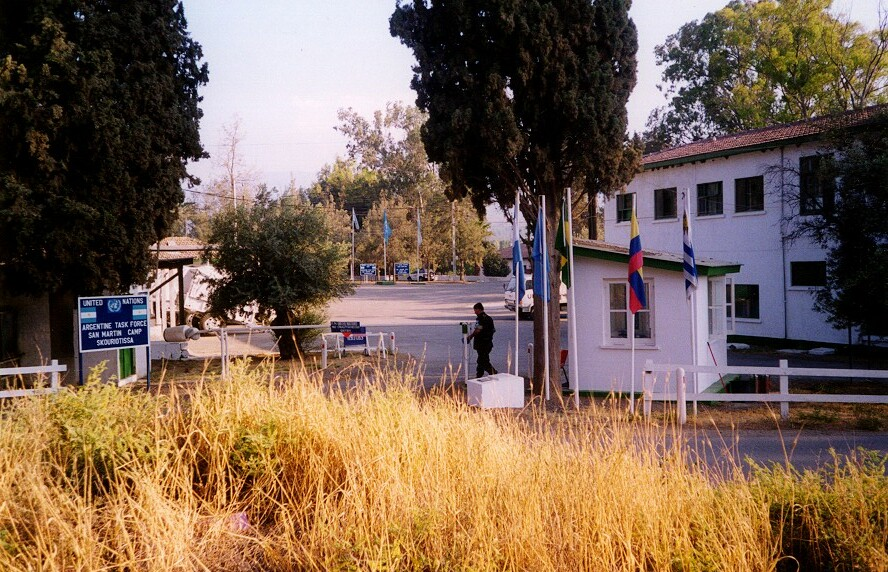
- UNFICYP camp
- Date: 11 June 1993
- Meeting no.: 3,235
- Code: S/RES/839 (Document)
- Subject: Cyprus
- Voting summary: 15 voted for; None voted against; None abstained
- Result: Adopted

Security Council composition
- Permanent members: China; France; Russia; United Kingdom; United States
- Non-permanent members: Brazil; Cape Verde; Djibouti; Hungary; Japan; Morocco; New Zealand; Pakistan; Spain; Venezuela

United Nations Security Council resolution 839, adopted unanimously on 11 June 1993, noted a report of the Secretary-General that, due to the existing circumstances, the presence of the United Nations Peacekeeping Force in Cyprus (UNFICYP) would continue to be essential for a peaceful settlement. The Council asked the Secretary-General to report back again before 15 November 1993, to follow the implementation of the resolution.

The Council reaffirmed its previous resolutions, including Resolution 365 (1974), expressed its concern over the situation, urged the involved parties to work together toward peace and once more extended the stationing of the Force in Cyprus, established in Resolution 186 (1964), until 15 December 1993.

The provisions of Resolution 831 (1993) were recalled concerning the restructuring of the Force and both sides were urged to take reciprocal measures to lower the tension and carry forward intercommunal talks between the Republic of Cyprus and Northern Cyprus.

== See also ==
- Cyprus dispute
- List of United Nations Security Council Resolutions 801 to 900 (1993–1994)
- United Nations Buffer Zone in Cyprus
- Turkish invasion of Cyprus
