= United Nations Security Council Resolution 909 =

UN Security Council Resolution 909
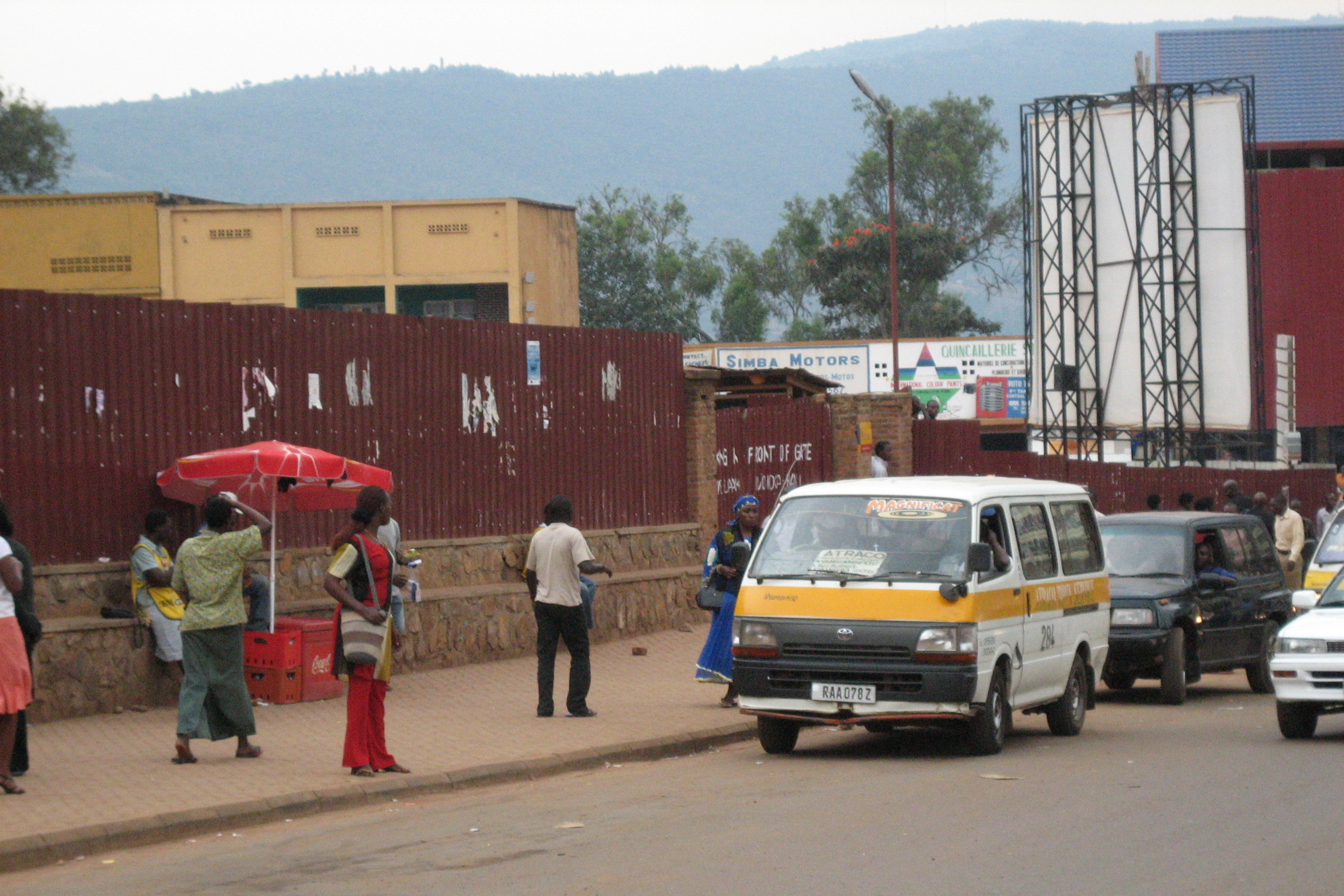
- Kigali
- Date: 5 April 1994
- Meeting no.: 3,358
- Code: S/RES/909 (Document)
- Subject: Rwanda
- Voting summary: 15 voted for; None voted against; None abstained
- Result: Adopted

Security Council composition
- Permanent members: China; France; Russia; United Kingdom; United States
- Non-permanent members: Argentina; Brazil; Czech Republic; Djibouti; New Zealand; Nigeria; Oman; Pakistan; Rwanda; Spain

United Nations Security Council resolution 909, adopted unanimously on 5 April 1994, after reaffirming resolutions 812 (1993), 846 (1993), 872 (1993), 891 (1993) and 893 (1994) on Rwanda, the Council expressed concern at deteriorating security and humanitarian situation in the country, particularly in Kigali, and extended the mandate of the United Nations Assistance Mission for Rwanda (UNAMIR) until 29 July 1994.

Concern was expressed at the delay in the establishment of a transitional government and Transitional National Authority which constituted a major obstacle to the Arusha Accords. The review of UNAMIR would take place within six weeks including the role of the United Nations in Rwanda if the Secretary-General Boutros Boutros-Ghali informed the Council that insufficient progress had been made in establishing the transitional authorities.

Both parties were urged to resolve their differences without delay with a view to establishing the transitional institutions, and despite the fact that the Arusha Peace Agreement had not been implemented, a ceasefire was being observed and commending the contribution made by UNAMIR. The continued support for UNAMIR was dependent upon the full implementation of the Arusha Accords. At the same time the efforts of the Secretary-General, his Special Representative, Member States and the Organisation for African Unity (OAU) for their efforts in the political process and for providing humanitarian and other assistance. Finally, the Secretary-General was requested to continue to monitor financial costs of UNAMIR.

== See also ==
- History of Rwanda
- List of United Nations Security Council Resolutions 901 to 1000 (1994–1995)
- Rwandan Civil War
