= United Nations Security Council Resolution 893 =

UN Security Council Resolution 893
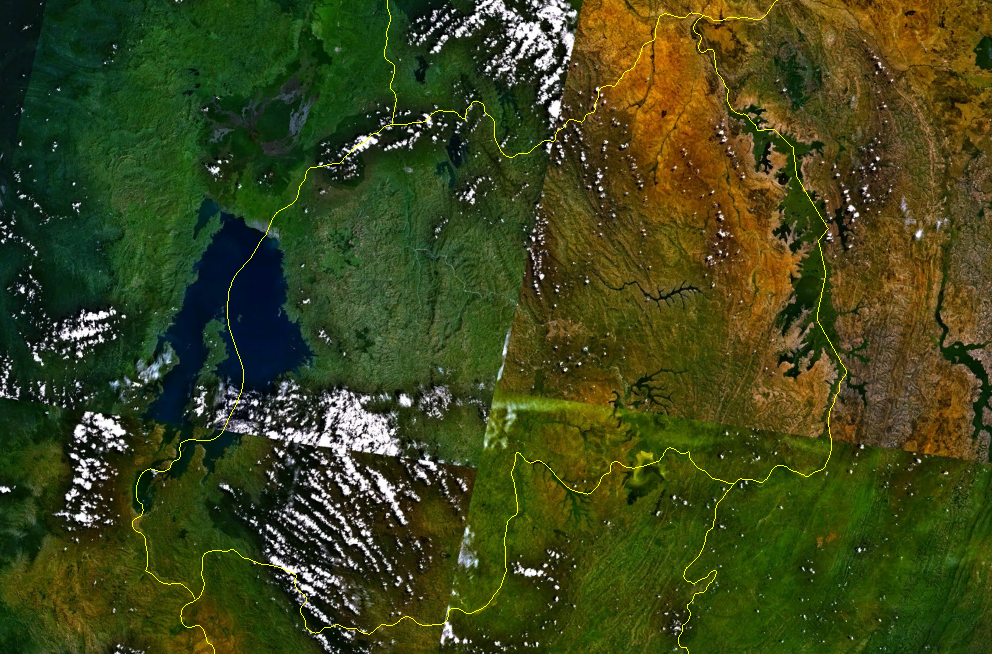
- Satellite view of Rwanda
- Date: 6 January 1994
- Meeting no.: 3,326
- Code: S/RES/893 (Document)
- Subject: Rwanda
- Voting summary: 15 voted for; None voted against; None abstained
- Result: Adopted

Security Council composition
- Permanent members: China; France; Russia; United Kingdom; United States
- Non-permanent members: Argentina; Brazil; Czech Republic; Djibouti; New Zealand; Nigeria; Oman; Pakistan; Rwanda; Spain

United Nations Security Council resolution 893, adopted unanimously on 6 January 1994, after reaffirming resolutions 812 (1993), 846 (1993), 872 (1993) and 891 (1993) on Rwanda, the Council noted that the situation in Rwanda could have implications for neighbouring Burundi and authorised the deployment of a second military battalion of the United Nations Assistance Mission for Rwanda (UNAMIR) to the demilitarised zone.

The Council urged both parties to co-operate with the peace process, comply with the Arusha Accords and in particular to establish a broad-based transitional government as soon as possible. It was stressed that continued support for UNAMIR will depend upon the implementation of the Arusha Accords. Attempts to improve dialogue among the parties by the Secretary-General Boutros Boutros-Ghali and his Special Representative were welcomed.

The efforts of Member States, United Nations agencies, the Organisation of African Unity and non-governmental organisations which had provided humanitarian aid were welcomed. Finally, the Secretary-General was requested to continue to monitor the size and cost of UNAMIR.

== See also ==
- Arusha Accords
- History of Rwanda
- List of United Nations Security Council Resolutions 801 to 900 (1993–1994)
- Rwandan Civil War
