= United Nations Security Council Resolution 959 =

UN Security Council Resolution 959
- Damaged parliament building in Sarajevo (before reconstruction)
- Date: 19 November 1994
- Meeting no.: 3,462
- Code: S/RES/959 (Document)
- Subject: Bosnia and Herzegovina
- Voting summary: 15 voted for; None voted against; None abstained
- Result: Adopted

Security Council composition
- Permanent members: China; France; Russia; United Kingdom; United States
- Non-permanent members: Argentina; Brazil; Czech Republic; Djibouti; New Zealand; Nigeria; Oman; Pakistan; Rwanda; Spain

United Nations Security Council resolution 959, adopted unanimously on 19 November 1994, after recalling all resolutions on the situation in Bosnia and Herzegovina including resolutions Resolution 824 (1993) and Resolution 836 (1993), the Council discussed the efforts of the United Nations Protection Force (UNPROFOR) to ensure the implementation of security council resolutions in the safe areas of Bosnia and Herzegovina.

The security council reaffirmed the need for a settlement between the Bosnian parties and condemned the Bosnian Serbs after they rejected a territorial settlement. Concern was expressed about the escalation of the fighting around Bihać and the safe area, and the subsequent displacement of persons. It reaffirmed previous calls to the parties to cease hostilities that could lead to a further escalation of tensions, and the need for an urgent ceasefire. The importance of Sarajevo as a multicultural, multiethnic, and religious centre was stressed. The statement by the European Union, Russia, United Kingdom and United States and their commitment to strengthen the regime of safe areas was noted.

There was concern about the hostilities in Bosnia and Herzegovina and violations of its international border with Croatia, particularly by the Krajina Serb forces. All parties were urged to co-operate with UNPROFOR to ensure implementation of security council resolutions on the safe areas. The Secretary-General Boutros Boutros-Ghali was asked about possible additional measures to stabilise the situation in Bihać. Both the secretary-general and UNPROFOR were required to continue negotiations with the Bosnian parties concerning the demilitarisation of Sarajevo and the restoration of normal life in the city in accordance with Resolution 900 (1994). Finally, the secretary-general was requested to report back to the council by 1 December 1994 on the implementation of the current resolution.

== See also ==
- Bosnian War
- Breakup of Yugoslavia
- Croatian War of Independence
- List of United Nations Security Council Resolutions 901 to 1000 (1994–1995)
- Yugoslav Wars
