= United Nations Security Council Resolution 840 =

UN Security Council Resolution 840
- Cambodia
- Date: 15 June 1993
- Meeting no.: 3,237
- Code: S/RES/840 (Document)
- Subject: Cambodia
- Voting summary: 15 voted for; None voted against; None abstained
- Result: Adopted

Security Council composition
- Permanent members: China; France; Russia; United Kingdom; United States
- Non-permanent members: Brazil; Cape Verde; Djibouti; Hungary; Japan; Morocco; New Zealand; Pakistan; Spain; Venezuela

United Nations Security Council resolution 840, adopted unanimously on 15 June 1993, after recalling resolutions 668 (1990), 745 (1992), 810 (1993), 826 (1993), 835 (1993) and other relevant resolutions, the Council endorsed the results of the 1993 general elections in Cambodia.

Tributes were paid to the former King Norodom Sihanouk for his leadership of the Supreme National Council and to the United Nations Transitional Authority in Cambodia (UNTAC) and Yasushi Akashi, Special Representative of the Secretary-General, for their efforts during the electoral process, which had been declared free and fair.

The Council called upon all political parties to fully respect the results of the elections and to co-operate during the transition process in order to maintain stability and promote national reconciliation. Support was given to the newly elected constituent assembly which had begun its work of drawing up a constitution, of which the constituent assembly would transform itself into a legislative assembly.

The Secretary-General, Boutros Boutros-Ghali, was requested to report back by mid-July 1993 on his recommendations for the possible role the United Nations and its agencies might play after the end of the mandate of UNTAC according to the Paris Agreements.

== See also ==
- List of United Nations Security Council Resolutions 801 to 900 (1993–1994)
- Modern Cambodia
- Transition of the People's Republic of Kampuchea to Cambodia
