= United Nations Security Council Resolution 835 =

UN Security Council Resolution 835
- Date: 2 June 1993
- Meeting no.: 3,227
- Code: S/RES/835 (Document)
- Subject: Cambodia
- Voting summary: 15 voted for; None voted against; None abstained
- Result: Adopted

Security Council composition
- Permanent members: China; France; Russia; United Kingdom; United States
- Non-permanent members: Brazil; Cape Verde; Djibouti; Hungary; Japan; Morocco; New Zealand; Pakistan; Spain; Venezuela

United Nations Security Council resolution 835, adopted unanimously on 2 June 1993, after recalling resolutions 668 (1990), 745 (1992), 810 (1993), 826 (1993) and other relevant resolutions, the council expressed appreciation for the United Nations Transitional Authority in Cambodia (UNTAC) in the aftermath of recent elections in Cambodia.

The council went on to commend the efforts of Yasushi Akashi, the special representative of the Secretary-General Boutros Boutros-Ghali in Cambodia for providing support despite the hardships and difficulties experienced. It also paid tribute to the then King of Cambodia Norodom Sihanouk for his leadership of the Supreme National Council and to the number of Cambodians who exercised their vote, further endorsing the view that the elections were free and fair.

Inviting the secretary-general to make his report available as soon as possible on the conduct of the elections, the council announced its intention to support the newly elected constituent assembly in forming a new government and drawing up a constitution. All parties were urged to respect the results of the elections after some discontent amongst the political parties, and to do all in their power to bring about the peaceful establishment of a democratic government. Finally, the international community was urged to contribute to the reconstruction and rehabilitation of Cambodia.

== See also ==
- List of United Nations Security Council Resolutions 801 to 900 (1993–1994)
- Modern Cambodia
- Transition of the People's Republic of Kampuchea to Cambodia
