= United Nations Security Council Resolution 897 =

UN Security Council Resolution 897
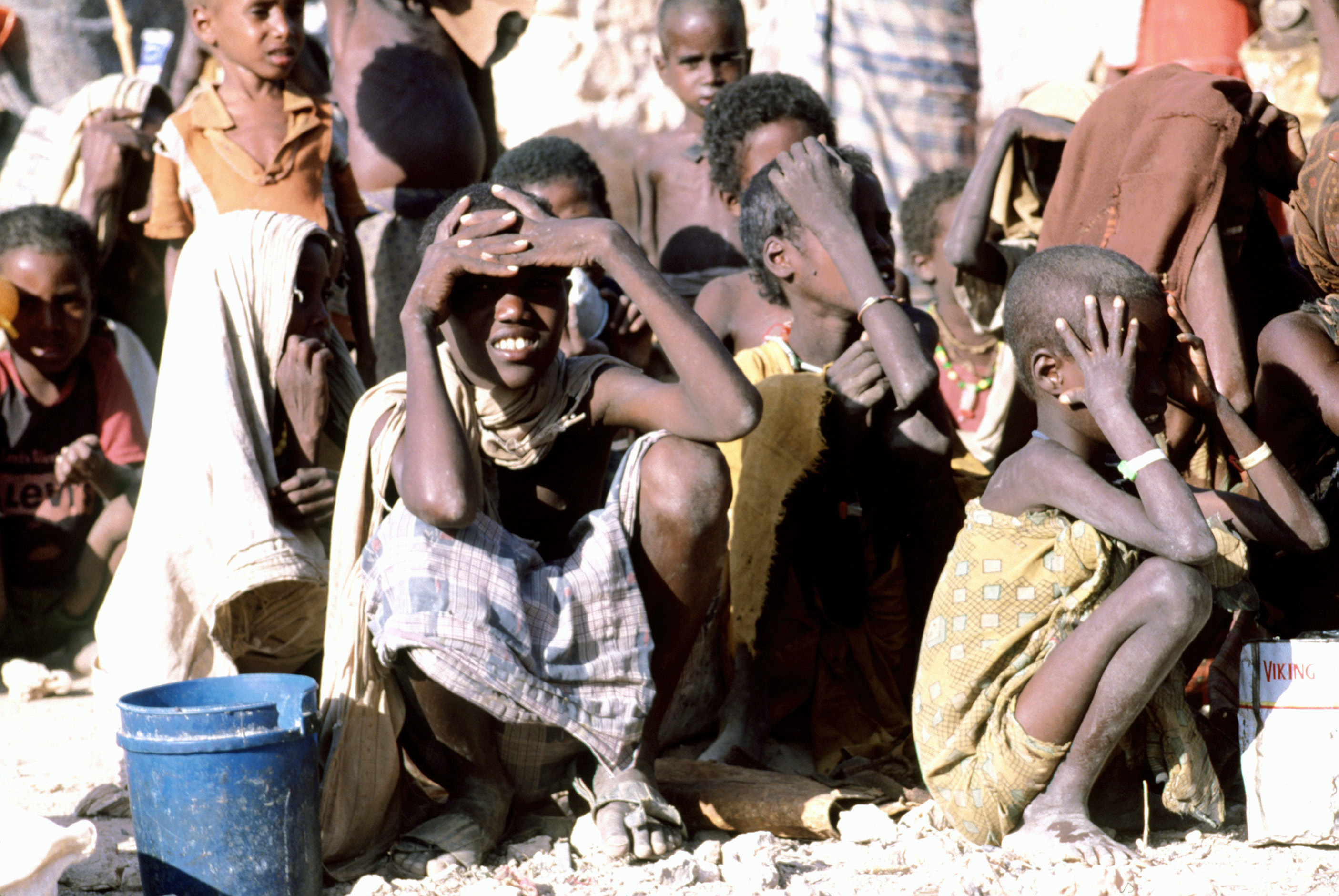
- Somali children waiting for relief supplies
- Date: 4 February 1994
- Meeting no.: 3,334
- Code: S/RES/897 (Document)
- Subject: Somalia
- Voting summary: 15 voted for; None voted against; None abstained
- Result: Adopted

Security Council composition
- Permanent members: China; France; Russia; United Kingdom; United States
- Non-permanent members: Argentina; Brazil; Czech Republic; Djibouti; New Zealand; Nigeria; Oman; Pakistan; Rwanda; Spain

United Nations Security Council resolution 897, adopted unanimously on 4 February 1994, after reaffirming resolutions 733 (1992) and 886 (1992) and all of its subsequent resolutions on Somalia, the Council discussed the role of the United Nations Operation in Somalia II (UNOSOM II) in the peace process in the country.

The Security Council reaffirmed its decision to continue the mandate of the UNOSOM II mission until 31 May 1994, with the aim of completing its mission by March 1995. It was important that all parties abided by the obligations they entered into agreements, particularly as agreements signed in Addis Ababa were the basis for resolving the conflict. Concern was expressed at the build up of weapons by Somali factions in several areas of the country. The continuing incidents of fighting and banditry against aid workers and peacekeepers were condemned and disarmament in order to establish peace was stressed. The Council commemorated those who had died and reiterated the importance that was attached to their safety. Furthermore, it was important that district and regional councils, a national council, police and a legal system were founded, with the commitment of the international community in this process was stated.

Determining that the situation in Somalia continued to constitute a threat to international peace and security, acting under Chapter VII of the United Nations Charter, revised the mandate of UNOSOM II as follows:

(a) assisting with the implementation of peace agreements, particularly in relation to disarmament and respect for the ceasefire;
(b) protecting ports, airports and other essential infrastructure and communication lines;
(c) delivering humanitarian aid;
(d) assisting in the reorganisation of the police and judiciary;
(e) helping in the repatriation and resettlement of displaced persons and refugees;
(f) assisting in the political process in Somalia to achieve a democratically elected government;
(g) protecting personnel from the United Nations and international humanitarian organisations.

It also strengthened the mission to 22,000 personnel. The safer regions of Somalia were given priority in reconstruction, as was the process of demining with the Secretary-General Boutros Boutros-Ghali requested to ensure the start of as soon as possible. After reaffirming the continuing arms embargo on the country, the Council urged Somali parties to co-operate with each other and UNOSOM II, respecting the ceasefire and refraining from violence against United Nations and humanitarian personnel.

The Secretary-General was in requested to establish contact with Somali parties after consultations with the Organisation of African Unity and the Arab League to agree on a timetable for the implementation of the Addis Ababa Agreements. It was expected that the process would be completed by March 1995. Finally, Boutros-Ghali was requested to report to the Council in good time before 31 May 1994 on the situation.

== See also ==
- History of Somalia
- List of United Nations Security Council Resolutions 801 to 900 (1993–1994)
- Somali Civil War
