= United Nations Security Council Resolution 815 =

United Nations Security Council resolution

UN Security Council Resolution 815
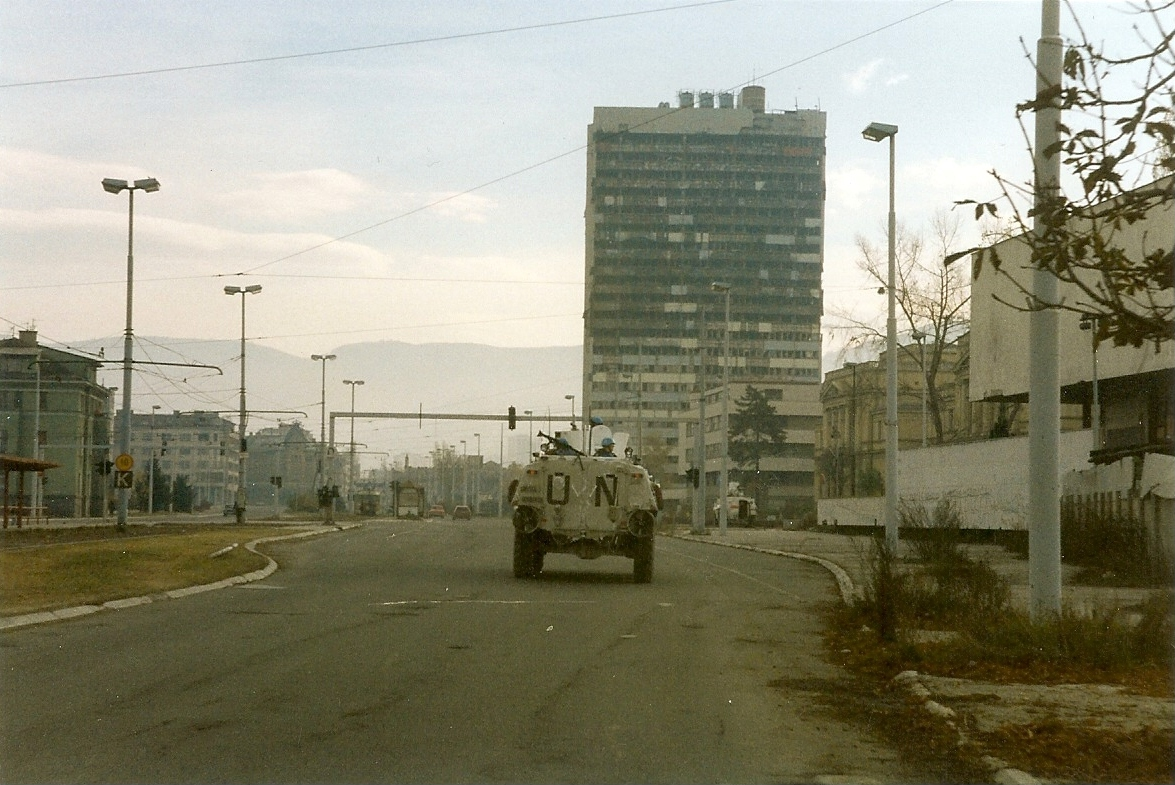
- UN troops in Sarajevo
- Date: 30 March 1993
- Meeting no.: 3,189
- Code: S/RES/815 (Document)
- Subject: Croatia
- Voting summary: 15 voted for; None voted against; None abstained
- Result: Adopted

Security Council composition
- Permanent members: China; France; Russia; United Kingdom; United States
- Non-permanent members: Brazil; Cape Verde; Djibouti; Hungary; Japan; Morocco; New Zealand; Pakistan; Spain; Venezuela

United Nations Security Council resolution 815, adopted unanimously on 30 March 1993, after reaffirming Resolution 743 (1992) and all subsequent relevant resolutions concerning the United Nations Protection Force (UNPROFOR) including 802 (1993) and 807 (1993), the council, acting under Chapter VII of the United Nations Charter, extended UNPROFOR's mandate for an additional interim period ending 30 June 1993.

The council members also noted that it would reconsider UNPROFOR's mandate one month after the adoption of the current resolution in light of any new developments. It also reaffirmed its support for the co-chairmen of the steering committee of the International Conference on the Former Yugoslavia in their efforts to help to define the future status of those territories comprising the United Nations Protected Areas which are integral parts of Croatia, demanding full respect for the Geneva Conventions and international humanitarian law in these areas and freedom of movement for UNPROFOR.

== See also ==
- Breakup of Yugoslavia
- Bosnian War
- Croatian War of Independence
- List of United Nations Security Council Resolutions 801 to 900 (1993–1994)
- Yugoslav Wars
- List of United Nations Security Council Resolutions related to the conflicts in former Yugoslavia
