= United Nations Security Council Resolution 880 =

UN Security Council Resolution 880
- Flag of Cambodia
- Date: 4 November 1993
- Meeting no.: 3,303
- Code: S/RES/880 (Document)
- Subject: Cambodia
- Voting summary: 15 voted for; None voted against; None abstained
- Result: Adopted

Security Council composition
- Permanent members: China; France; Russia; United Kingdom; United States
- Non-permanent members: Brazil; Cape Verde; Djibouti; Hungary; Japan; Morocco; New Zealand; Pakistan; Spain; Venezuela

United Nations Security Council resolution 880, adopted unanimously on 4 November 1993, after recalling Resolution 745 (1992) and other relevant resolutions on Cambodia, the Council concerned itself with the withdrawal of the United Nations Transitional Authority in Cambodia (UNTAC) from the country.

The security council welcomed the transitional period in which peace, stability and reconciliation were brought about under the leadership of Norodom Sihanouk, now King of Cambodia. A newly adopted constitution, establishment of a government and conclusion of elections in accordance with the Paris Agreements was welcomed, allowing the council to declare that the objectives of the agreements had been fulfilled.

Tributes were paid to the member states which contributed personnel to UNTAC while condolences were paid to those that lost nationals. The rapid delivery of international assistance towards rehabilitation, reconstruction and development in Cambodia and towards peace-building was stressed, as was the need to ensure the safety of withdrawing UNTAC personnel and the continuity of mine clearance.

The resolution again welcomed the accession of King Norodom Sihanouk, who played an important role in the peace process. It also welcomed the formation of a new government and celebrated the work of UNTAC for its role in Cambodia. At the same time, Member States were urged to respect the sovereignty, territorial integrity and neutrality of Cambodia and demanded all attacks by the Khmer faction against the Government of Cambodia or UNTAC cease. Given Cambodia's history, the respect for international humanitarian law in the country was affirmed, requesting countries to provide technical experts and equipment and voluntary contributions.

The withdrawal of the military component UNTAC by 15 November 1993, as provided for in Resolution 860 (1993) would go ahead, while extending the mandate of mine clearance and training unit until 30 November 1993 and military police and medical components by 31 December 1993.

A team of 20 military observers was then established, known as the United Nations Military Liaison Team (UNMLT) to monitor the situation in the country after the withdrawal of UNTAC. The intention of the Secretary-General Boutros Boutros-Ghali's intention to appoint a person to coordinate the United Nations presence in Cambodia was welcomed, as was his intention to report on the lessons learned during the course of the entire UNTAC operation.

== See also ==
- List of United Nations Security Council Resolutions 801 to 900 (1993–1994)
- Modern Cambodia
- People's Republic of Kampuchea#Transition and State of Cambodia (1989–1992)
