= United Nations Security Council Resolution 899 =

UN Security Council Resolution 899
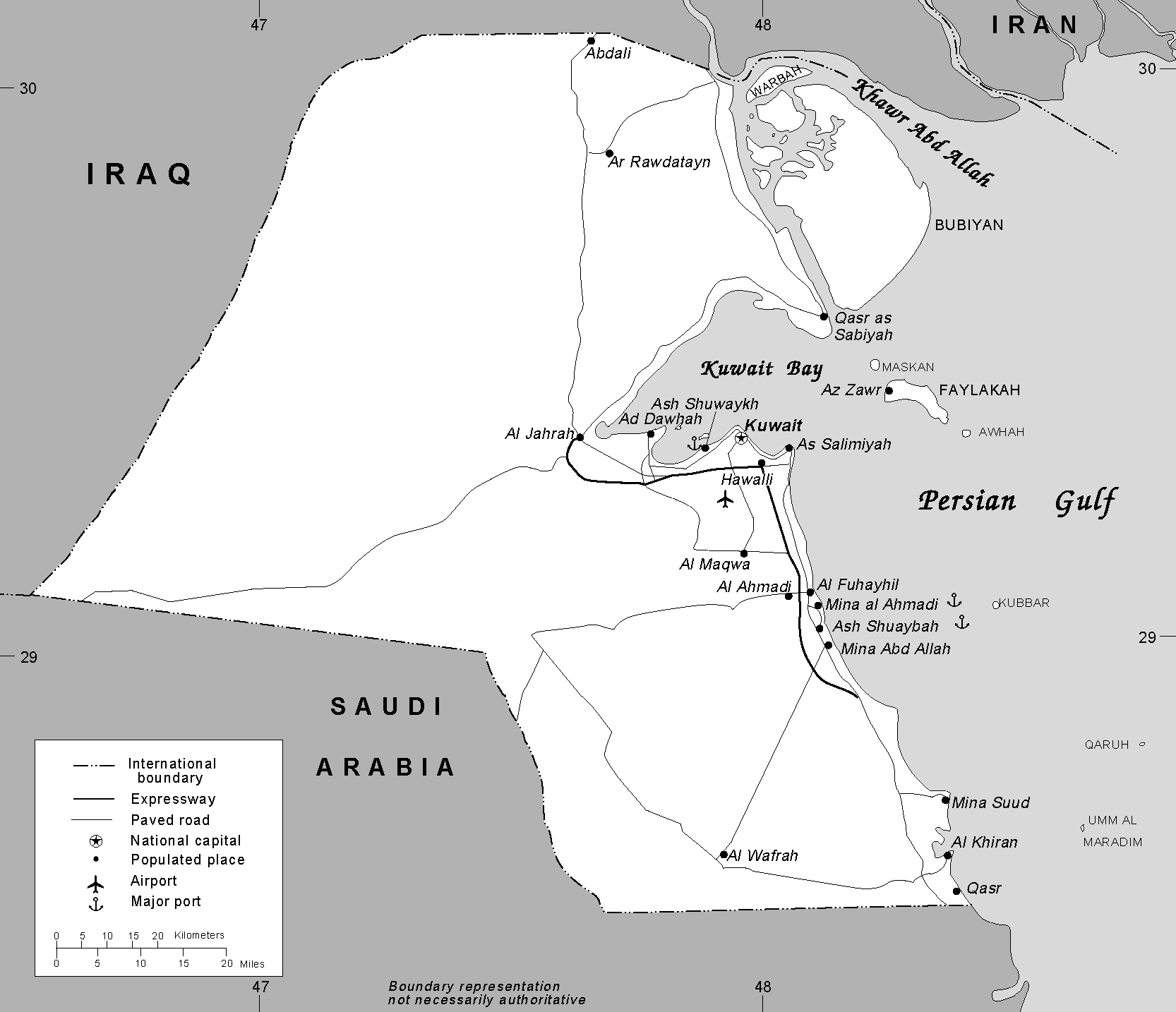
- Kuwait
- Date: 4 March 1994
- Meeting no.: 3,343
- Code: S/RES/899 (Document)
- Subject: Iraq–Kuwait
- Voting summary: 15 voted for; None voted against; None abstained
- Result: Adopted

Security Council composition
- Permanent members: China; France; Russia; United Kingdom; United States
- Non-permanent members: Argentina; Brazil; Czech Republic; Djibouti; New Zealand; Nigeria; Oman; Pakistan; Rwanda; Spain

United Nations Security Council resolution 899, adopted unanimously on 4 March 1994, after recalling Resolution 833 (1993) and considering a letter by the Secretary-General Boutros Boutros-Ghali concerning the matter of the Iraqi private citizens and their assets which remained on Kuwaiti territory following the demarcation of the international boundary between Iraq and Kuwait, the council, acting under Chapter VII of the United Nations Charter, decided that compensation payments may be remitted to the private citizens concerned in Iraq, notwithstanding the provisions of Resolution 661 (1991).

== See also ==
- Gulf War
- Invasion of Kuwait
- Kuwait–Iraq barrier
- List of United Nations Security Council Resolutions 801 to 900 (1993–1994)
