= United Nations Security Council Resolution 889 =

UN Security Council Resolution 889
- Location of Cyprus within the European Union
- Date: 15 December 1993
- Meeting no.: 3,322
- Code: S/RES/889 (Document)
- Subject: Cyprus
- Voting summary: 15 voted for; None voted against; None abstained
- Result: Adopted

Security Council composition
- Permanent members: China; France; Russia; United Kingdom; United States
- Non-permanent members: Brazil; Cape Verde; Djibouti; Hungary; Japan; Morocco; New Zealand; Pakistan; Spain; Venezuela

United Nations Security Council resolution 889, adopted unanimously on 15 December 1993, after recalling Resolution 186 (1964) and other relevant resolutions on Cyprus, the council noted a report of the Secretary-General Boutros Boutros-Ghali and extended the mandate of the United Nations Peacekeeping Force in Cyprus (UNFICYP) until 15 June 1994.

Under the current circumstances, the Council noted that an adjustment in the structure and strength of power was not possible at present. The military authorities on both sides of the buffer zone were told to ensure no more incidents occurred along the border, urging countries to reduce the number of foreign troops in the Republic of Cyprus and asking the Republic of Cyprus to reduce defence spending to help restore confidence in the peace progress, as envisaged in the "Set of Ideas".

Military authorities in the Republic of Cyprus and Northern Cyprus were urged to enter into discussions concerning the prohibition of live ammunition or weapons other those that are hand-held along the ceasefire line, in addition to banning the firing of weapons within sight or hearing of the United Nations buffer zone. The leaders of both communities were urged to promote reconciliation and tolerance, while affirming that the status quo is unacceptable. A set of confidence-building measures which Turkey and Greece supported, would help the situation. To this end, the secretary-general was asked to report to the council by the end of February 1994 on the outcome of the confidence-building measures and then the future of the United Nations role in Cyprus would be reviewed.

== See also ==
- Cyprus dispute
- List of United Nations Security Council Resolutions 801 to 900 (1993–1994)
- United Nations Buffer Zone in Cyprus
- Turkish Invasion of Cyprus
