= United Nations Security Council Resolution 848 =

UN Security Council Resolution 848
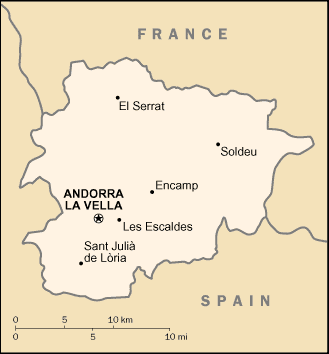
- Location of Andorra
- Date: 8 July 1993
- Meeting no.: 3,251
- Code: S/RES/848 (Document)
- Subject: Admission of new Members to the UN: Andorra
- Result: Adopted

Security Council composition
- Permanent members: China; France; Russia; United Kingdom; United States
- Non-permanent members: Brazil; Cape Verde; Djibouti; Hungary; Japan; Morocco; New Zealand; Pakistan; Spain; Venezuela

United Nations Security Council resolution 848, adopted without a vote on 8 July 1993, after examining the application of the Principality of Andorra for membership in the United Nations, the Council recommended to the General Assembly that Andorra be admitted.

== See also ==
- Member states of the United Nations
- List of United Nations Security Council Resolutions 801 to 900 (1993–1994)
