= United Nations Security Council Resolution 842 =

UN Security Council Resolution 842
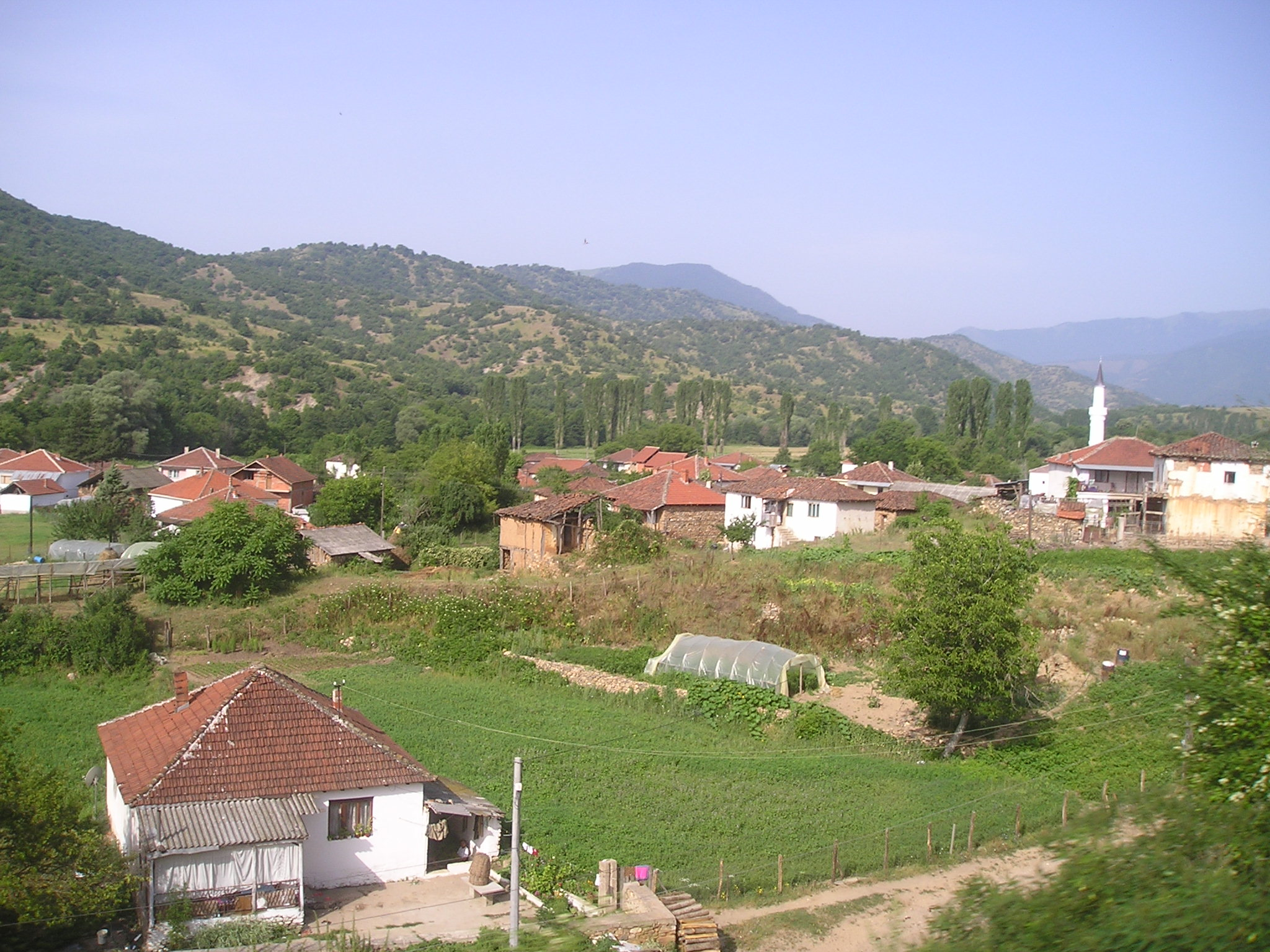
- Village in Macedonia
- Date: 18 June 1993
- Meeting no.: 3,239
- Code: S/RES/842 (Document)
- Subject: Former Yugoslav Republic of Macedonia
- Voting summary: 15 voted for; None voted against; None abstained
- Result: Adopted

Security Council composition
- Permanent members: China; France; Russia; United Kingdom; United States
- Non-permanent members: Brazil; Cape Verde; Djibouti; Hungary; Japan; Morocco; New Zealand; Pakistan; Spain; Venezuela

United Nations Security Council resolution 842, adopted unanimously on 18 June 1993, after reaffirming Resolution 743 (1992) concerning the United Nations Protection Force (UNPROFOR) and Resolution 795 (1992) which authorised its presence in the Republic of Macedonia, the Council welcomed an increase in the number of peacekeeping personnel in the country.

The resolution welcomed the announcement of the United States to deploy an additional 300 troops in Macedonia by July 1993, alongside 700 Scandinavian troops already in the country.

== See also ==
- Breakup of Yugoslavia
- List of United Nations Security Council Resolutions 801 to 900 (1993–1994)
- United Nations Preventive Deployment Force
- Yugoslav Wars
