= United Nations Security Council Resolution 869 =

UN Security Council Resolution 869
- Date: 30 September 1993
- Meeting no.: 3,284
- Code: S/RES/869 (Document)
- Subject: Former Yugoslavia
- Voting summary: 15 voted for; None voted against; None abstained
- Result: Adopted

Security Council composition
- Permanent members: China; France; Russia; United Kingdom; United States
- Non-permanent members: Brazil; Cape Verde; Djibouti; Hungary; Japan; Morocco; New Zealand; Pakistan; Spain; Venezuela

United Nations Security Council resolution 869, adopted unanimously on 30 September 1993, after reaffirming Resolution 743 (1992) and subsequent resolutions relating to the United Nations Protection Force (UNPROFOR), the Council extended its mandate for a further 24 hours until 1 October 1993.

The Council reiterated its determination to ensure the security of UNPROFOR and its freedom of movement for all its missions in Bosnia and Herzegovina and Croatia.

== See also ==
- Bosnian War
- Breakup of Yugoslavia
- Croatian War of Independence
- List of United Nations Security Council Resolutions 801 to 900 (1993–1994)
- Yugoslav Wars
- List of United Nations Security Council Resolutions related to the conflicts in former Yugoslavia
