= United Nations Security Council Resolution 898 =

UN Security Council Resolution 898
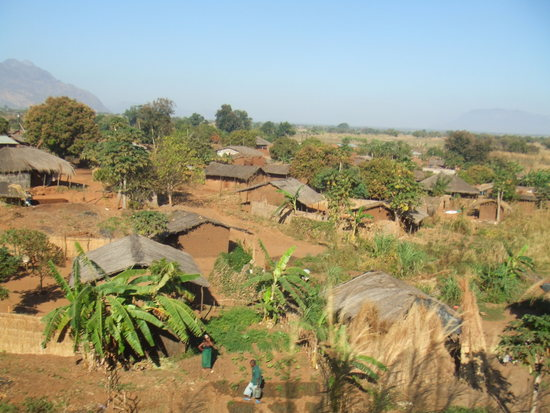
- Village in Mozambique
- Date: 23 February 1994
- Meeting no.: 3,338
- Code: S/RES/898 (Document)
- Subject: Mozambique
- Voting summary: 15 voted for; None voted against; None abstained
- Result: Adopted

Security Council composition
- Permanent members: China; France; Russia; United Kingdom; United States
- Non-permanent members: Argentina; Brazil; Czech Republic; Djibouti; New Zealand; Nigeria; Oman; Pakistan; Rwanda; Spain

United Nations Security Council resolution 898, adopted unanimously on 23 February 1994, after reaffirming Resolution 782 (1992) and all subsequent resolutions on Mozambique, the Council discussed the implementation of the Rome General Peace Accords and established a 1,144 strong police component of the United Nations Operation in Mozambique (ONUMOZ).

After reviewing the status of the ONUMOZ mission, the importance of the General Peace Agreement and its timely implementation by all parties was reiterated. Positive developments were welcomed though there were still some delays. A request by the Government of Mozambique and RENAMO was noted regarding observation of police activities and in this regard, the Secretary-General Boutros Boutros-Ghali recommended the establishment of a police component of ONUMOZ with a view to reducing the military component.

A police component of up to 1,144 personnel was established. The Secretary-General was requested to prepare for the withdrawal of part of the military component and to draw plans for the completion of the ONUMOZ mandate by November 1994, when an elected government is in office. Timetables were also to be drawn for the withdrawal of military observers after demilitarisation had taken place and for the drawdown of military forces in the transportation corridors when the new national defence force was operational.

Recent positive developments including the commencement of the assembly of troops, dismantling of paramilitary militias, the electoral law and the appointment of the National Electoral Commission, were welcomed. At the same time there was concern at delays including the demobilisation and the formation of a national army. The two parties were called on to implement the peace agreement, and in particular the ceasefire and demobilisation and cantonment of forces. They were also asked to prepare for elections no later than October 1994.

The international community was asked to help contribute to the demobilisation of troops and the training of the new defense army in Mozambique. It was also important to ensure the return of refugees and displaced persons. The Secretary-General was requested to ensure maximum economy in the operations of ONUMOZ, with the Council awaiting his next report on progress and the timetable by which ONUMOZ's mandate will be reviewed.

== See also ==
- Elections in Mozambique
- History of Mozambique
- List of United Nations Security Council Resolutions 801 to 900 (1993–1994)
