= United Nations Security Council Resolution 891 =

UN Security Council Resolution 891
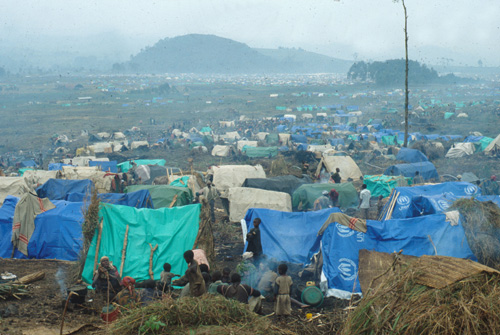
- Rwandan refugee camp in eastern Zaire (now Democratic Republic of the Congo)
- Date: 20 December 1993
- Meeting no.: 3,324
- Code: S/RES/891 (Document)
- Subject: Rwanda
- Voting summary: 15 voted for; None voted against; None abstained
- Result: Adopted

Security Council composition
- Permanent members: China; France; Russia; United Kingdom; United States
- Non-permanent members: Brazil; Cape Verde; Djibouti; Hungary; Japan; Morocco; New Zealand; Pakistan; Spain; Venezuela

United Nations Security Council resolution 891, adopted unanimously on 20 December 1993, after reaffirming resolutions 812 (1993), 846 (1993) and 872 (1993) on the situation in Rwanda, the Council noted that the presence of the United Nations Observer Mission Uganda–Rwanda (UNOMUR) had contributed to the stability of the area and extended its mandate for an additional six months.

The Council noted that the integration of UNOMUR and the United Nations Assistance Mission for Rwanda (UNAMIR) is solely administrative in that no way would it affect the mandate UNOMUR. The co-operation of the Government of Uganda was welcomed, and all civilian and military authorities in the mandate area were urged to co-operate with the mission.

== See also ==
- Arusha Accords
- History of Rwanda
- List of United Nations Security Council Resolutions 801 to 900 (1993–1994)
- Rwandan Civil War
