= United Nations Security Council Resolution 847 =

UN Security Council Resolution 847
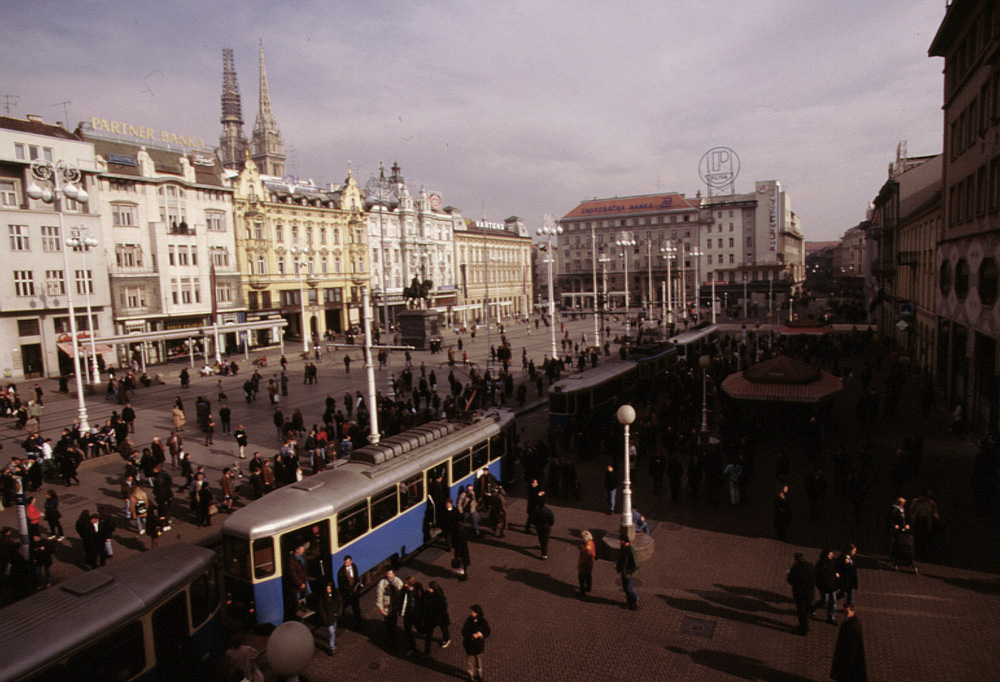
- Croatian capital Zagreb
- Date: 30 June 1993
- Meeting no.: 3,248
- Code: S/RES/847 (Document)
- Subject: Former Yugoslavia
- Voting summary: 15 voted for; None voted against; None abstained
- Result: Adopted

Security Council composition
- Permanent members: China; France; Russia; United Kingdom; United States
- Non-permanent members: Brazil; Cape Verde; Djibouti; Hungary; Japan; Morocco; New Zealand; Pakistan; Spain; Venezuela

United Nations Security Council resolution 847, adopted unanimously on 30 June 1993, after reaffirming Resolution 743 (1992) and subsequent resolutions relating to the United Nations Protection Force (UNPROFOR), the council condemned military attacks in Croatia and Bosnia and Herzegovina and extended the mandate of UNPROFOR until 30 September 1993.

The importance of seeking political solutions to the various conflicts in the territory of the former Yugoslavia was stressed, and of ensuring confidence and stability in the Republic of Macedonia. The territorial integrity of member states where the peacekeeping force was deployed was also reaffirmed by the council. The resolution also called on all parties and others concerned to reach an agreement on confidence-building measures in Croatia, including the opening of a railroad between Zagreb and the coastal city of Split, the highway between Zagreb and Županja, and the Adriatic oil pipeline, securing the uninterrupted traffic across the Maslenica straits, and restoring the supply of electricity and water to all regions in Croatia and the United Nations Protected Areas.

The council announced its determination for the safety and freedom of movement of UNPROFOR, acting under Chapter VII of the United Nations Charter, its mandate was extended and the Secretary-General Boutros Boutros-Ghali was requested to report back on the implementation of the current resolution.

== See also ==
- Bosnian War
- Breakup of Yugoslavia
- Croatian War of Independence
- List of United Nations Security Council Resolutions 801 to 900 (1993–1994)
- Yugoslav Wars
- List of United Nations Security Council Resolutions related to the conflicts in former Yugoslavia
