= United Nations Security Council Resolution 868 =

UN Security Council Resolution 868
- Peacekeeping operations
- Date: 29 September 1993
- Meeting no.: 3,283
- Code: S/RES/868 (Document)
- Subject: Peacekeeping operations
- Voting summary: 15 voted for; None voted against; None abstained
- Result: Adopted

Security Council composition
- Permanent members: China; France; Russia; United Kingdom; United States
- Non-permanent members: Brazil; Cape Verde; Djibouti; Hungary; Japan; Morocco; New Zealand; Pakistan; Spain; Venezuela

United Nations Security Council resolution 868, adopted unanimously on 29 September 1993, after expressing concern at the increasing number of attacks and use of force against persons engaged in United Nations peacekeeping operations, the council established new safety mandates for United Nations peacekeepers.

The provisions of the Convention on the Privileges and Immunities of the United Nations was recalled as applicable to United Nations operations and persons engaged in such operations. All attacks on United Nations peacekeepers were condemned, and moves in the General Assembly to consider new measures relating to the security and safety of United Nations forces and personnel.

The council encouraged the Secretary-General Boutros Boutros-Ghali to take forward measures proposed in his report to ensure that security matters are an integral part of the planning for an operation and that any such precautions extend to all personnel engaged in such operations. All countries and parties to conflicts were urged to co-operate closely with the United Nations to ensure the security and safety of United Nations forces and personnel. The resolution also confirmed that attacks and the use of force against peacekeeping missions will be considered interference with the Security Council's responsibilities, and that it would consider further measures if appropriate. Further measures would be taken against the host country if it is unable or unwilling to meet its obligations with regard to the safety and security of United Nations operations and personnel.

When considering the authorisation of future peacekeeping operations, the council would require:

(a) the host country to take appropriate steps to ensure the safety and security of United Nations personnel;
(b) the security and safety arrangements undertaken by the host country apply to all persons engaged in the United Nations operation;
(c) the signing of a Status of Forces Agreement is concluded.

The resolution concluded by requesting the secretary-general, when considering further peacekeeping operations, to take into account the provisions of the current resolution.

== See also ==
- History of United Nations peacekeeping
- List of United Nations Security Council Resolutions 801 to 900 (1993–1994)
- Timeline of United Nations peacekeeping missions
