= United Nations Security Council Resolution 829 =

UN Security Council Resolution 829
- Location of Monaco
- Date: 26 May 1993
- Meeting no.: 3,219
- Code: S/RES/829 (Document)
- Subject: Admission of new Members to the UN: Monaco
- Result: Adopted

Security Council composition
- Permanent members: China; France; Russia; United Kingdom; United States
- Non-permanent members: Brazil; Cape Verde; Djibouti; Hungary; Japan; Morocco; New Zealand; Pakistan; Spain; Venezuela

United Nations Security Council Resolution 829, adopted without a vote on 26 May 1993, after examining the application of the Principality of Monaco for membership in the United Nations, the Council recommended to the General Assembly that Monaco be admitted.

== See also ==
- Member states of the United Nations
- List of United Nations Security Council Resolutions 801 to 900 (1993–1994)
