= United Nations Security Council Resolution 859 =

UN Security Council Resolution 859
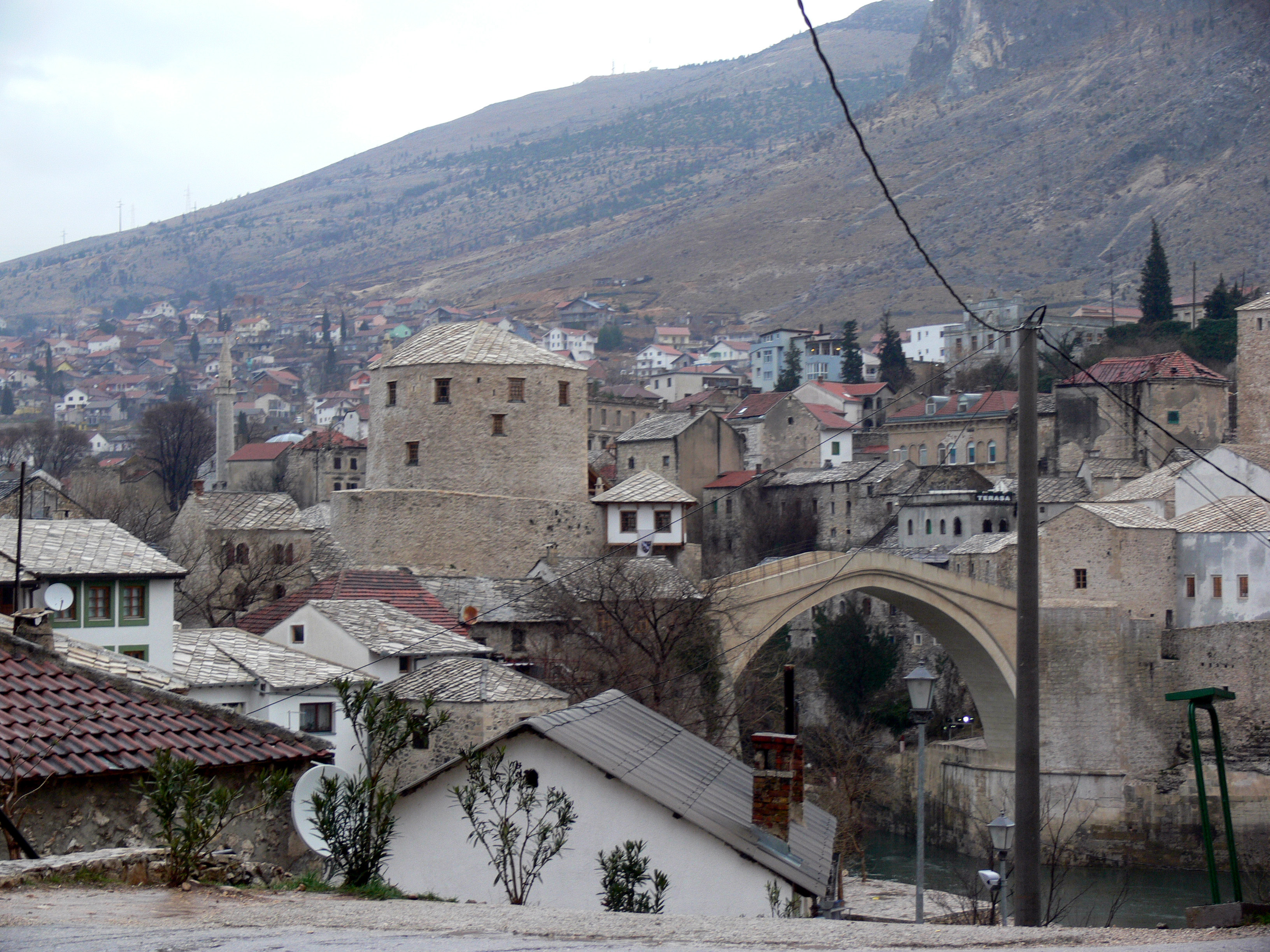
- Mostar in Bosnia and Herzegovina with the Stari Most bridge that was destroyed and subsequently rebuilt
- Date: 24 August 1993
- Meeting no.: 3,269
- Code: S/RES/859 (Document)
- Subject: Bosnia and Herzegovina
- Voting summary: 15 voted for; None voted against; None abstained
- Result: Adopted

Security Council composition
- Permanent members: China; France; Russia; United Kingdom; United States
- Non-permanent members: Brazil; Cape Verde; Djibouti; Hungary; Japan; Morocco; New Zealand; Pakistan; Spain; Venezuela

United Nations Security Council resolution 859, adopted unanimously on 24 August 1993, after recalling all resolutions on the situation in Bosnia and Herzegovina, the council noted that, despite all previous security council resolutions since Resolution 713 (1991), the region was still a scene of hostilities and there was little compliance with previous resolutions, particularly by the Bosnian Serb party.

All war crimes and violations of international humanitarian law were condemned and concern was expressed at the deteriorating situation in Mostar in particular. The council announced its determination to support efforts by the United Nations Protection Force (UNPROFOR) and the United Nations High Commissioner for Refugees (UNHCR) in continuing to provide humanitarian assistance to the civilian population.

The siege of Sarajevo, Mostar and other cities was met with concern by the council, which condemned the disruption of public utilities by the Bosnian Serb party in particular, calling on all parties to restore them. The security council reaffirmed that it was unacceptable to acquire territory by force and ethnic cleansing, stressing that an end to the hostilities in Bosnia and Herzegovina is required to achieve meaningful progress in the peace process. As the resolution determined that the situation in Bosnia and Herzegovina continued to constitute a threat to international peace and security, the measures taken within it would be enacted under Chapter VII of the United Nations Charter.

The security council called for a solution to be found during the peace talks in Geneva, Switzerland, and for an immediate ceasefire in Bosnia and Herzegovina. Demands for unrestricted aid, food, water, electricity, fuel and communications were made in addition to respect for UNPROFOR and UNHCR personnel. Meanwhile, the Secretary-General Boutros Boutros-Ghali had indicated that the air force in support of UNPROFOR was now available.

The council reiterated that a solution to the conflict must be in conformity with the Charter of the United Nations and the principles of international law and in that context confirmed:

(a) the sovereignty, territorial integrity and political independence of Bosnia and Herzegovina;
(b) the fact that neither a change in the name of the country nor changes regarding its internal organisation affect membership in the United Nations;
(c) the principles adopted by the London International Conference on the former Yugoslavia, regarding the end of hostilities, the return of refugees and compensation;
(d) the right of all displaced persons to return to their homes;
(e) the preservation of Sarajevo as a multicultural, multiethnic and pluri-religious centre.

The security council recalled that people would be held individually responsible for war crimes and violations of humanitarian law and its decision in Resolution 827 to establish the International Criminal Tribunal for the former Yugoslavia. It concluded by declaring its readiness to assist the parties in implementing a settlement once agreed.

== See also ==
- Bosnian Genocide
- Bosnian War
- Breakup of Yugoslavia
- List of United Nations Security Council Resolutions 801 to 900 (1993–1994)
- Yugoslav Wars
