= United Nations Security Council Resolution 843 =

UN Security Council Resolution 843
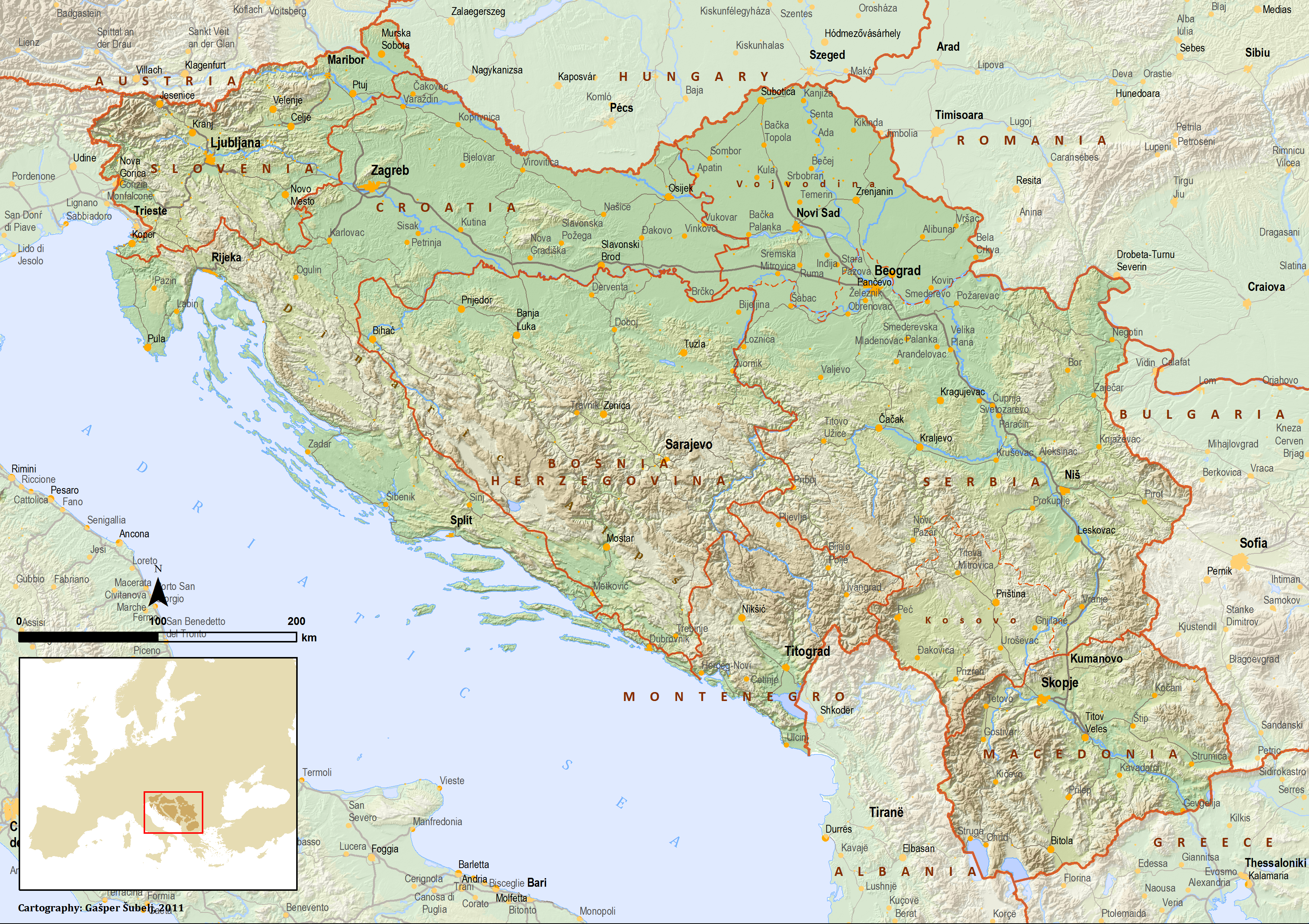
- Former Yugoslavia
- Date: 18 June 1993
- Meeting no.: 3,240
- Code: S/RES/843 (Document)
- Subject: Former Yugoslavia
- Voting summary: 15 voted for; None voted against; None abstained
- Result: Adopted

Security Council composition
- Permanent members: China; France; Russia; United Kingdom; United States
- Non-permanent members: Brazil; Cape Verde; Djibouti; Hungary; Japan; Morocco; New Zealand; Pakistan; Spain; Venezuela

United Nations Security Council resolution 843, adopted unanimously on 18 June 1993, after reaffirming Resolution 724 (1991) and Article 50 of the United Nations Charter, the council was conscious of the fact that an increasing number of requests for assistance have been received under Article 50.

Article 50 states that if any state is affected economically by preventive or enforcement measures undertaken by the security council against another state, the former state has a right to consult the council to find a solution to the problems. The committee established in Resolution 724 was confirmed with carrying out tasks relating to Article 50 and was invited to make recommendations to the President of the Security Council for appropriate action.

== See also ==
- Breakup of Yugoslavia
- List of United Nations Security Council Resolutions 801 to 900 (1993–1994)
- Yugoslav Wars
- List of United Nations Security Council Resolutions related to the conflicts in former Yugoslavia
