= United Nations Security Council Resolution 805 =

UN Security Council Resolution 805
- International Court of Justice
- Date: 4 February 1993
- Meeting no.: 3,170
- Code: S/RES/805 (Document)
- Subject: International Court of Justice
- Voting summary: 15 voted for; None voted against; None abstained
- Result: Adopted

Security Council composition
- Permanent members: China; France; Russia; United Kingdom; United States
- Non-permanent members: Brazil; Cape Verde; Djibouti; Hungary; Japan; Morocco; New Zealand; Pakistan; Spain; Venezuela

United Nations Security Council resolution 805, adopted unanimously on 4 February 1993, after noting the death of International Court of Justice (ICJ) judge Manfred Lachs on 14 January 1993, the Council decided that elections to the vacancy on the ICJ would take place on 10 May 1993 at the Security Council and at a meeting of the General Assembly during its 47th session.

Lachs was a member of the court since 1967, and was its president between 1973 and 1976. His term of office was due to expire in February 1994.

== See also ==
- Judges of the International Court of Justice
- List of United Nations Security Council Resolutions 801 to 900 (1993–1994)
