= United Nations Security Council Resolution 860 =

UN Security Council Resolution 860
- Date: 27 August 1993
- Meeting no.: 3,270
- Code: S/RES/860 (Document)
- Subject: Cambodia
- Voting summary: 15 voted for; None voted against; None abstained
- Result: Adopted

Security Council composition
- Permanent members: China; France; Russia; United Kingdom; United States
- Non-permanent members: Brazil; Cape Verde; Djibouti; Hungary; Japan; Morocco; New Zealand; Pakistan; Spain; Venezuela

United Nations Security Council resolution 860, adopted unanimously on 27 August 1993, after recalling resolutions 668 (1990), 745 (1992), 840 (1993) and other relevant resolutions on Cambodia, the Council confirmed plans for the withdrawal of the United Nations Transitional Authority in Cambodia (UNTAC).

Tributes were paid to the former King Norodom Sihanouk for helping to achieving peace, stability and genuine national reconciliation in the country. The Council recalled that in the Paris Agreements the transitional period would end when the elected Constituent Assembly approved a constitution and transformed itself into a legislative assembly and government. It also noted the request of the Cambodian interim joint administration to maintain UNTAC's mandate until a new government had been formed.

The Council stressed the importance of completing a constitution in accordance with the Paris Agreements, confirming that UNTAC's functions would end upon the creation of a new government in September 1993. It concluded by deciding that the period of withdrawal would end by 15 November 1993, in order to ensure a safe and orderly withdrawal of the military component of UNTAC.

== See also ==
- List of United Nations Security Council Resolutions 801 to 900 (1993–1994)
- Modern Cambodia
- People's Republic of Kampuchea#Transition and State of Cambodia (1989–1992)
