= United Nations Security Council Resolution 877 =

UN Security Council Resolution 877
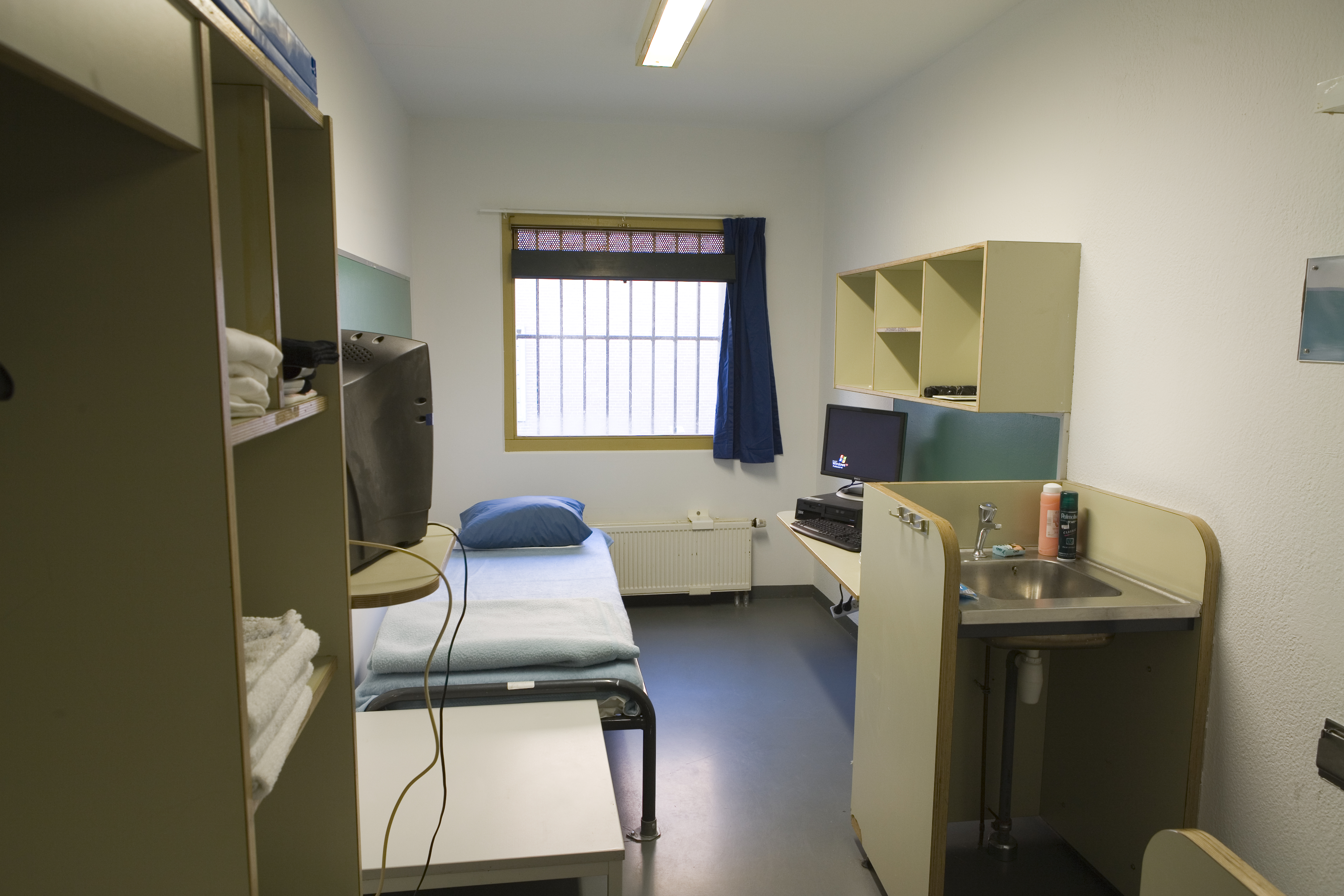
- Detention unit at the ICTY
- Date: 21 October 1993
- Meeting no.: 3,296
- Code: S/RES/877 (Document)
- Subject: Tribunal (Former Yugoslavia)
- Voting summary: 15 voted for; None voted against; None abstained
- Result: Adopted

Security Council composition
- Permanent members: China; France; Russia; United Kingdom; United States
- Non-permanent members: Brazil; Cape Verde; Djibouti; Hungary; Japan; Morocco; New Zealand; Pakistan; Spain; Venezuela

United Nations Security Council resolution 877, adopted unanimously on 21 October 1993, after recalling 808 (1993) and 827 (1993), the Council appointed the nomination by the Secretary-General Boutros Boutros-Ghali of Mr. Ramón Escovar Salom for the position of Prosecutor at the International Criminal Tribunal for the former Yugoslavia (ICTY).

== See also ==
- Bosnian War
- Breakup of Yugoslavia
- Croatian War of Independence
- List of United Nations Security Council Resolutions 801 to 900 (1993–1994)
- Yugoslav Wars
- List of United Nations Security Council Resolutions related to the conflicts in former Yugoslavia
