= United Nations Security Council Resolution 838 =

UN Security Council Resolution 838
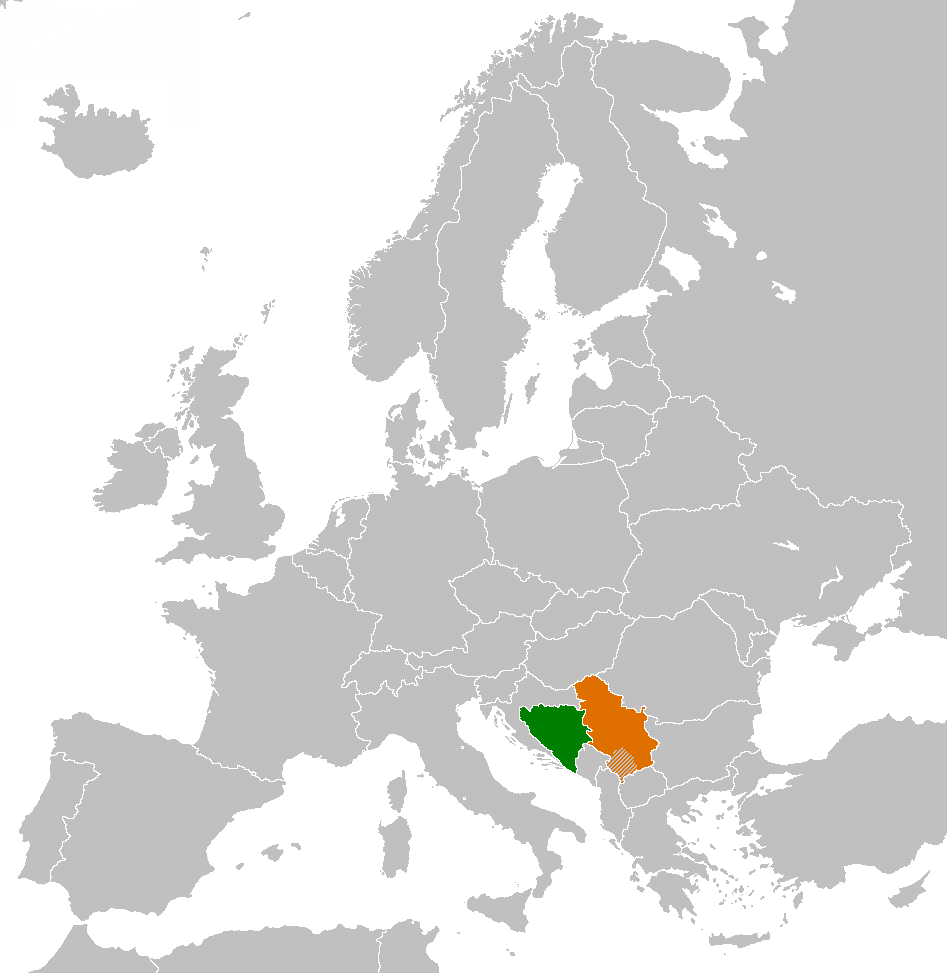
- Bosnia and Herzegovina (green) and Serbia (orange)
- Date: 10 June 1993
- Meeting no.: 3,234
- Code: S/RES/838 (Document)
- Subject: Bosnia and Herzegovina
- Voting summary: 15 voted for; None voted against; None abstained
- Result: Adopted

Security Council composition
- Permanent members: China; France; Russia; United Kingdom; United States
- Non-permanent members: Brazil; Cape Verde; Djibouti; Hungary; Japan; Morocco; New Zealand; Pakistan; Spain; Venezuela

United Nations Security Council resolution 838, adopted unanimously on 10 June 1993, after reaffirming Resolution 713 (1991) and all subsequent resolutions on the situation in the former Yugoslavia and in particular Bosnia and Herzegovina, the Council discussed options for the deployment of international observers on the borders of Bosnia and Herzegovina to ensure implementation of previous Security Council resolutions.

The Council reiterated its demands in resolutions 752 (1992) and 819 (1993) which called for the end of foreign interference in Bosnia and Herzegovina and for the Federal Republic of Yugoslavia (Serbia and Montenegro) cease supplying arms and military equipment to Bosnian Serb paramilitary units respectively. Violations of resolutions 757 (1992), 787 (1992) and 820 (1993) were condemned which involved actions that took place between Serbia and Montenegro and the protected areas in Croatia and those areas of Bosnia and Herzegovina under the control of Bosnian Serbs. In this regard, the Council considered the possible deployment of observers around the borders of Bosnia and Herzegovina as indicated in Resolution 787 (1992).

The resolution also noted the decision of Serbia and Montenegro to prohibit all but humanitarian supplies to Bosnian Serb paramilitaries and the Council urged the country to implement the commitment. The Vance-Owen Peace Plan was recommended as a peaceful settlement of the conflict in the region.

The Secretary-General Boutros Boutros-Ghali was requested to report back to the Security Council on options for the deployment of international observers to monitor the borders of Bosnia and Herzegovina with priority for its border with Serbia and Montenegro. He was requested to contact Member States in order to ensure the availability of any material derived from aerial surveillance.

== See also ==
- Bosnian Genocide
- Bosnian War
- Breakup of Yugoslavia
- Croatian War of Independence
- List of United Nations Security Council Resolutions 801 to 900 (1993–1994)
- Yugoslav Wars
