= United Nations Security Council Resolution 807 =

UN Security Council Resolution 807
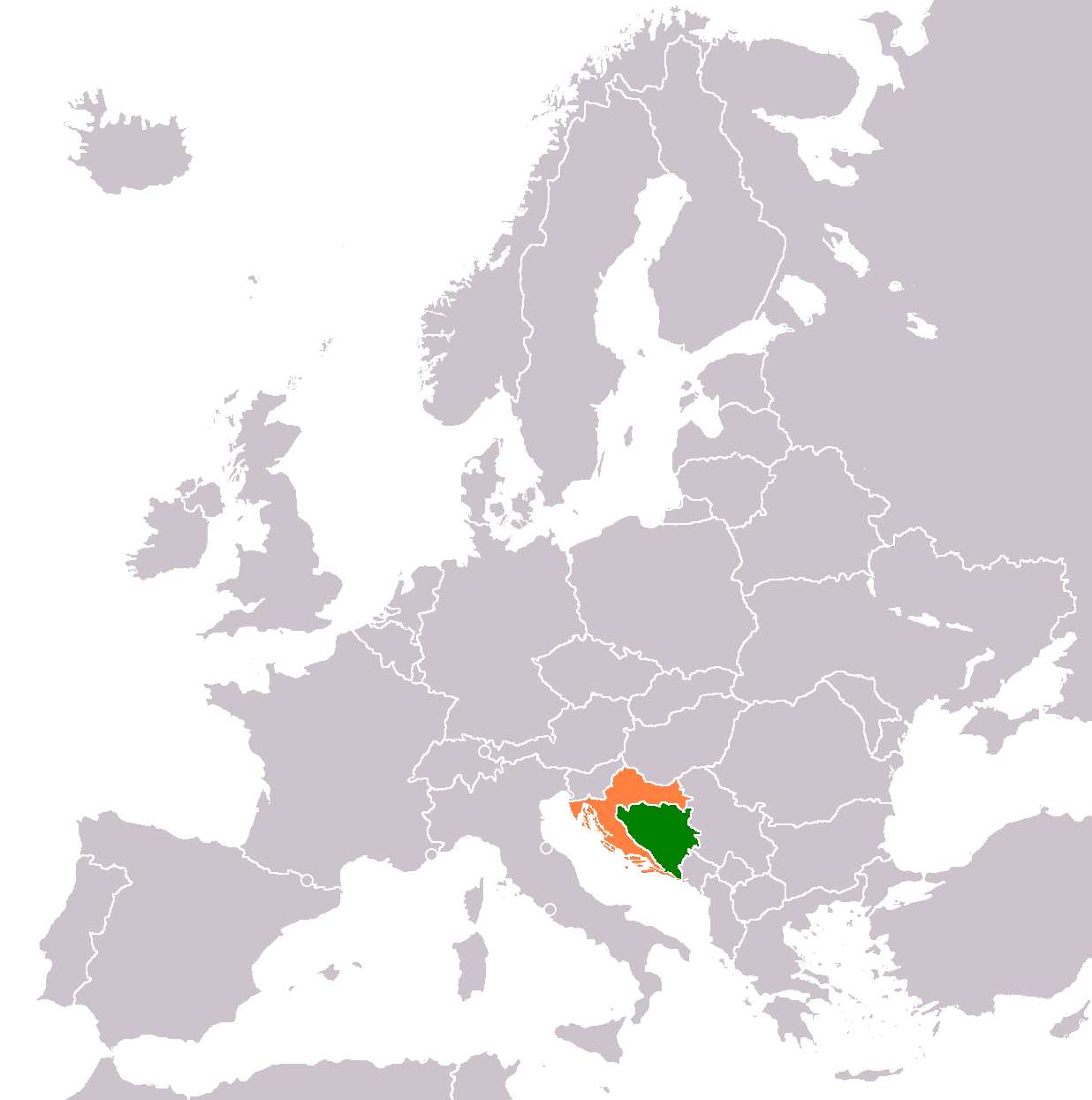
- Bosnia and Herzegovina (green) and Croatia (orange)
- Date: 19 February 1993
- Meeting no.: 3,174
- Code: S/RES/807 (Document)
- Subject: Croatia
- Voting summary: 15 voted for; None voted against; None abstained
- Result: Adopted

Security Council composition
- Permanent members: China; France; Russia; United Kingdom; United States
- Non-permanent members: Brazil; Cape Verde; Djibouti; Hungary; Japan; Morocco; New Zealand; Pakistan; Spain; Venezuela

United Nations Security Council resolution 807, adopted unanimously on 19 February 1993, after reaffirming Resolution 743 (1992) and all subsequent relevant resolutions concerning the United Nations Protection Force (UNPROFOR), the Council determined that the situation in Bosnia and Herzegovina and Croatia continued to constitute a threat to international peace and security and therefore extended the mandate of UNPROFOR for an interim period ending 31 March 1993.

The current resolution demanded that all parties and others concerned co-operate with UNPROFOR and adhere to commitments to the ceasefire, as well as asking parties not to position their forces close to UNPROFOR units or in the United Nations Protected Areas (UNPAs) and pink zones. It also demanded that all the parties respect the freedom of movement of the United Nations peacekeepers so it can carry out necessary operations.

The council concluded by urging the parties to co-operate with the Co-Chairmen of the Steering Committee of the International Conference on the Former Yugoslavia; invited the Secretary-General Boutros Boutros-Ghali to ensure rapid implementation of Resolution 802 (1993), including proposals to increase the strength and a further extension of UNPROFOR's mandate.

== See also ==
- Breakup of Yugoslavia
- Bosnian War
- Croatian War of Independence
- List of United Nations Security Council Resolutions 801 to 900 (1993–1994)
- Republic of Serbian Krajina
- Yugoslav Wars
- List of United Nations Security Council Resolutions related to the conflicts in former Yugoslavia
