= United Nations Security Council Resolution 828 =

UN Security Council Resolution 828
- Location of Eritrea
- Date: 26 May 1993
- Meeting no.: 3,218
- Code: S/RES/828 (Document)
- Subject: Admission of new Members to the UN: Eritrea
- Result: Adopted

Security Council composition
- Permanent members: China; France; Russia; United Kingdom; United States
- Non-permanent members: Brazil; Cape Verde; Djibouti; Hungary; Japan; Morocco; New Zealand; Pakistan; Spain; Venezuela

United Nations Security Council resolution 828, adopted without a vote on 26 May 1993, after examining the application of Eritrea for membership in the United Nations, the Council recommended to the General Assembly that Eritrea be admitted.

== See also ==
- Member states of the United Nations
- List of United Nations Security Council Resolutions 801 to 900 (1993–1994)
