= United Nations Security Council Resolution 855 =

UN Security Council Resolution 855
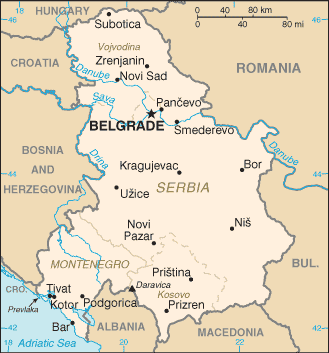
- Serbia and Montenegro
- Date: 9 August 1993
- Meeting no.: 3,262
- Code: S/RES/855 (Document)
- Subject: Federal Republic of Yugoslavia
- Voting summary: 14 voted for; None voted against; 1 abstained
- Result: Adopted

Security Council composition
- Permanent members: China; France; Russia; United Kingdom; United States
- Non-permanent members: Brazil; Cape Verde; Djibouti; Hungary; Japan; Morocco; New Zealand; Pakistan; Spain; Venezuela

United Nations Security Council resolution 855, adopted on 9 August 1993, after reaffirming resolutions at putting an end to the conflict in the former Yugoslavia and hearing representations from the Organization for Security and Co-operation in Europe (OSCE) and the Federal Republic of Yugoslavia (Serbia and Montenegro), the council called upon Serbia and Montenegro to reconsider its refusal to allow OSCE missions in its territory.

The OSCE missions were noted as an example of preventive diplomacy which had greatly contributed to promoting stability and counteracting the risk of violence in Kosovo, Sandžak and Vojvodina. The council was determined to avoid any extension of the conflict in the former Yugoslavia and attached importance to the international community monitoring the situation in Kosovo, Sandžak and Vojvodina.

Urging Serbia and Montenegro to reconsider its decision, it recommended co-operation with the OSCE so that steps could be taken to resume monitoring and agree to an increase in the number of monitors. The resolution concluded by calling on the authorities in Serbia and Montenegro to ensure the safety and security of the monitors and allow them unimpeded access necessary to complete their mission.

Resolution 855 was adopted by 14 votes to none, with one abstention from China.

== See also ==
- Bosnian War
- Breakup of Yugoslavia
- Croatian War of Independence
- List of United Nations Security Council Resolutions 801 to 900 (1993–1994)
- Yugoslav Wars
- List of United Nations Security Council Resolutions related to the conflicts in former Yugoslavia
