= United Nations Security Council Resolution 844 =

UN Security Council Resolution 844
- Military medal of UNPROFOR
- Date: 18 June 1993
- Meeting no.: 3,241
- Code: S/RES/844 (Document)
- Subject: Bosnia and Herzegovina
- Voting summary: 15 voted for; None voted against; None abstained
- Result: Adopted

Security Council composition
- Permanent members: China; France; Russia; United Kingdom; United States
- Non-permanent members: Brazil; Cape Verde; Djibouti; Hungary; Japan; Morocco; New Zealand; Pakistan; Spain; Venezuela

United Nations Security Council resolution 844, adopted unanimously on 18 June 1993, after reaffirming Resolution 713 (1991) and subsequent resolutions, the Council noted deteriorating situation in Bosnia and Herzegovina and authorised a reinforcement of the United Nations Protection Force (UNPROFOR).

Acting under Chapter VII of the United Nations Charter and reiterating its alarm at violations of international humanitarian law, an additional 7,600 personnel were sent to supplement UNPROFOR in accordance with a report of the Secretary-General Boutros Boutros-Ghali pursuant to Resolution 836 (1993). Further calls for additional personnel from Member States were also made, and for equipment and logistical support.

The decision to use air power in and around the safe areas of Tuzla, Žepa, Bihać, Goražde, Sarajevo and Srebrenica in order to provide assistance to UNPROFOR was reaffirmed, urging Member States to co-operate with the Secretary-General on the matter.

== See also ==
- Bosnian War
- Breakup of Yugoslavia
- List of United Nations Security Council Resolutions 801 to 900 (1993–1994)
- Yugoslav Wars
- List of United Nations Security Council Resolutions related to the conflicts in former Yugoslavia
