= United Nations Security Council Resolution 900 =

UN Security Council Resolution 900
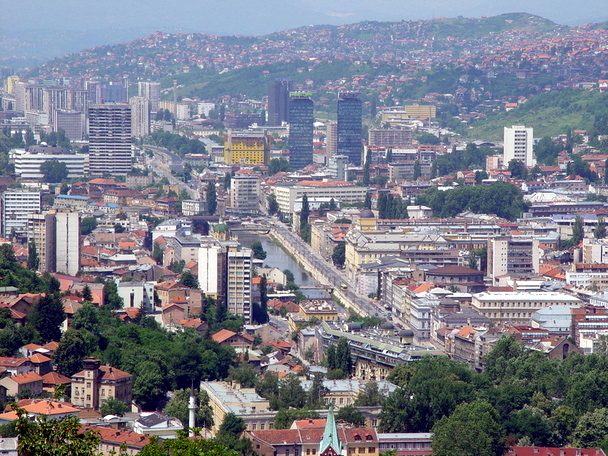
- Sarajevo
- Date: 4 March 1994
- Meeting no.: 3,344
- Code: S/RES/900 (Document)
- Subject: Bosnia and Herzegovina
- Voting summary: 15 voted for; None voted against; None abstained
- Result: Adopted

Security Council composition
- Permanent members: China; France; Russia; United Kingdom; United States
- Non-permanent members: Argentina; Brazil; Czech Republic; Djibouti; New Zealand; Nigeria; Oman; Pakistan; Rwanda; Spain

United Nations Security Council resolution 900, adopted on 4 March 1994, after reaffirming all resolutions on the situation in Bosnia and Herzegovina, the Council discussed the restoration of essential public services and normal life in and around the capital Sarajevo.

The Security Council noted positive developments around Sarajevo as a first step towards restoring peace in Bosnia and Herzegovina. There was an agreement between Bosnia and Herzegovina, the Bosnian Serbs and the Secretary-General's Special Representative on a ceasefire and heavy weapons which was welcomed, given the measures taken in resolutions 824 (1993) and 836 (1993). It was crucial that citizens and humanitarian relief could move freely and that normal life could be resumed. The United Kingdom and the United States therefore sent a joint mission to Sarajevo to assess the restoration process. The council stated the city of Sarajevo was important as the capital of Bosnia and Herzegovina and as a multicultural, multiethnic, and religious centre.

Furthermore, the resolution welcomed the rotation of the United Nations Protection Force's staff in Srebrenica and the reopening of Tuzla International Airport. There was concern also for the deteriorating situation in Maglaj, Mostar and Vitez. The council also stressed the importance of the observance of international humanitarian law.

All parties were called to co-operate with UNPROFOR with regard to the ceasefire around Sarajevo and to work to help with restore normal life in the city. The Secretary-General Boutros Boutros-Ghali was asked to appoint a senior civilian official to draw up an action plan for the restoration of public services in the Sarajevo area, excluding Pale. He was also requested to establish a voluntary trust fund for which countries could contribute to. Within a week he was required to report on ways to achieve the aforementioned objectives and the costs involved, and to report in 10 days on developments relating to the protection of Maglaj, Mostar and Vitez.

== See also ==
- Bosnian Genocide
- Bosnian War
- Breakup of Yugoslavia
- Croatian War of Independence
- List of United Nations Security Council Resolutions 801 to 900 (1993–1994)
- Yugoslav Wars
