= United Nations Security Council Resolution 882 =

UN Security Council Resolution 882
- Flag of Mozambique
- Date: 5 November 1993
- Meeting no.: 3,305
- Code: S/RES/882 (Document)
- Subject: The situation in Mozambique
- Voting summary: 15 voted for; None voted against; None abstained
- Result: Adopted

Security Council composition
- Permanent members: China; France; Russia; United Kingdom; United States
- Non-permanent members: Brazil; Cape Verde; Djibouti; Hungary; Japan; Morocco; New Zealand; Pakistan; Spain; Venezuela

United Nations Security Council resolution 882, adopted unanimously on 5 November 1993, after reaffirming resolutions 782 (1992) and subsequent resolutions on Mozambique, the council noted, in addition to positive developments in the country, that some aspects of the Rome General Peace Accords had not been implemented.

The council urged the Government of Mozambique and RENAMO to fully implement the peace accords, affirming that it would contribute to peace and stability in the region. The indirect talks held by the presidents of both parties satisfied the council. The efforts of the Secretary-General Boutros Boutros-Ghali, his special representative and the personnel of the United Nations Operation in Mozambique (ONUMOZ) were welcomed. At the same time, delays in implementing the accords caused concern, as did the unacceptability of attempts to gain more time or further concessions by either party.

Importance was attached to elections that were to be held by October 1994, welcoming the approval by the Mozambican parties of the revised timetable for the implementation of the peace accords. The parties were urged to commence assembly of troops in November 1993 and to initiate demobilisation by January 1994 with a view to completing of the process by May 1994. The formation of the Mozambican Defense Force and the full-scale training in Nyanga, Zimbabwe of troops from the Government and RENAMO. Guidelines for the Ceasefire Commission governing the movement of troops after the signature of the Peace Agreement were approved, underlining the need to establish the National Commission for Administration, the National Police Affairs Commission (COMPOL) and the Commission for Information (COMINFO).

The secretary-general was authorised to deploy 128 United Nations police observers approved in Resolution 797 (1992) and it was important that the parties:

(a) approve an electoral law and establish an election commission by 30 November 1993;
(b) concentrate troops in assembly areas;
(c) demobilise half of troops by 31 March 1994;
(d) complete integration of forces by August 1994.

The mandate of ONUMOZ was extended for a further six months until 5 May 1994, with the mandate being reviewed after 90 days on the basis of a report by the secretary-general due by 31 January 1994 and every three months thereafter, concerning developments in the peace process. Finally, the international community was urged to provide appropriate and prompt assistance for the implementation of the humanitarian programme provided for by the Peace Accords. The parties were urged not to impede this process, urging co-operation with the UNHCR and the resettlement of refugees and displaced persons.

== See also ==
- History of Mozambique
- List of United Nations Security Council Resolutions 801 to 900 (1993–1994)
- Mozambican Civil War
