= List of United Nations Security Council Resolutions 801 to 900 =

This is a list of United Nations Security Council Resolutions 801 to 900 adopted between 8 January 1993 and 4 March 1994.

Resolution	Date	Vote	Concerns
801	8 January 1993	Adopted without vote	Admission of the Czech Republic to the United Nations
802	25 January 1993	15–0–0	Croatian Army actions in the United Nations Protected Areas in Croatia
803	28 January 1993	15–0–0	Extends mandate of the United Nations Interim Force in Lebanon
804	29 January 1993	15–0–0	Extends mandate of the United Nations Angola Verification Mission II, demands ceasefire
805	4 February 1993	15–0–0	Election of members to the International Court of Justice
806	5 February 1993	15–0–0	Militarises the United Nations Iraq–Kuwait Observation Mission after Iraqi incursions
807	19 February 1993	15–0–0	Extends mandate of the United Nations Protection Force
808	22 February 1993	15–0–0	Proposals for the establishment of the International Criminal Tribunal for the former Yugoslavia
809	2 March 1993	15–0–0	Settlement Plan for Western Sahara
810	8 March 1993	15–0–0	Elections to the Constituent Assembly in Cambodia
811	12 March 1993	15–0–0	Demands ceasefire in Angolan Civil War, organisation of meeting between government and UNITA
812	12 March 1993	15–0–0	Political settlement in Rwanda
813	26 March 1993	15–0–0	Implementation of peace process in Liberia amid First Liberian Civil War
814	26 March 1993	15–0–0	Expands size and mandate of the United Nations Operation in Somalia II
815	30 March 1993	15–0–0	Extends mandate of the United Nations Protection Force
816	31 March 1993	14–0–1 (abstention: China)	Extends ban on military flights over Bosnia and Herzegovina
817	7 April 1993	15–0–0	Admission of the Republic of Macedonia to the United Nations as the "former Yugoslav Republic of Macedonia"
818	14 April 1993	15–0–0	Implementation of the Rome General Peace Accords in Mozambique
819	16 April 1993	15–0–0	Demands that Srebrenica and the surrounding areas in Bosnia and Herzegovina be treated as a safe area
820	17 April 1993	13–0–2 (abstentions: China, Russia)	Peace plan for Bosnia and Herzegovina, further sanctions on the Federal Republic of Yugoslavia
821	28 April 1993	13–0–2 (abstentions: China, Russia)	Non-participation of Yugoslavia in the work of the United Nations Economic and Social Council
822	30 April 1993	15–0–0	First Nagorno-Karabakh War between Armenia and Azerbaijan
823	30 April 1993	15–0–0	Extends mandate of the United Nations Angola Verification Mission II
824	6 May 1993	15–0–0	Treatment of certain towns and surroundings in Bosnia and Herzegovina as safe areas
825	11 May 1993	13–0–2 (abstentions: China, Pakistan)	North Korea's decision to withdraw from the Treaty on the Non-Proliferation of Nuclear Weapons
826	20 May 1993	15–0–0	Elections for the Constituent Assembly in Cambodia
827	25 May 1993	15–0–0	Establishes the International Criminal Tribunal for the former Yugoslavia
828	26 May 1993	Adopted without vote	Admission of Eritrea to the United Nations
829	26 May 1993	Adopted without vote	Admission of Monaco to the United Nations
830	26 May 1993	15–0–0	Extends mandate of the United Nations Disengagement Observer Force
831	27 May 1993	14–0–1 (abstention: Pakistan)	Mandate, financing and restructuring of the United Nations Peacekeeping Force in Cyprus
832	27 May 1993	15–0–0	Enlarges mandate of the United Nations Observer Mission in El Salvador
833	27 May 1993	15–0–0	Demarcation of the Iraq-Kuwait boundary
834	1 June 1993	15–0–0	Extends mandate of the United Nations Angola Verification Mission II, peace process
835	2 June 1993	15–0–0	Completion of elections to the Constituent Assembly in Cambodia
836	4 June 1993	13–0–2 (abstentions: Pakistan, Venezuela)	Extends mandate of the United Nations Protection Force, use of "necessary measures" to protect safe areas
837	6 June 1993	15–0–0	Condemns attacks on the United Nations Operation in Somalia II
838	10 June 1993	15–0–0	Options for deployment of international observers on the borders of Bosnia and Herzegovina
839	11 June 1993	15–0–0	Extends mandate of the United Nations Peacekeeping Force in Cyprus
840	15 June 1993	15–0–0	Results of elections to the Constituent Assembly in Cambodia
841	16 June 1993	15–0–0	Sanctions against Haiti due to Raoul Cédras' military government
842	18 June 1993	15–0–0	Contribution of additional personnel to United Nations Protection Force in the Republic of Macedonia
843	18 June 1993	15–0–0	Confirms the committee established by 724 (1991) is entrusted with examining requests for assistance
844	18 June 1993	15–0–0	Authorisation of the reinforcement of the United Nations Protection Force
845	18 June 1993	15–0–0	Settlement of the naming dispute between Greece and the Republic of Macedonia
846	22 June 1993	15–0–0	Establishes the United Nations Observer Mission Uganda–Rwanda
847	30 June 1993	15–0–0	Extends mandate of the United Nations Protection Force and situation in Croatia
848	8 July 1993	Adopted without vote	Admission of the Principality of Andorra to the United Nations
849	9 July 1993	15–0–0	Implementation of ceasefire, dispatch of military observers to Abkhazia, Georgia during the war
850	9 July 1993	15–0–0	Implementation of the Rome General Peace Accords and formation of new armed forces in Mozambique
851	15 July 1993	15–0–0	Extends mandate of the United Nations Angola Verification Mission II, peace process
852	28 July 1993	15–0–0	Extends mandate of the United Nations Interim Force in Lebanon
853	29 July 1993	15–0–0	Seizure of the district of Aghdam and other recently occupied areas of Azerbaijan during Summer Offensives
854	6 August 1993	15–0–0	Deployment of an advance team of United Nations military observers during Abkhazia war
855	9 August 1993	14–0–1 (abstention: China)	Serbia and Montenegro's refusal to allow Organization for Security and Co-operation in Europe special missions in Kosovo, Sandjak and Vojvodina
856	10 August 1993	15–0–0	Proposed establishment of the United Nations Observer Mission in Liberia, dispatches military observers during civil war
857	20 August 1993	15–0–0	Nominations of judges for the International Criminal Tribunal for the former Yugoslavia
858	24 August 1993	15–0–0	Establishes the United Nations Observer Mission in Georgia
859	24 August 1993	15–0–0	Comprehensive political settlement of the war in Bosnia and Herzegovina
860	27 August 1993	15–0–0	Withdrawal of the United Nations Transitional Authority in Cambodia
861	27 August 1993	15–0–0	Suspension of sanctions against Haiti
862	31 August 1993	15–0–0	Proposed United Nations Mission in Haiti and dispatch of an advance team to Haiti
863	13 September 1993	15–0–0	Implementation of the provisions of the Rome General Peace Accords for Mozambique
864	15 September 1993	15–0–0	Extends mandate of the United Nations Angola Verification Mission II, oil embargo against UNITA
865	22 September 1993	15–0–0	Process of national reconciliation and political settlement in Somalia
866	22 September 1993	15–0–0	Establishes United Nations Observer Mission in Liberia, implementation of peace agreements
867	23 September 1993	15–0–0	Establishes the United Nations Mission in Haiti
868	29 September 1993	15–0–0	Establishes new safety mandates for United Nations peacekeepers
869	30 September 1993	15–0–0	Extends mandate of the United Nations Protection Force
870	1 October 1993	15–0–0	Extends mandate of the United Nations Protection Force
871	4 October 1993	15–0–0	Extends mandate of the United Nations Protection Force, peacekeeping plan for Croatia
872	5 October 1993	15–0–0	Establishes the United Nations Assistance Mission for Rwanda
873	13 October 1993	15–0–0	Terminates suspension of sanctions against Haiti
874	14 October 1993	15–0–0	Settlement of the First Nagorno-Karabakh War
875	16 October 1993	15–0–0	Sanctions against Haiti
876	19 October 1993	15–0–0	Violation of ceasefire in Abkhazia war, killing of Chairman of the Defence Council
877	21 October 1993	Adopted without vote	Appoints Ramón Escovar-Salom as Prosecutor at the International Criminal Tribunal for the former Yugoslavia
878	29 October 1993	15–0–0	Extends mandate of the United Nations Operation in Somalia II
879	29 October 1993	15–0–0	Extends mandate of the United Nations Operation in Mozambique
880	4 November 1993	15–0–0	Transitional period in Cambodia following the withdrawal of the United Nations Transitional Authority in Cambodia
881	4 November 1993	15–0–0	Extends mandate of the United Nations Observer Mission in Georgia
882	5 November 1993	15–0–0	Extends the United Nations Operation in Mozambique, implementation of the Rome General Peace Accords
883	11 November 1993	11–0–4 (abstentions: China, Djibouti, Morocco, Pakistan)	Sanctions against Libya for lack of cooperation with resolutions 731 (1992) and 748 (1992)
884	12 November 1993	15–0–0	Conflict in and around Nagorno-Karabakh
885	16 November 1993	15–0–0	Establishes Commission of Inquiry regarding attacks on the United Nations Operation in Somalia II
886	18 November 1993	15–0–0	Extends mandate of the United Nations Operation in Somalia II, national reconciliation in Somalia
887	29 November 1993	15–0–0	Extends mandate of the United Nations Disengagement Observer Force
888	30 November 1993	15–0–0	Extends mandate of the United Nations Observer Mission in El Salvador, implementation of peace agreements
889	15 December 1993	15–0–0	Extends mandate of the United Nations Peacekeeping Force in Cyprus, implementation of "Set of Ideas"
890	15 December 1993	15–0–0	Extends mandate of the United Nations Angola Verification Mission II, settlement of Angolan Civil War
891	20 December 1993	15–0–0	Extends mandate of the United Nations Observer Mission Uganda–Rwanda
892	22 December 1993	15–0–0	Phased deployment of additional military observers to the United Nations Observer Mission in Georgia
893	6 January 1994	15–0–0	United Nations Assistance Mission for Rwanda deployment, implementation of the Arusha Peace Agreement
894	14 January 1994	15–0–0	Participation of the United Nations and international observers in the South African general election
895	28 January 1994	15–0–0	Extends mandate of the United Nations Interim Force in Lebanon
896	31 January 1994	15–0–0	Possible establishment of peacekeeping force in Abkhazia, Georgia; political settlement of the Abkhazia conflict
897	4 February 1994	15–0–0	Continuation of the United Nations Operation in Somalia II; national reconciliation, political settlement in Somalia
898	23 February 1994	15–0–0	Establishes police component of the United Nations Operation in Mozambique, peace accords
899	4 March 1994	15–0–0	Compensation to Iraqi private citizens with assets in Kuwaiti territory following boundary demaracation
900	4 March 1994	15–0–0	Restoration of essential public services and normal life in and around Sarajevo in Bosnia and Herzegovina

== See also ==
- Lists of United Nations Security Council resolutions
- List of United Nations Security Council Resolutions 701 to 800
- List of United Nations Security Council Resolutions 901 to 1000
