= United Nations Security Council Resolution 824 =

UN Security Council Resolution 824
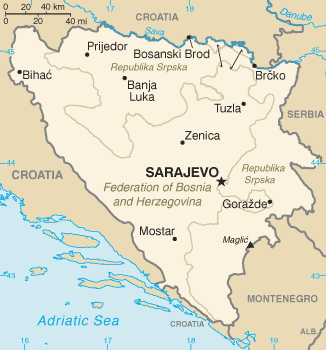
- Bosnia and Herzegovina
- Date: 6 May 1993
- Meeting no.: 3,208
- Code: S/RES/824 (Document)
- Subject: Bosnia and Herzegovina
- Voting summary: 15 voted for; None voted against; None abstained
- Result: Adopted

Security Council composition
- Permanent members: China; France; Russia; United Kingdom; United States
- Non-permanent members: Brazil; Cape Verde; Djibouti; Hungary; Japan; Morocco; New Zealand; Pakistan; Spain; Venezuela

United Nations Security Council resolution 824, adopted unanimously on 6 May 1993, after considering a report by the Secretary-General Boutros Boutros-Ghali pursuant to Resolution 819 (1993), the council discussed the treatment of certain towns and surroundings as "safe areas" in Bosnia and Herzegovina.

The practice of ethnic cleansing was again condemned in addition to the obstruction of humanitarian aid to affected areas, while the council expressed concern at the large displacement of people in the region. Attacks by Bosnian Serb paramilitaries on several Bosnian towns also drew the concern of the security council. It indicated that the unique character of the city of Sarajevo as a multicultural, multi-ethnic and pluri-religious centre which exemplified the viability of coexistence and interrelations between all the communities in Bosnia and Herzegovina, and of the need to preserve it and avoid its further destruction

Acting under Chapter VII of the United Nations Charter and recalling the provisions of Resolution 815 (1993) on the mandate of the United Nations Protection Force (UNPROFOR), the resolution demanded that the taking of territory by force cease. It also declared that Sarajevo, Tuzla, Žepa, Goražde, Bihać, as well as Srebrenica, be treated as safe areas by all parties concerned, free from hostile attacks. The council also demanded that the attacks stop and Bosnian Serb forces withdraw, and allow for unimpeded access by UNPROFOR and international organisations. However, there was no mention of enforcement measures if the provisions were not implemented.

The strength of UNPROFOR was increased by an additional 50 military observers along with military equipment and logistical support, demanding all parties co-operate with the peacekeeping force. The Secretary-General was also asked to monitor the humanitarian situation in Bosnia and Herzegovina.

Resolution 824 concluded by declaring that further measures would be taken if there was a failure by any party to implement the current resolution and that the provisions of the current resolution would remain in force until hostilities ceased, troops separated and the supervision of heavy weaponry was in place.

== See also ==
- Bosnian War
- Breakup of Yugoslavia
- List of United Nations Security Council Resolutions 801 to 900 (1993–1994)
- Yugoslav Wars
- List of United Nations Security Council Resolutions related to the conflicts in former Yugoslavia
