= United Nations Security Council Resolution 886 =

UN Security Council Resolution 886
- Flag of Somalia
- Date: 18 November 1993
- Meeting no.: 3,317
- Code: S/RES/886 (Document)
- Subject: Somalia
- Voting summary: 15 voted for; None voted against; None abstained
- Result: Adopted

Security Council composition
- Permanent members: China; France; Russia; United Kingdom; United States
- Non-permanent members: Brazil; Cape Verde; Djibouti; Hungary; Japan; Morocco; New Zealand; Pakistan; Spain; Venezuela

United Nations Security Council resolution 886, adopted unanimously on 18 November 1993, after reaffirming resolutions 733 (1992) and all of its subsequent resolutions on Somalia, the council discussed the situation in the country and renewed the mandate of the United Nations Operation in Somalia II (UNOSOM II) until 31 May 1994.

The security council noted the strong improvement of the situation in most regions of Somalia by UNOSOM II, acknowledging that the Somali people themselves were responsible for the reconciliation and reconstruction of their country, the highest priority for UNOSOM II, but stressed that the international community wanted to assist in the process. The general agreement signed on 8 January 1993 in Addis Ababa and the Addis Ababa Agreement of the Conference on National Reconciliation on 27 March, for the council, provided a solid basis for a solution. In that context, disarmament was crucial to peace and stability, though the council condemned the continuing violence and attacks on peacekeepers and aid workers and the situation as a whole remained a threat to peace and security in the region.

The Secretary-General Boutros Boutros-Ghali was requested to report to the security council by 15 January 1994 on developments and an updated plan with the future strategy of the mission, with the council deciding to undertake a review of the UNOSOM II mission by 1 February 1994 after receiving the report.

All parties, factions and movements in Somalia were called to abide by the ceasefire and disarmament agreements and accelerate their efforts to achieve political reconciliation. It was important in this regard that concrete goals had to be achieved, including the creation of district and regional councils and an interim national authority. Additionally, the establishment of an operational police and legal system was important to this process. The parties were reminded that the further involvement of the United Nations depended on their co-operation to find a solution. The diplomatic efforts of the Member States and international organisations to include all factions to the negotiating table was praised.

The council reaffirmed that all countries should continue to observe the arms embargo against Somalia imposed in Resolution 733 (1992) while expressing concern at the destabilising effects of cross-border arms flows in the region in relation to the security of other countries. The council stressed the link between rehabilitation and reconciliation, and encouraged donors to continue contributing to rehabilitation projects in areas where security and reconciliation were brought about. States were also encouraged to provide more troops, equipment, money to the process of national reconciliation in Somalia and asked for support to strengthen UNOSUM II.

== See also ==
- History of Somalia
- List of United Nations Security Council Resolutions 801 to 900 (1993–1994)
- Somali Civil War
