= United Nations Security Council Resolution 826 =

UN Security Council Resolution 826
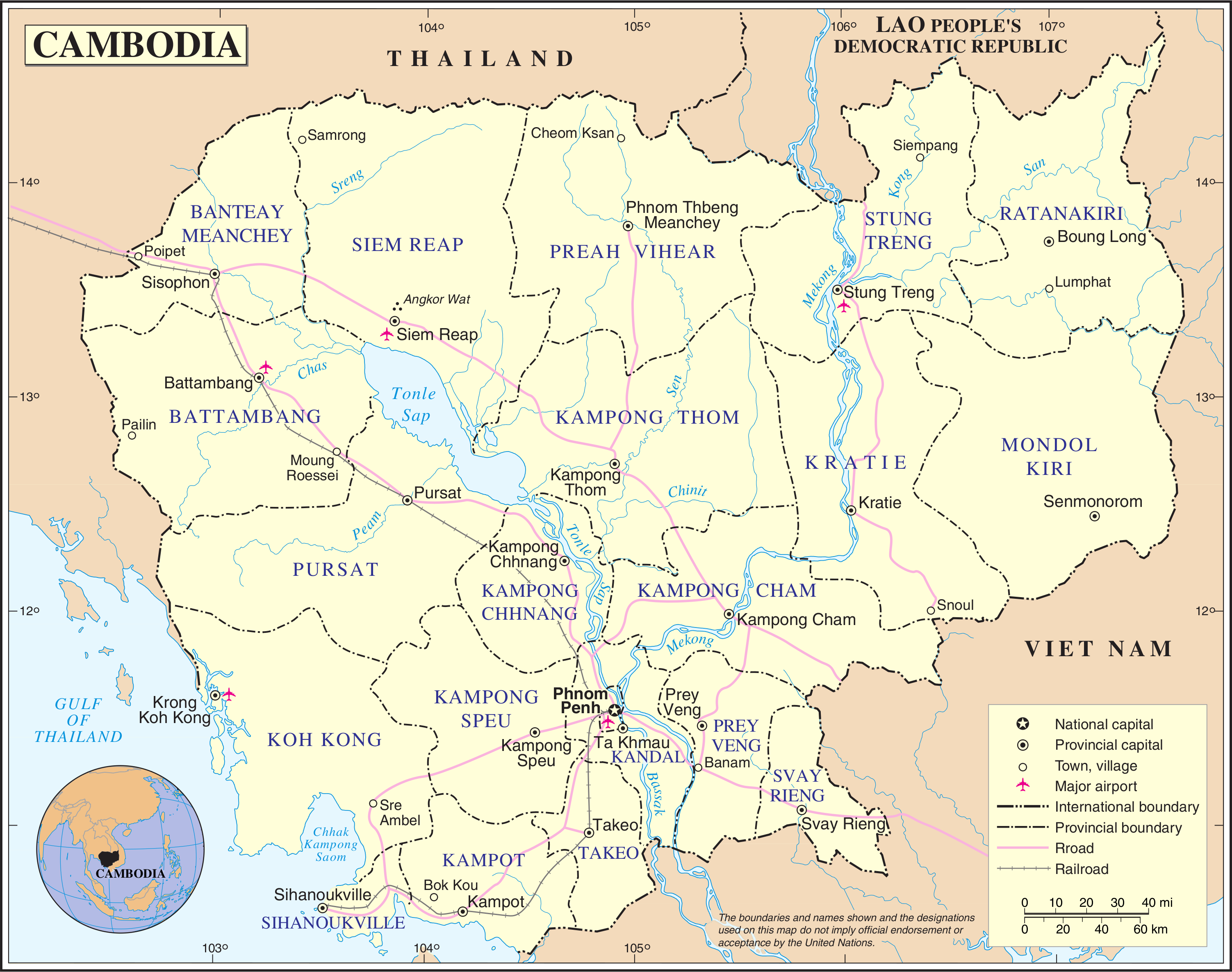
- Cambodia
- Date: 20 May 1993
- Meeting no.: 3,213
- Code: S/RES/826 (Document)
- Subject: The situation in Cambodia
- Voting summary: 15 voted for; None voted against; None abstained
- Result: Adopted

Security Council composition
- Permanent members: China; France; Russia; United Kingdom; United States
- Non-permanent members: Brazil; Cape Verde; Djibouti; Hungary; Japan; Morocco; New Zealand; Pakistan; Spain; Venezuela

United Nations Security Council resolution 826, adopted unanimously on 20 May 1993, after recalling resolutions 668 (1990), 745 (1992) and 810 (1993), the council supported the five million Cambodians who registered to vote despite violence and intimidation and discussed further preparations for the upcoming elections.

Approving a report by the Secretary-General Boutros Boutros-Ghali, the council expressed support for the preparations by the United Nations Transitional Authority in Cambodia (UNTAC), demanding all parties abide by the Paris Agreements and co-operate with UNTAC. It also condemned non-cooperation with the Paris Agreements and interference and attacks on UNTAC personnel, expressing support for the latter's measures taken to protect its personnel.

Support was given to the efforts of UNTAC in preparation for the elections, calling on it to ensure a neutral political environment conducive to the holding of free and fair elections and announcing its intention to endorse the results of the election provided they are free and fair. The resolution also warned that a failure of any of the parties to comply with their obligations would result in further measures from the council, realising that they have full responsibility to implement the Paris Agreements.

The resolution concluded by requesting the secretary-general to report on the holding and results of the election, the conduct of the parties and any new measures if necessary to ensure compliance by the parties.

== See also ==
- List of United Nations Security Council Resolutions 801 to 900 (1993–1994)
- Modern Cambodia
- Transition of the People's Republic of Kampuchea to Cambodia
