= United Nations Security Council Resolution 846 =

UN Security Council Resolution 846
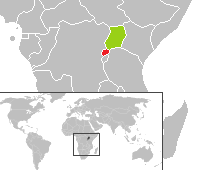
- Rwanda (red) and Uganda (green)
- Date: 22 June 1993
- Meeting no.: 3,244
- Code: S/RES/846 (Document)
- Subject: Rwanda
- Voting summary: 15 voted for; None voted against; None abstained
- Result: Adopted

Security Council composition
- Permanent members: China; France; Russia; United Kingdom; United States
- Non-permanent members: Brazil; Cape Verde; Djibouti; Hungary; Japan; Morocco; New Zealand; Pakistan; Spain; Venezuela

United Nations Security Council resolution 846, adopted unanimously on 22 June 1993, after reaffirming Resolution 812 (1993) on the situation in Rwanda and noting a report by the Secretary-General Boutros Boutros-Ghali, the council established the United Nations Observer Mission Uganda–Rwanda (UNOMUR) for an initial period of six months.

The need to prevent a resumption of fighting in Rwanda–among majority Hutus, minority Tutsis, the government of Juvénal Habyarimana and Rwandan Patriotic Front (RPF) was emphasised, as was the need for a negotiated political solution in the framework of agreements to be signed in Arusha, Tanzania. At the same time, the council praised the efforts of the Organisation of African Unity (OAU) and government of Tanzania to find a solution.

After establishing UNOMUR for an initial period of six months on the common border between Rwanda and Uganda, it was decided that it would monitor the Uganda–Rwanda border to verify that no military assistance reached Rwanda especially with regard to weapons and ammunition being transported by road or track. Before the full deployment of UNOMUR, a status of mission agreement ensuring the safety of the peacekeeping personnel and full co-operation of the government of Uganda would have to be reached with the secretary-general, with an advanced dispatch within 15 days and full deployment within 30 days of the adoption of the current resolution. After 60 days, the council requested a report on the implementation of the current resolution.

The council urged the Rwandan government and RPF to respect international humanitarian law, refrain from any action that could increase tensions in the region and immediately conclude a peace agreement. The decision of Boutros-Ghali to support the peace efforts of the OAU by putting two military experts at its disposal was supported by the council, which requested him to report back on developments relating to a political agreement in Arusha and of the contribution the United Nations could make to assist the OAU in the implementation of the above-mentioned agreement.

== See also ==
- Arusha Accords
- History of Rwanda
- List of United Nations Security Council Resolutions 801 to 900 (1993–1994)
- Rwandan Civil War
