= United Nations Security Council Resolution 802 =

UN Security Council Resolution 802
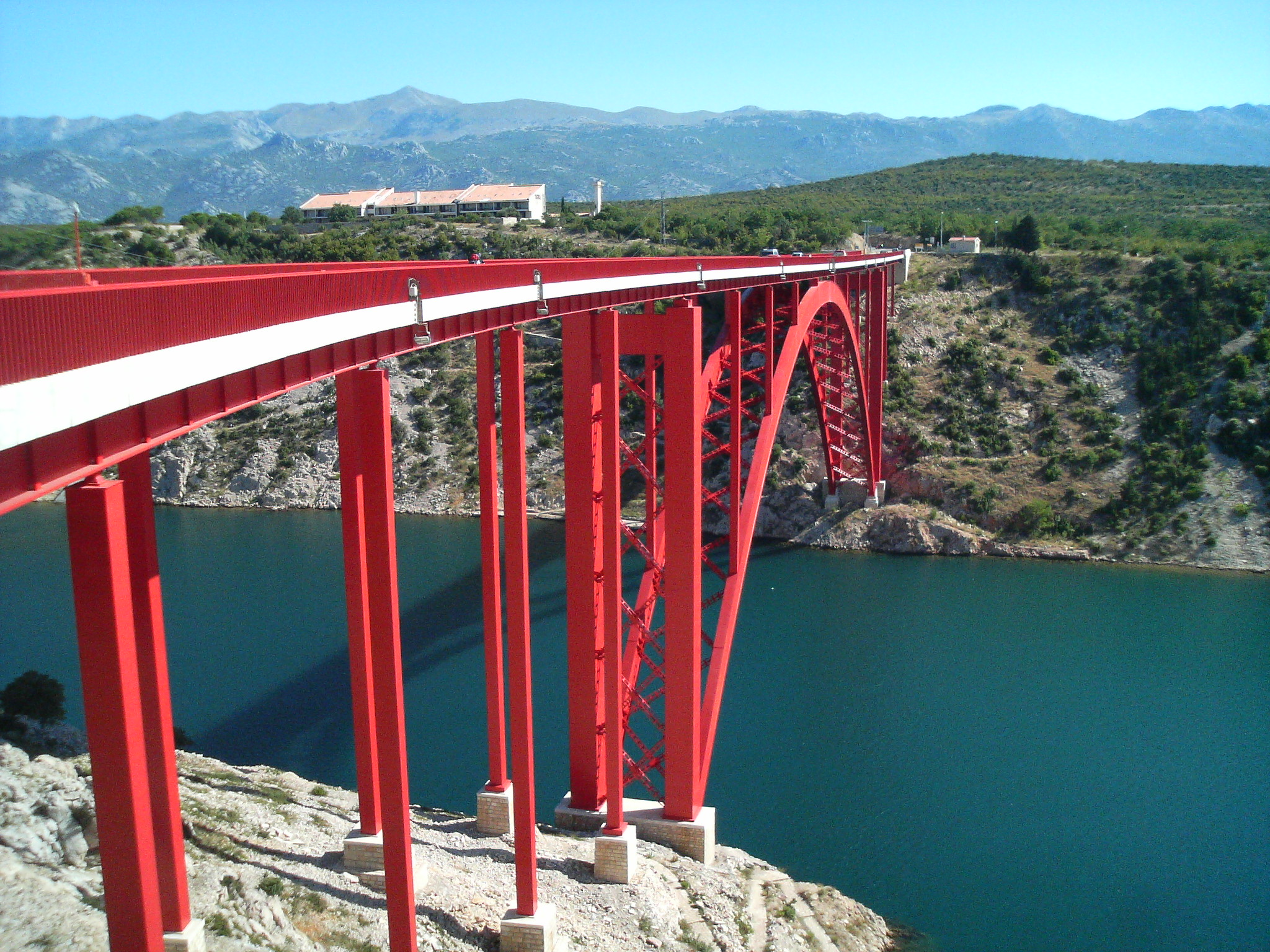
- Rebuilt bridge at Maslenica
- Date: 25 January 1993
- Meeting no.: 3,163
- Code: S/RES/802 (Document)
- Subject: Croatia
- Voting summary: 15 voted for; None voted against; None abstained
- Result: Adopted

Security Council composition
- Permanent members: China; France; Russia; United Kingdom; United States
- Non-permanent members: Brazil; Cape Verde; Djibouti; Hungary; Japan; Morocco; New Zealand; Pakistan; Spain; Venezuela

United Nations Security Council resolution 802, adopted unanimously on 25 January 1993, after reaffirming Resolution 713 (1991) and all subsequent relevant resolutions and expressing its concern at offensives by the Croatian Army in the United Nations Protected Areas, the council demanded the immediate cessation of hostilities and the withdrawal of Croatian forces from the areas.

The council also condemned the attacks on the United Nations Protection Force (UNPROFOR), demanding that weapons seized from the force at warehouses be returned immediately. It also called on all parties and others concerned to comply strictly with the ceasefire arrangements and the United Nations peacekeeping plan, including the disbanding and demobilisation of Serb Territorial Defence units and others.

The resolution then expressed condolences to the families of those killed from UNPROFOR, demanding the parties in the region respect the safety of the Force. It also demanded that all parties co-operate with the protection force and allow civilian traffic to use the crossings at Maslenica and in Split.

== See also ==
- Breakup of Yugoslavia
- Bosnian War
- Croatian War of Independence
- List of United Nations Security Council Resolutions 801 to 900 (1993–1994)
- Republic of Serbian Krajina
- Yugoslav Wars
- List of United Nations Security Council Resolutions related to the conflicts in former Yugoslavia
