= United Nations Security Council Resolution 810 =

UN Security Council Resolution 810
- Flag of Cambodia under UNTAC
- Date: 8 March 1993
- Meeting no.: 3,181
- Code: S/RES/810 (Document)
- Subject: The situation in Cambodia
- Voting summary: 15 voted for; None voted against; None abstained
- Result: Adopted

Security Council composition
- Permanent members: China; France; Russia; United Kingdom; United States
- Non-permanent members: Brazil; Cape Verde; Djibouti; Hungary; Japan; Morocco; New Zealand; Pakistan; Spain; Venezuela

United Nations Security Council resolution 810, adopted unanimously on 8 March 1993, after recalling resolutions 668 (1990) and 745 (1992), the council, after deploring continuing political violence in Cambodia in violation of the Paris Agreements as well as attacks and detention of members of the United Nations Transitional Authority in Cambodia (UNTAC), discussed upcoming elections to the Constituent Assembly, as part of a process of national reconciliation.

The resolution endorsed the decision by the Supreme National Council of Cambodia that elections should be held between 23 and 27 May 1993, expressed its satisfaction at voter registration and urged all parties to co-operate with UNTAC in preparations for the elections. It also called on UNTAC to create and maintain a neutral political environment conducive to the holding of free and fair elections, requesting the Secretary-General Boutros Boutros-Ghali to inform the security council of these preparations by 15 May 1993.

Addressing Cambodian parties, including Funcinpec, Khmer People's National Liberation Front, the Party of Democratic Kampuchea and party of the state of Cambodia, the council called on all to help create tolerance for peaceful political competition, taking into account freedom of speech, assembly, movement and of the press and assuring the Cambodian people that balloting will be secret. It also demanded that all parties put an end to acts of violence and to all threats and intimidation committed on political or ethnic grounds and to respect the Paris Agreements signed in 1991.

The council then expressed its confidence in the ability of UNTAC to hold conduct a free and fair election and its readiness to endorse the results of the election provided that the United Nations certified it free and fair. It also recognised that Cambodians have responsibility to agree a constitution and form a government within three months of the election.

Resolution 810 concluded by welcoming the Supreme National Council's decision to protect natural resources, demanding all parties guarantee the safety of UNTAC personnel and cease intimidation and requested the Boutros-Ghali to report on any further measures necessary to ensure the realisation of the Paris Agreements.

== See also ==
- List of United Nations Security Council Resolutions 801 to 900 (1993–1994)
- Modern Cambodia
- Transition of the People's Republic of Kampuchea to Cambodia
