= United Nations Security Council Resolution 812 =

UN Security Council Resolution 812
- Rwanda
- Date: 12 March 1993
- Meeting no.: 3,183
- Code: S/RES/812 (Document)
- Subject: Rwanda
- Voting summary: 15 voted for; None voted against; None abstained
- Result: Adopted

Security Council composition
- Permanent members: China; France; Russia; United Kingdom; United States
- Non-permanent members: Brazil; Cape Verde; Djibouti; Hungary; Japan; Morocco; New Zealand; Pakistan; Spain; Venezuela

United Nations Security Council resolution 812, adopted unanimously on 12 March 1993, after expressing its alarm at the humanitarian situation in Rwanda due to the ongoing civil war, in particular the number of refugees and displaced persons which posed an international threat to peace and security, the Council called upon the Government of Rwanda, the National Republican Movement for Democracy and Development, and the Rwandan Patriotic Front to respect a ceasefire that took place on 9 March 1993 and implement other agreements they had committed themselves to. It was the first resolution on the situation in Rwanda.

The resolution invited the Secretary General Boutros Boutros-Ghali to examine possible contributions by the United Nations to strengthen the Organisation of African Unity's (OAU) efforts in Rwanda, including the possible establishment of an international force. It also asked Boutros-Ghali to examine requests by Rwanda and Uganda to deploy observers along their border.

Resolution 812 concluded by asking both Rwandan parties to co-operate with the United Nations and OAU, and to resume their negotiations on 15 March 1993 as agreed, urging both to respect international humanitarian law.

== See also ==
- Arusha Accords
- History of Rwanda
- Juvénal Habyarimana
- List of United Nations Security Council Resolutions 801 to 900 (1993–1994)
- Rwandan Civil War
- United Nations Observer Mission Uganda–Rwanda
