= United Nations Security Council Resolution 1186 =

UN Security Council Resolution 1186
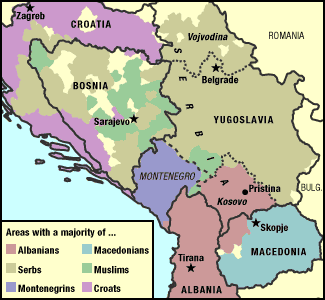
- Ethnic groups in the former Yugoslavia
- Date: 21 July 1998
- Meeting no.: 3,911
- Code: S/RES/1186 (Document)
- Subject: The situation in the former Yugoslav Republic of Macedonia
- Voting summary: 15 voted for; None voted against; None abstained
- Result: Adopted

Security Council composition
- Permanent members: China; France; Russia; United Kingdom; United States
- Non-permanent members: Bahrain; Brazil; Costa Rica; Gabon; Gambia; Japan; Kenya; Portugal; Slovenia; Sweden

United Nations Security Council resolution 1186, adopted unanimously on 21 July 1998, after recalling resolutions 1105 (1997) and 1110 (1997), the Council extended and strengthened the mandate of the United Nations Preventive Deployment Force (UNPREDEP) in Macedonia until 28 February 1999.

The resolution noted that the UNPREDEP mission played an important role in maintaining peace and stability in Macedonia, and recalled resolutions concerning the situation in Albania, including 1101 (1997) and 1114 (1997). It also recalled Resolution 1160 (1998) which imposed an arms embargo on the Federal Republic of Yugoslavia (Serbia and Montenegro) including Kosovo. The UNPREDEP peacekeeping mission also monitored the border to prevent the spread of conflict and illegal arms flows.

The Security Council strengthened the UNPREDEP mission by up to 1,050 personnel and extended its mandate for a further six months to monitor the provisions of Resolution 1160. It would be the final extension of the Preventive Deployment Force due to a veto by China after Macedonia's recognition of Taiwan. In the following months, the first refugees from Kosovo crossed the border into Macedonia, with Macedonian President Kiro Gligorov stating that UNPREDEP's presence was most needed at that point.

== See also ==
- Breakup of Yugoslavia
- Kosovo War
- List of United Nations Security Council Resolutions 1101 to 1200 (1997–1998)
- Yugoslav Wars
- United Nations Security Council Resolution S/1999/201
- List of United Nations Security Council Resolutions related to the conflicts in former Yugoslavia
