= United Nations Security Council Resolution 1140 =

UN Security Council Resolution 1140
- Flag of Macedonia
- Date: 28 November 1997
- Meeting no.: 3,836
- Code: S/RES/1140 (Document)
- Subject: The situation in the former Yugoslav Republic of Macedonia
- Voting summary: 15 voted for; None voted against; None abstained
- Result: Adopted

Security Council composition
- Permanent members: China; France; Russia; United Kingdom; United States
- Non-permanent members: Chile; Costa Rica; Egypt; Guinea-Bissau; Japan; Kenya; South Korea; Poland; Portugal; Sweden

United Nations Security Council resolution 1140, adopted unanimously on 28 November 1997, after recalling resolutions 1110 (1997), the Council renewed the mandate of the United Nations Preventive Deployment Force (UNPREDEP) in Macedonia for four days until 4 December 1997, pending further discussions. Resolution 1142 (1997) later extended UNPREDEP until 31 August 1998.

== See also ==
- Breakup of Yugoslavia
- List of United Nations Security Council Resolutions 1101 to 1200 (1997–1998)
- Macedonia naming dispute
- Yugoslav Wars
- List of United Nations Security Council Resolutions related to the conflicts in former Yugoslavia
