= United Nations Security Council Resolution 1209 =

UN Security Council Resolution 1209
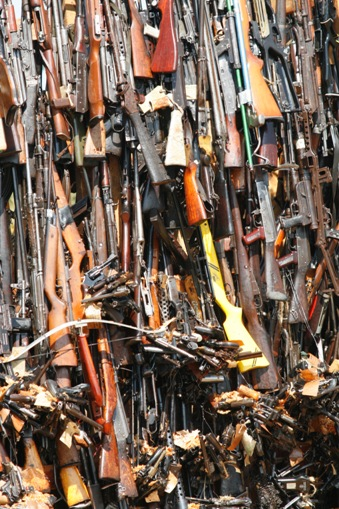
- Seized weapons in Kenya
- Date: 19 November 1998
- Meeting no.: 3,945
- Code: S/RES/1209 (Document)
- Subject: The situation in Africa
- Voting summary: 15 voted for; None voted against; None abstained
- Result: Adopted

Security Council composition
- Permanent members: China; France; Russia; United Kingdom; United States
- Non-permanent members: Bahrain; Brazil; Costa Rica; Gabon; Gambia; Japan; Kenya; Portugal; Slovenia; Sweden

United Nations Security Council resolution 1209, adopted unanimously on 19 November 1998, after recalling resolutions 1170 (1998) and 1196 (1998) on Africa, the Council addressed illicit arms flows on the continent.

== Observations ==
The Security Council considered further a report by the Secretary-General Kofi Annan on the situation in Africa concerning the importance of stemming illegal arms flows. It recognised that illegal arms traffic was closely connected to the role of commercial and political interests. African countries did have the right to obtain weapons for reasons of national security and policing. Switzerland had offered to hold a conference in Geneva on illegal arms traffic and there were negotiations in Vienna on the elaboration of an international convention against transnational organised crime, including a protocol to combat illicit manufacturing and trafficking in firearms. The Council commended African initiatives to address the problem of arms flows, such as in Mali and Mozambique, the Economic Community of West African States (ECOWAS) and the Southern African Development Community (SADC).

== Acts ==
The Security Council was concerned about large-scale illegal arms trafficking in Africa, particularly of small arms and the threat it posed to security, development and humanitarian situation on the continent. In this regard, African countries were urged to introduce legislation on the use of arms. Member States, particularly those that manufactured weapons, were reminded of the importance of restricting arms transfers which could provoke or prolong armed conflicts. The resolution encouraged African states to participate in the United Nations Register of Conventional Arms and to establish regional and subregional registers to enhance the transparency of arms transfers. They were also instructed to look to the European Union and Organization of American States for their efforts in tackling the arms trade and to adopt similar measures.

In addition, the Secretary-General was encouraged to find ways to identify international arms dealers acting in contravention of national legislation or arms embargoes imposed by the United Nations. He was also urged to promote co-operation among Member States, to explore ways of disseminating information on arms flows and their destabilising effects and to implement voluntary weapons collection programmes.

== See also ==
- Great Lakes refugee crisis
- Gun politics
- History of Africa
- List of conflicts in Africa
- List of United Nations Security Council Resolutions 1201 to 1300 (1998–2000)
