= United Nations Security Council Resolution 1142 =

UN Security Council Resolution 1142
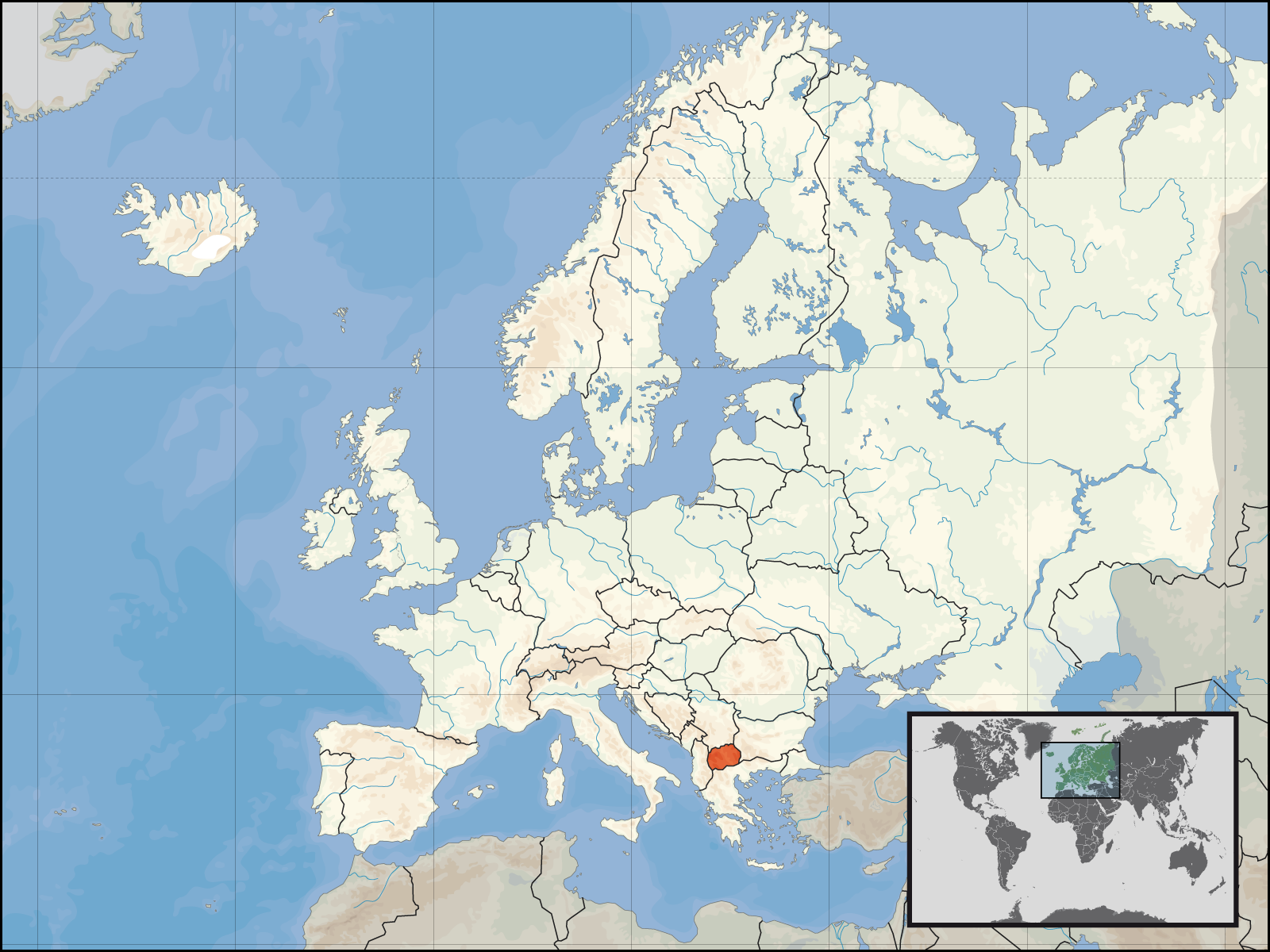
- Macedonia (highlighted) in Europe
- Date: 4 December 1997
- Meeting no.: 3,839
- Code: S/RES/1142 (Document)
- Subject: The situation in the former Yugoslav Republic of Macedonia
- Voting summary: 15 voted for; None voted against; None abstained
- Result: Adopted

Security Council composition
- Permanent members: China; France; Russia; United Kingdom; United States
- Non-permanent members: Chile; Costa Rica; Egypt; Guinea-Bissau; Japan; Kenya; South Korea; Poland; Portugal; Sweden

United Nations Security Council resolution 1142, adopted unanimously on 4 December 1997, after recalling resolutions 1105 (1997) and 1110 (1997), the Council extended the mandate of the United Nations Preventive Deployment Force (UNPREDEP) in Macedonia until 31 August 1998.

The resolution noted that the UNPREDEP mission played an important role in maintaining peace and stability in Macedonia, but was concerned at the situation in Albania, as expressed in resolutions 1101 (1997) and 1114 (1997). Additionally, both Macedonia and Serbia and Montenegro were called upon to implement the agreement concerning the demarcation of their common border. It welcomed the phased reduction and restructuring of UNPREDEP troop strength. The Secretary-General Kofi Annan reported some positive developments such as the stabilisation of the situation in Albania, but that peace and stability in Macedonia also depended on developments in other parts of the region.

The Security Council extended UNPREDEP's mandate until 31 August 1998 with the expected withdrawal of the military component thereafter. Finally, Kofi Annan was directed to report on the modalities of the termination of UNPREDEP, the withdrawal of its military component and a future international presence in Macedonia, by 1 June 1998.

== See also ==
- Breakup of Yugoslavia
- List of United Nations Security Council Resolutions 1101 to 1200 (1997–1998)
- Macedonia naming dispute
- Yugoslav Wars
- List of United Nations Security Council Resolutions related to the conflicts in former Yugoslavia
