= United Nations Security Council Resolution 1178 =

UN Security Council Resolution 1178
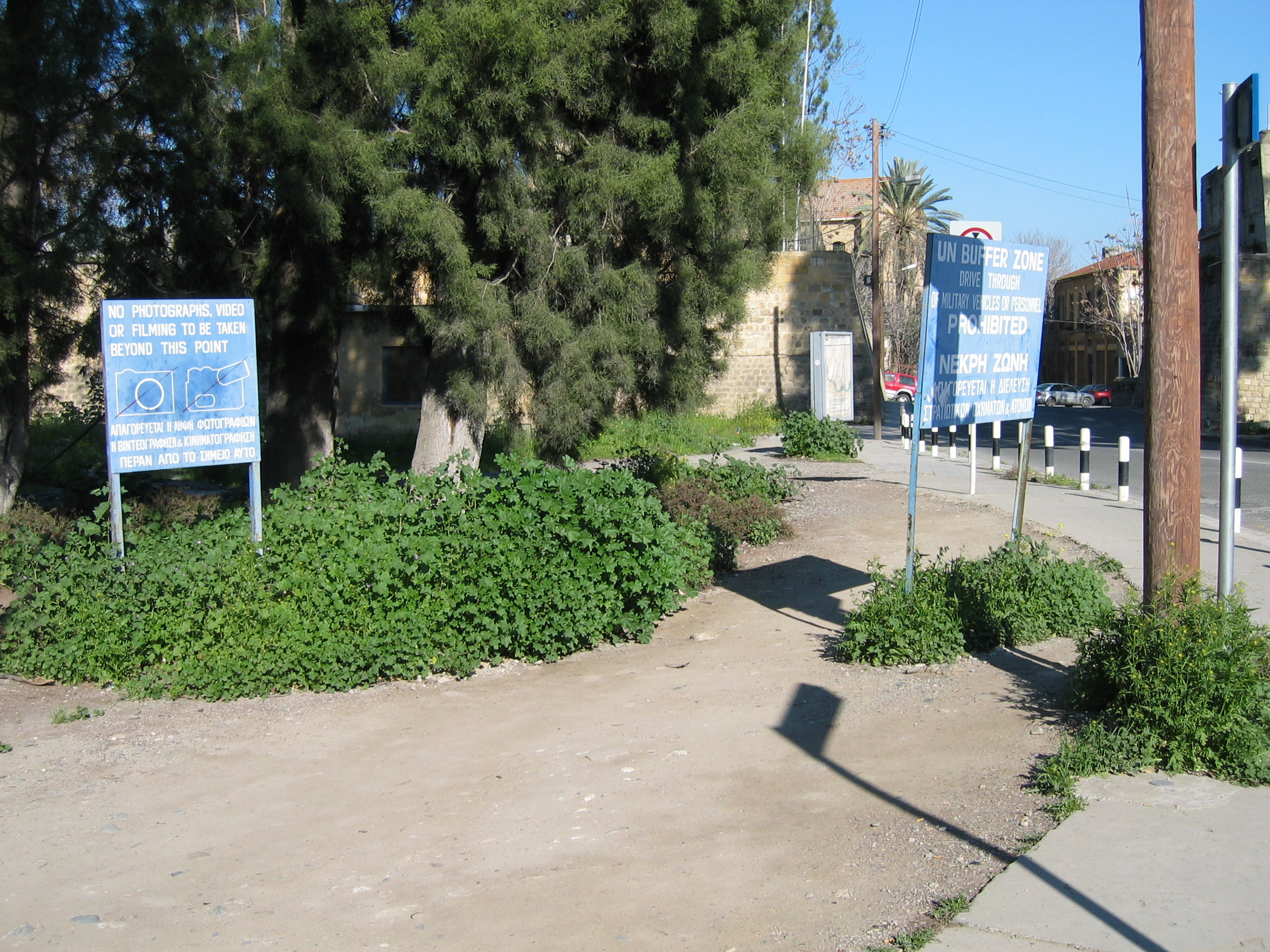
- Buffer zone in Nicosia
- Date: 29 June 1998
- Meeting no.: 3,898
- Code: S/RES/1178 (Document)
- Subject: The situation in Cyprus
- Voting summary: 15 voted for; None voted against; None abstained
- Result: Adopted

Security Council composition
- Permanent members: China; France; Russia; United Kingdom; United States
- Non-permanent members: Bahrain; Brazil; Costa Rica; Gabon; Gambia; Japan; Kenya; Portugal; Slovenia; Sweden

United Nations Security Council resolution 1178, adopted unanimously on 29 June 1998, after reaffirming all past resolutions on the situation in Cyprus, the Council extended the mandate of the United Nations Peacekeeping Force in Cyprus (UNFICYP) for a further six months until 31 December 1998.

The Government of Cyprus had again agreed to the continued presence of UNFICYP on the island. Tensions along the ceasefire line remained high and there were restrictions upon UNFICYP's freedom of movement.

The mandate of UNFICYP was extended until 31 December 1998 and authorities in Cyprus and Northern Cyprus were reminded to ensure the safety of UNFICYP personnel and end violence against it. Military authorities on both sides were urged to refrain from actions that could exacerbate tensions, and it was important that Cyprus adopted measures proposed by UNFICYP to reduce tension, which were agreed to by the north. There was also concern about the strengthening of military weapons in southern Cyprus and the lack of progress in decreasing the number of foreign troops. In this regard, the Council urged the Republic of Cyprus to cut back on defence spending and withdraw foreign troops, with an overall view to demilitarising the entire island.

The security council welcomed the intention of UNFICYP to implement its humanitarian mandate. Both sides were urged to resume discussions on security issues that had begun in September 1997.

Finally, the Secretary-General Kofi Annan was requested to report back to the council by 10 December 1998 on the implementation of the current resolution. Resolution 1179 adopted the same day further discussed the peace process on the island.

== See also ==
- Cyprus dispute
- List of United Nations Security Council Resolutions 1101 to 1200 (1997–1998)
- United Nations Buffer Zone in Cyprus
- Turkish Invasion of Cyprus
