= United Nations Security Council Resolution 1148 =

UN Security Council Resolution 1148
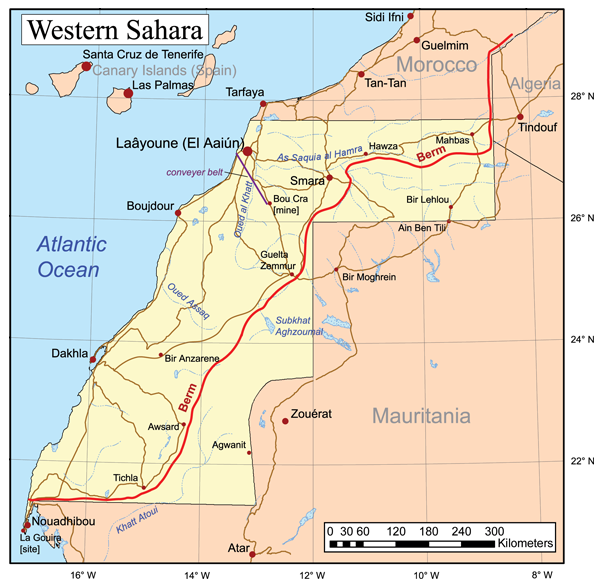
- Western Sahara
- Date: 26 January 1998
- Meeting no.: 3,849
- Code: S/RES/1148 (Document)
- Subject: The situation concerning Western Sahara
- Voting summary: 15 voted for; None voted against; None abstained
- Result: Adopted

Security Council composition
- Permanent members: China; France; Russia; United Kingdom; United States
- Non-permanent members: Bahrain; Brazil; Costa Rica; Gabon; Gambia; Japan; Kenya; Portugal; Slovenia; Sweden

United Nations Security Council resolution 1148, adopted unanimously on 26 January 1998, after recalling all previous resolutions on the Western Sahara, particularly Resolution 1133 (1997), the Council approved the deployment of an engineering unit to support the deployment of the United Nations Mission for the Referendum in Western Sahara (MINURSO).

The resolution began by welcoming the appointment of Charles Dunbar, the Special Representative of the Secretary-General Kofi Annan. The Secretary-General had submitted plans detailing the strengthening of MINURSO, and the Council welcomed the resumption of identification of eligible voters. It approved the deployment of an engineering unit to assist in demining activities and of additional administrative staff to support the deployment of military personnel. Additional troops would be deployed when it was considered necessary. Both the Moroccan government and the Polisario Front were called upon to co-operate in the implementation of the Settlement Plan and the identification process in a timely manner.

== See also ==
- History of Western Sahara
- List of United Nations Security Council Resolutions 1101 to 1200 (1997–1998)
- Sahrawi Arab Democratic Republic
- Moroccan Western Sahara Wall
