= United Nations Security Council Resolution 1146 =

UN Security Council Resolution 1146
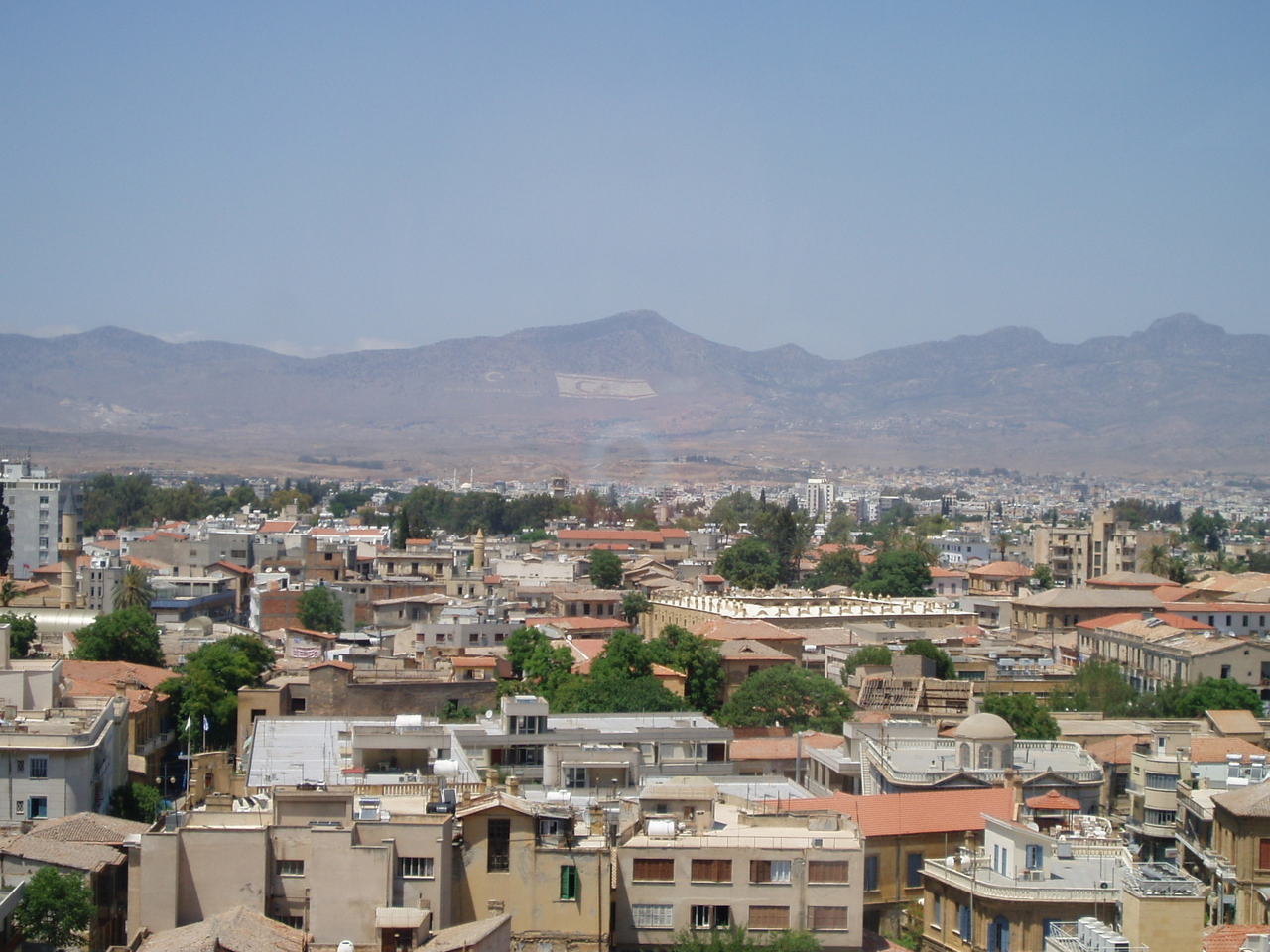
- Northern part of Nicosia, with the flag of Northern Cyprus in the distance
- Date: 23 December 1997
- Meeting no.: 3,846
- Code: S/RES/1146 (Document)
- Subject: The situation in Cyprus
- Voting summary: 15 voted for; None voted against; None abstained
- Result: Adopted

Security Council composition
- Permanent members: China; France; Russia; United Kingdom; United States
- Non-permanent members: Chile; Costa Rica; Egypt; Guinea-Bissau; Japan; Kenya; South Korea; Poland; Portugal; Sweden

United Nations Security Council resolution 1146, adopted unanimously on 23 December 1997, after recalling all resolutions on Cyprus, particularly resolutions 186 (1964), 939 (1994) and 1117 (1997), the Council extended the mandate of the United Nations Peacekeeping Force in Cyprus (UNFICYP) for a further six months until 30 June 1998.

The Government of Cyprus had again agreed to the continued presence of UNFICYP on the island. Tensions along the ceasefire line remained high, although serious incidents had decreased. It was also noted that there were increased restrictions upon UNFICYP's freedom of movement and negotiations to a mutually acceptable resolution were in continued deadlock after two recent direct talks between Cyprus and Northern Cyprus.

The mandate of UNFICYP was extended until 30 June 1998. It was important that the parties quickly agreed to the measures proposed by UNFICYP to reduce tension. There was also concern about strengthening military weapons in southern Cyprus and the lack of progress in decreasing the number of foreign troops. In this regard, the Council urged the Republic of Cyprus to cut back on defence spending and withdraw foreign troops, with an overall view to demilitarising the entire island.

After reiterating the unacceptability of the current situation, the council welcomed the intention of the Secretary-General Kofi Annan to resume negotiations in March 1998, and both Cypriot leaders were urged to co-operate with the secretary-general. It welcomed an agreement by the leaders on missing persons in July 1997 and bi-communal events – which had increased – were urged to take place to improve mutual co-operation and trust between the two communities.

Secretary-General Kofi Annan was instructed to report back to the council by 10 June 1998 on the implementation of the current resolution.

== See also ==
- Cyprus dispute
- List of United Nations Security Council Resolutions 1101 to 1200 (1997–1998)
- United Nations Buffer Zone in Cyprus
- Turkish Invasion of Cyprus
