= United Nations Security Council Resolution 1162 =

United Nations Security Council resolution

UN Security Council Resolution 1162
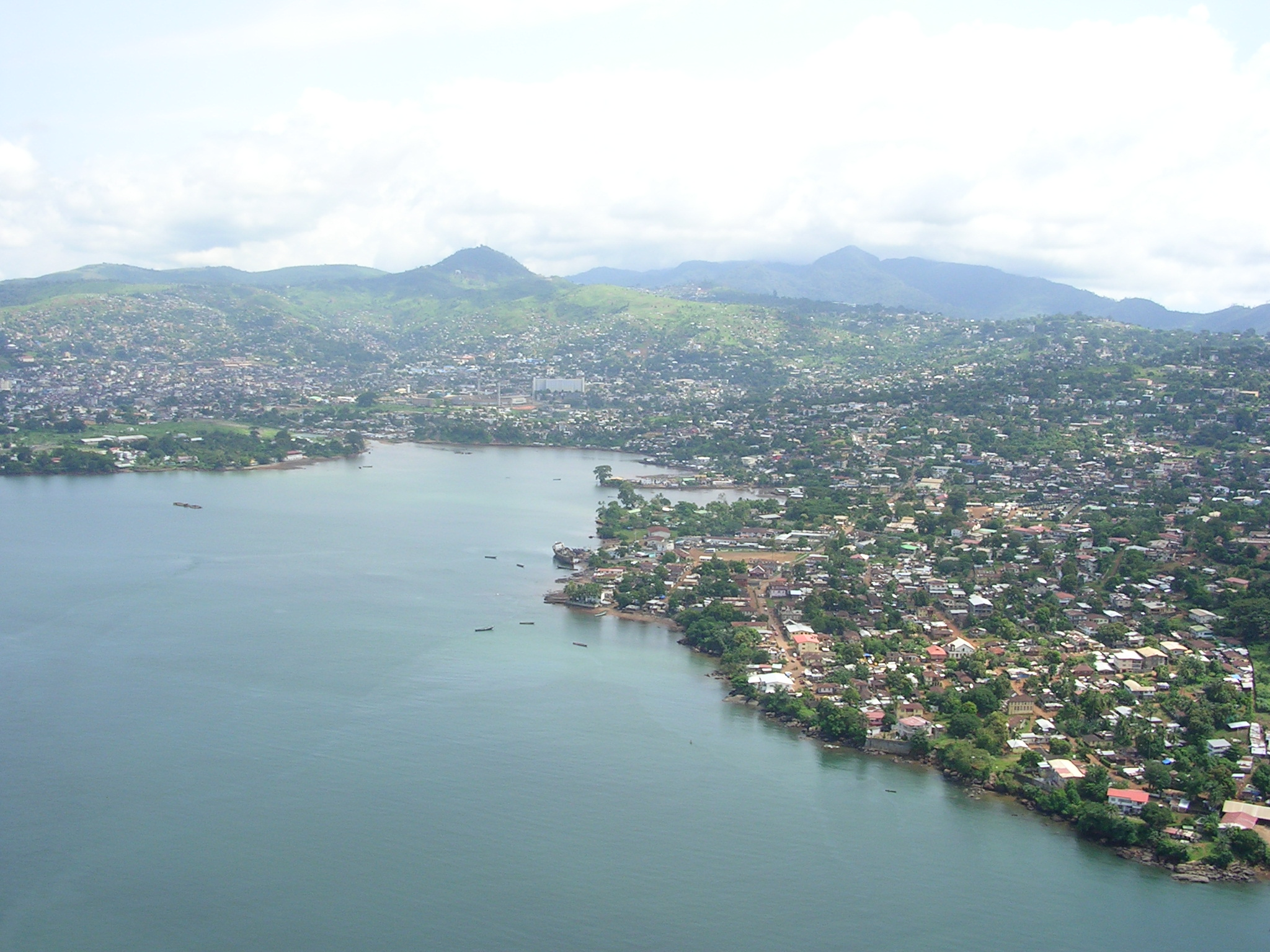
- Freetown, capital of Sierra Leone
- Date: 17 April 1998
- Meeting no.: 3,872
- Code: S/RES/1162 (Document)
- Subject: The situation in Sierra Leone
- Voting summary: 15 voted for; None voted against; None abstained
- Result: Adopted

Security Council composition
- Permanent members: China; France; Russia; United Kingdom; United States
- Non-permanent members: Bahrain; Brazil; Costa Rica; Gabon; Gambia; Japan; Kenya; Portugal; Slovenia; Sweden

United Nations Security Council resolution 1162, adopted unanimously on 17 April 1998, after recalling resolutions 1132 (1997) and 1156 (1998) on the situation in Sierra Leone, the Council authorised the deployment of 10 United Nations military liaison and security advisory personnel to ascertain the situation in the country.

The Security Council welcomed the efforts of the President of Sierra Leone Ahmad Tejan Kabbah to restore peace, stability and governance. Observers from the Economic Community of West African States (ECOWAS) and United Nations had played an important role. The resolution authorised the deployment of up to 10 liaison and security advisory personnel for up to 90 days under the authority of the Secretary-General's Special Envoy to report on the military situation, to assist the Economic Community of West African States Monitoring Group (ECOMOG) and the design of a disarmament plan. There would soon be a decision on the deployment of United Nations troops, including human rights observers, after the office of the Special Envoy was strengthened in the capital Freetown.

Finally, Member States were urged to provide humanitarian assistance to Sierra Leone following an appeal, participate in the reconstruction of the country and to contribute to a trust fund created to support peacekeeping operations in Sierra Leone.

== See also ==
- History of Sierra Leone
- List of United Nations Security Council Resolutions 1101 to 1200 (1997–1998)
- Sierra Leone Civil War
