= United Nations Security Council Resolution 1163 =

United Nations Security Council resolution

UN Security Council Resolution 1163
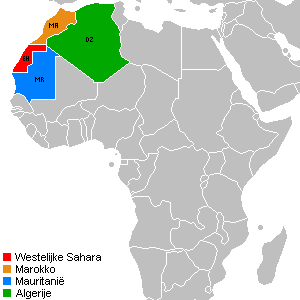
- Western Sahara (red), Morocco (orange), Mauritania (blue) and Algeria (green)
- Date: 17 April 1998
- Meeting no.: 3,873
- Code: S/RES/1163 (Document)
- Subject: The situation concerning Western Sahara
- Voting summary: 15 voted for; None voted against; None abstained
- Result: Adopted

Security Council composition
- Permanent members: China; France; Russia; United Kingdom; United States
- Non-permanent members: Bahrain; Brazil; Costa Rica; Gabon; Gambia; Japan; Kenya; Portugal; Slovenia; Sweden

United Nations Security Council resolution 1163, adopted unanimously on 17 April 1998, after reaffirming all previous resolutions on the Western Sahara, the Council extended the mandate of the United Nations Mission for the Referendum in Western Sahara (MINURSO) until 20 July 1998 so that it could proceed with voter identification tasks.

The Security Council reaffirmed the agreement between the Government of Morocco and the Polisario Front on the implementation of the Settlement Plan, and that the responsibility for voter identification was that of the Identification Commission. It also reiterated the need for a referendum on self-determination for the people of Western Sahara in accordance with the Settlement Plan.

After extending MINURSO's mandate until 20 July 1998, the resolution noted the continued deployment of engineering units and administrative staff required for demining and supporting the deployment of military personnel respectively and would consider a request for additional troops and police. The Council called upon the governments of Algeria, Mauritania and Morocco to sign Status of Forces Agreements with the United Nations.

The resolution concluded by directing the Secretary-General Kofi Annan to report to the Council every 30 days on the implementation of the current resolution and the mandate of MINURSO.

== See also ==
- History of Western Sahara
- List of United Nations Security Council Resolutions 1101 to 1200 (1997–1998)
- Sahrawi Arab Democratic Republic
- Moroccan Western Sahara Wall
