= United Nations Security Council Resolution 1197 =

UN Security Council Resolution 1197
- Membership of the OAU
- Date: 18 September 1998
- Meeting no.: 3,928
- Code: S/RES/1197 (Document)
- Subject: The situation in Africa
- Voting summary: 15 voted for; None voted against; None abstained
- Result: Adopted

Security Council composition
- Permanent members: China; France; Russia; United Kingdom; United States
- Non-permanent members: Bahrain; Brazil; Costa Rica; Gabon; Gambia; Japan; Kenya; Portugal; Slovenia; Sweden

United Nations Security Council resolution 1197, adopted unanimously on 18 September 1998, after reaffirming its primary responsibility to maintain international peace and security, the Council addressed co-operation efforts with the Organisation of African Unity (OAU).

The Security Council considered the recommendations in a report by the Secretary-General Kofi Annan on "The causes of conflict and the promotion of durable peace and sustainable development in Africa" regarding the need for the United Nations to provide support and assistance to regional and subregional organisations in the area of conflict prevention. It recalled the provisions of Chapter VIII of the United Nations Charter to this effect.

The Secretary-General was invited to assist the OAU and African subregional organisations to establish logistics assessment teams and to determine the logistical and financial requirements of regional or subregional peacekeeping operations. He was also asked to further the development of a commonly accepted peacekeeping doctrine with Member States and share existing concepts of peacekeeping operations with the OAU and subregional organisations. They were also asked to establish logistics assessment teams. Partnerships between countries and regional organisations involved in peace operations were encouraged, and the Council welcomed a proposal by the Economic Community of West African States (ECOWAS) to establish a "council of elders" within its "Mechanism for the Prevention, Management, Resolution of Conflict, Peacekeeping and Security" to facilitate mediation efforts and asked for preparations to be made towards its establishment.

In part II of the resolution, the Council endorsed the establishment of a United Nations Preventive Action Liaison Office in the OAU. It encouraged the enhancement of consultation and co-ordination between the United Nations, the OAU and subregional organisations. Finally, the Secretary-General was invited to, and subsequently asked to implement the following measures:

(a) adopt mechanisms to improve the flow of information between the United Nations, OAU and subregional organisations;
(b) develop common indicators for an early warning system and to share this among their field representatives and headquarters;
(c) arrange visits of staff between the United Nations, OAU and subregional organisations;
(d) arrange joint meanings on areas concerning early warning systems and prevention, with the aim of co-ordinating initiatives with existing and potential conflicts.

== See also ==
- List of conflicts in Africa
- List of United Nations Security Council Resolutions 1101 to 1200 (1997–1998)
