= United Nations Security Council Resolution 1133 =

UN Security Council Resolution 1133
- Date: 20 October 1997
- Meeting no.: 3,825
- Code: S/RES/1133 (Document)
- Subject: The situation concerning Western Sahara
- Voting summary: 15 voted for; None voted against; None abstained
- Result: Adopted

Security Council composition
- Permanent members: China; France; Russia; United Kingdom; United States
- Non-permanent members: Chile; Costa Rica; Egypt; Guinea-Bissau; Japan; Kenya; South Korea; Poland; Portugal; Sweden

In United Nations Security Council resolution 1133, adopted unanimously on 20 October 1997, after reaffirming all previous resolutions on the Western Sahara, but recalling Resolution 1131 (1997), the Council extended the mandate of the United Nations Mission for the Referendum in Western Sahara (MINURSO) until 20 April 1998.

There were new agreements signed on the implementation of the United Nations Settlement Plan for Western Sahara. The Council reiterated its determination to hold a free, fair and impartial referendum on self-determination for the people of Western Sahara. It was also pleased with the co-operation of Morocco and the Polisario Front with James A. Baker III, the Personal Envoy of the Secretary-General.

In this regard, both parties were called upon to continue their engagement with the United Nations by fully implementing the Settlement Plan. MINURSO's mandate was extended so that it could continue with its voter identification tasks and expanded to include up to nine centres an additional 298 staff. The process was expected to be complete by 31 May 1998. Finally, the Secretary-General Kofi Annan was requested to submit a comprehensive report by 15 November 1997 with a detailed plan, timetable and financial implications of the referendum, and then every 60 days to report on implementation of the Settlement Plan.

== See also ==
- History of Western Sahara
- List of United Nations Security Council Resolutions 1101 to 1200 (1997–1998)
- Sahrawi Arab Democratic Republic
- Moroccan Western Sahara Wall
