= United Nations Security Council Resolution 1113 =

UN Security Council Resolution 1113
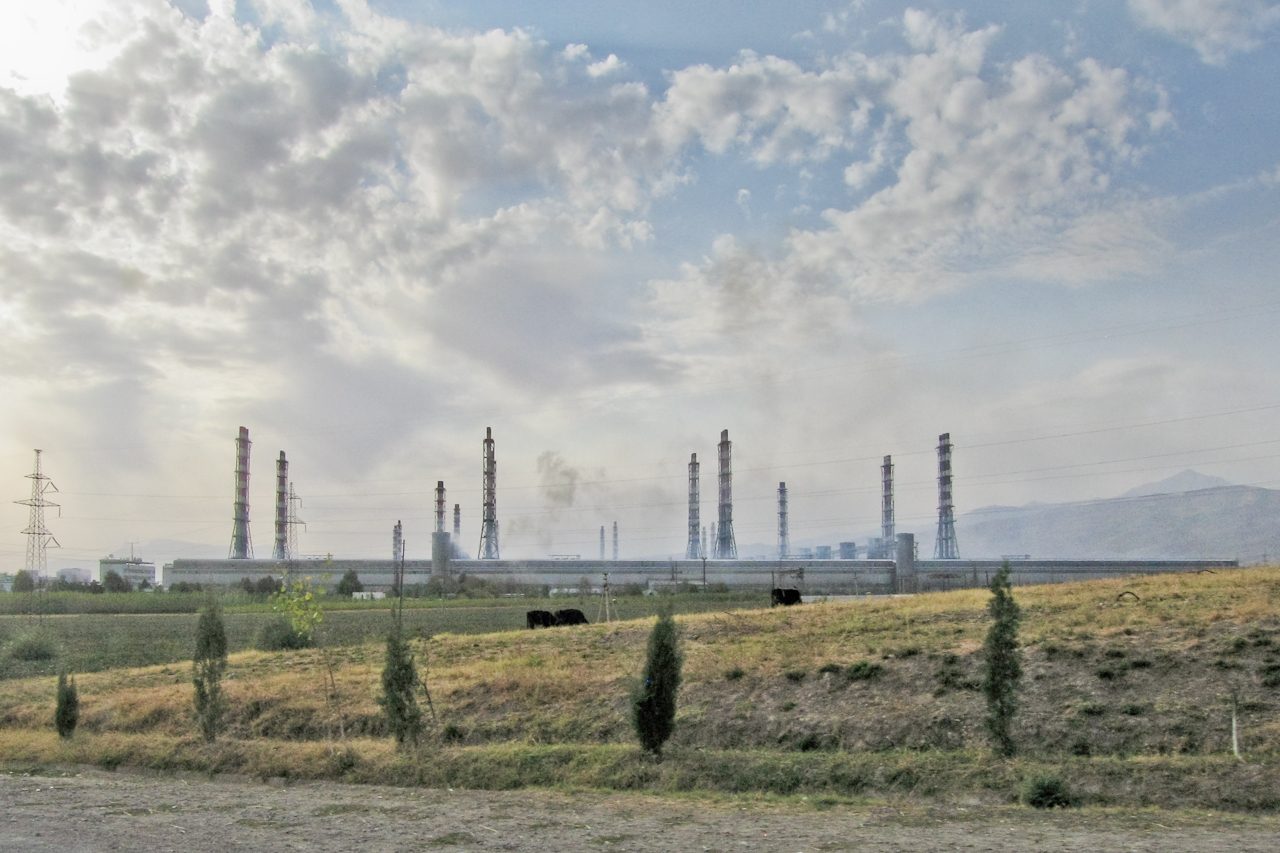
- Tajik Aluminium Company in Tursunzoda, Tajikistan
- Date: 12 June 1997
- Meeting no.: 3,788
- Code: S/RES/1113 (Document)
- Subject: The situation in Tajikistan and along the Tajik-Afghan border
- Voting summary: 15 voted for; None voted against; None abstained
- Result: Adopted

Security Council composition
- Permanent members: China; France; Russia; United Kingdom; United States
- Non-permanent members: Chile; Costa Rica; Egypt; Guinea-Bissau; Japan; Kenya; South Korea; Poland; Portugal; Sweden

United Nations Security Council resolution 1113, adopted unanimously on 12 June 1997, after recalling all resolutions on the situation in Tajikistan and the Tajik-Afghan border, the Council extended the mandate of the United Nations Mission of Observers in Tajikistan (UNMOT) for a period of three months until 15 September 1997.

The resolution reaffirmed the sovereignty, territorial integrity of Tajikistan and the inviolability of its borders. On 8 March 1997 the Government of Tajikistan and United Tajik Opposition (UTO) signed a protocol on military issues. This was followed on 18 and 28 May 1997 by protocols on political issues and guarantees the implementation of the peace agreement respectively. At the same time it was noted that the aforementioned agreements provided for the assistance of the international community and the United Nations, while concern was expressed at the deteriorating humanitarian and security situation in Tajikistan. United Nations staff and military observers returned to Tajikistan on 12 May 1997 after previously being evacuated.

Both parties were called upon to fully implement the peace agreements and to sign the General Agreement on the Establishment of Peace and National Accord in Tajikistan. This would require commitment from both parties and support from the United Nations and international community The parties were also urged to guarantee the freedom of movement and safety of UNMOT, the Commonwealth of Independent States (CIS) peacekeeping force and other international personnel. Finally, the Secretary-General Kofi Annan was requested to keep the Council informed on developments in the country as soon as possible, particularly on the role of the United Nations presence and adjustment of UNMOT's mandate.

== See also ==
- Tajikistani Civil War
- History of Tajikistan
- List of United Nations Security Council Resolutions 1101 to 1200 (1997–1998)
