= United Nations Security Council Resolution 1138 =

UN Security Council Resolution 1138
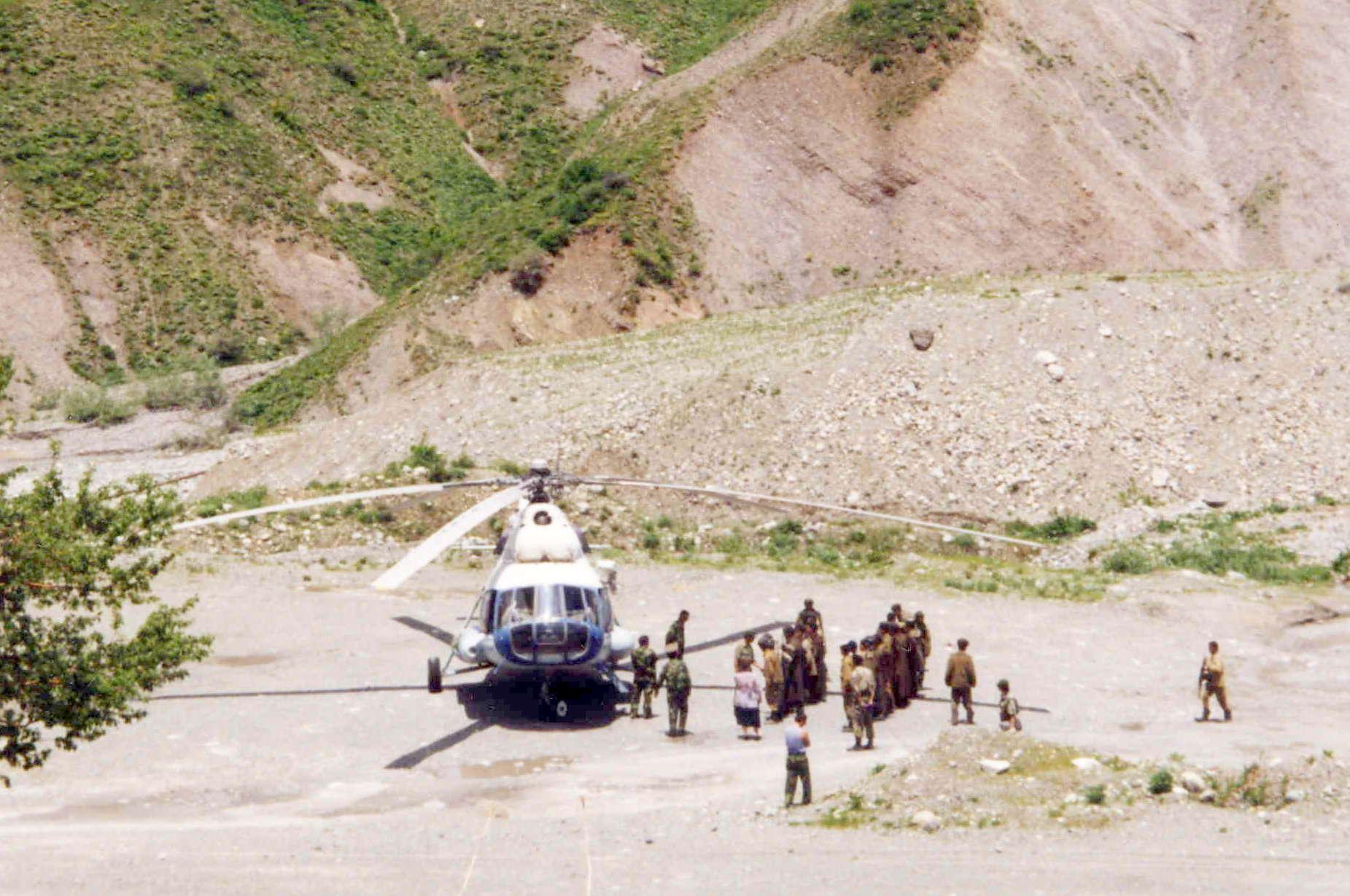
- Soldiers guarding a Tajik mine
- Date: 14 November 1997
- Meeting no.: 3,833
- Code: S/RES/1138 (Document)
- Subject: The situation in Tajikistan and along the Tajik-Afghan border
- Voting summary: 15 voted for; None voted against; None abstained
- Result: Adopted

Security Council composition
- Permanent members: China; France; Russia; United Kingdom; United States
- Non-permanent members: Chile; Costa Rica; Egypt; Guinea-Bissau; Japan; Kenya; South Korea; Poland; Portugal; Sweden

United Nations Security Council resolution 1138, adopted unanimously on 14 November 1997, after recalling all resolutions on the situation in Tajikistan and along the Tajik-Afghan border, the Council expanded and extended the mandate of the United Nations Mission of Observers in Tajikistan (UNMOT) until 15 May 1998.

The council observed further progress in the implementation of the peace agreement between the government of Tajikistan and the United Tajik Opposition (UTO), and the ceasefire was respected. The security situation remained precarious and there violence in the centre of the country, though other parts remained quiet.

The two parties in Tajikistan had made progress with regard to Commission on National Reconciliation, exchange of prisoners of war, the registration of UTO fights in Tajikistan, the repatriation of refugees to Afghanistan and the formation of a joint security unit to protect UNMOT personnel. All of these developments were welcomed by the council, which then expanded the UNMOT mandate to:

(a) co-operate in the election and referendum process;
(b) investigate report violations of the ceasefire;
(c) monitor the disarmament, demobilisation and reintegration of UTO troops;
(d) co-ordinate United Nations assistance to Tajikistan;
(e) maintain contacts with both parties, the Commonwealth of Independent States peacekeeping force and Organization for Security and Co-operation in Europe.

The intention of the Secretary-General Kofi Annan to convene a donor conference to provide funds for the operations in Tajikistan was welcomed. He was finally asked to report within three months on the implementation of the current resolution.

== See also ==
- Civil war in Tajikistan
- History of Tajikistan
- List of United Nations Security Council Resolutions 1101 to 1200 (1997–1998)
