= United Nations Security Council Resolution 1109 =

UN Security Council Resolution 1109
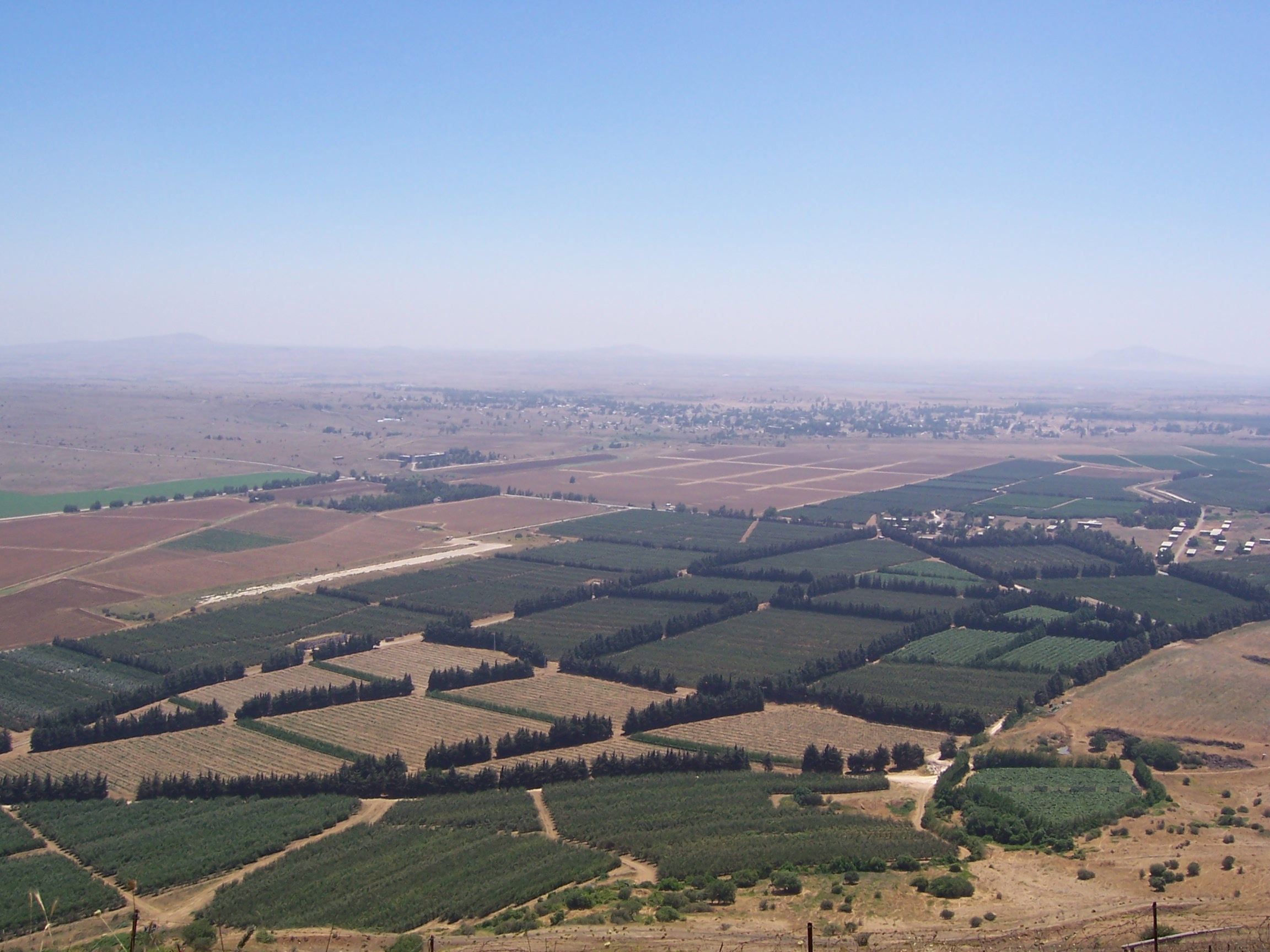
- Golan Heights border
- Date: 28 May 1997
- Meeting no.: 3,782
- Code: S/RES/1109 (Document)
- Subject: The situation in the Middle East
- Voting summary: 15 voted for; None voted against; None abstained
- Result: Adopted

Security Council composition
- Permanent members: China; France; Russia; United Kingdom; United States
- Non-permanent members: Chile; Costa Rica; Egypt; Guinea-Bissau; Japan; Kenya; South Korea; Poland; Portugal; Sweden

United Nations Security Council resolution 1109, adopted unanimously on 28 May 1997, after considering a report by the Secretary-General Kofi Annan regarding the United Nations Disengagement Observer Force (UNDOF), the Council noted its efforts to establish a durable and just peace in the Middle East.

The resolution called upon the parties concerned to immediately implement Resolution 338 (1973). It renewed the mandate of the Observer Force for another six months until 30 November 1997 and requested that the Secretary-General submit a report on the situation at the end of that period.

The Secretary-General's report noted that while no violations of the ceasefire had occurred and the situation between Israel and Syria remained calm, there were still restrictions on the freedom of movement of UNDOF in some areas.

== See also ==
- Arab–Israeli conflict
- Golan Heights
- Israel–Syria relations
- List of United Nations Security Council Resolutions 1101 to 1200 (1997–1998)
