= United Nations Security Council Resolution 1200 =

UN Security Council Resolution 1200
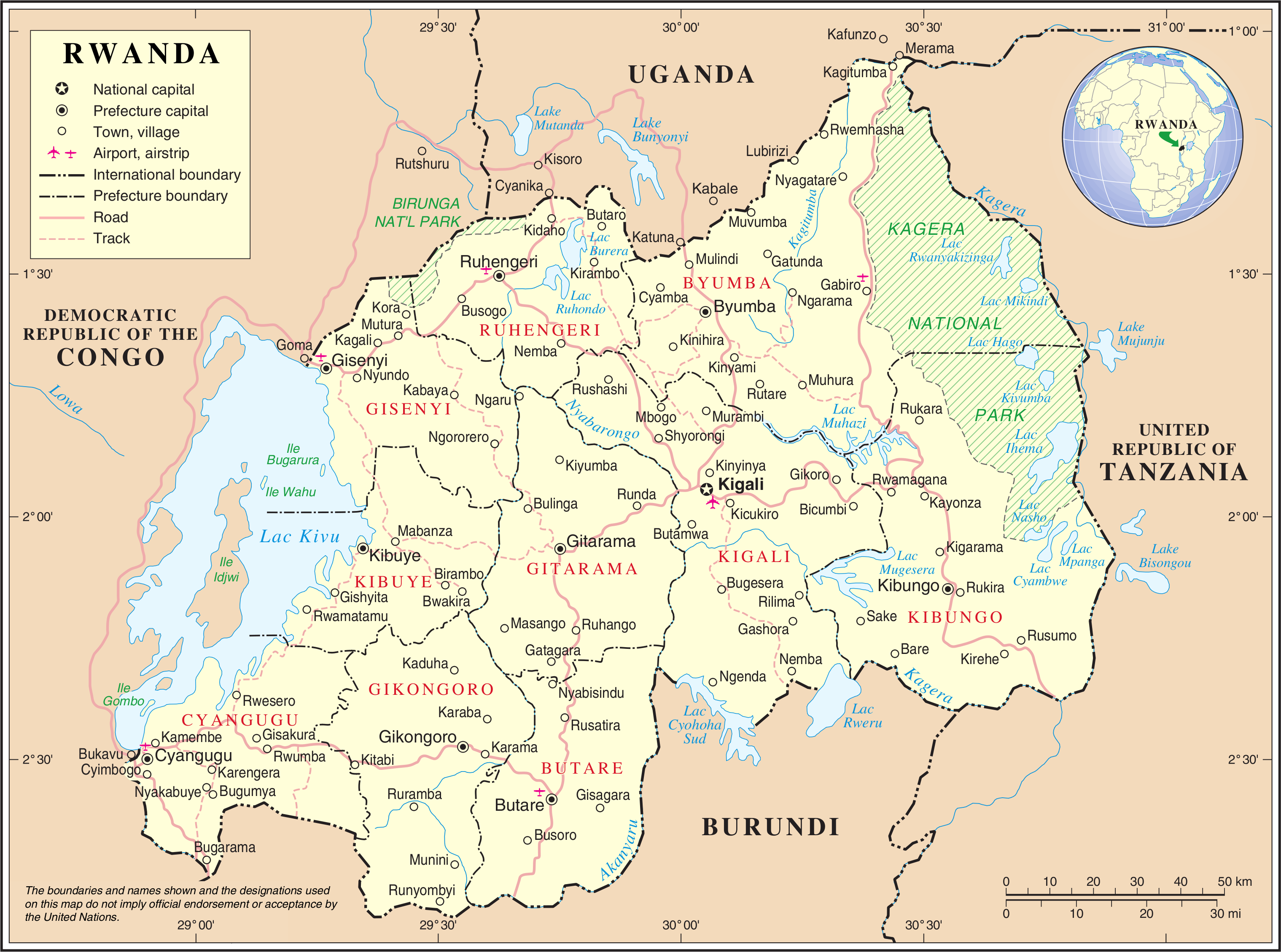
- Rwanda
- Date: 30 September 1998
- Meeting no.: 3,934
- Code: S/RES/1200 (Document)
- Subject: The International Tribunal for Rwanda
- Voting summary: 15 voted for; None voted against; None abstained
- Result: Adopted

Security Council composition
- Permanent members: China; France; Russia; United Kingdom; United States
- Non-permanent members: Bahrain; Brazil; Costa Rica; Gabon; Gambia; Japan; Kenya; Portugal; Slovenia; Sweden

United Nations Security Council resolution 1200, adopted unanimously on 30 September 1998, after recalling resolutions 955 (1994), 989 (1995) and 1165 (1998), the Council forwarded 18 nominations for judges at the International Criminal Tribunal for Rwanda (ICTR) to the General Assembly for consideration.

The list of nominations was as follows:

- Eugénie Liliane Arivony (Madagascar)
- Pavel Dolenc (Slovenia)
- Salifou Fomba (Mali)
- Willy C. Gaa (Philippines)
- Asoka de Z. Gunawardena (Sri Lanka)
- Mehmet Güney (Turkey)
- Aka Edoukou Jean-Baptiste Kablan (Côte d'Ivoire)
- Laïty Kama (Senegal)
- Dionysios Kondylis (Greece)
- Bouba Mahamane (Niger)
- Erik Møse (Norway)
- Yakov Ostrovsky (Russia)
- Cheick Dimkinsedo Ouédraogo (Burkina Faso)
- Navanethem Pillay (South Africa)
- Indira Rana (Nepal)
- William Sekule (Tanzania)
- Tilahun Teshome (Ethiopia)
- Lloyd George Williams (Jamaica and St. Kitts and Nevis)

Nine judges were later selected by the General Assembly in November 1998 to serve four years until May 2003: Pavel Dolenc, Mehmet Güney, Laïty Kama, Dionysios Kondylis, Erik Mose, Yakov Ostrovsky, Navanethem Pillay, William Sekule and Lloyd George Williams.

== See also ==
- List of United Nations Security Council Resolutions 1101 to 1200 (1997–1998)
- Rwandan genocide
- United Nations Observer Mission Uganda–Rwanda
