= United Nations Security Council Resolution 1128 =

UN Security Council Resolution 1128
- Tajikistan in Central Asia
- Date: 12 September 1997
- Meeting no.: 3,816
- Code: S/RES/1128 (Document)
- Subject: The situation in Tajikistan and along the Tajik–Afghan border
- Voting summary: 15 voted for; None voted against; None abstained
- Result: Adopted

Security Council composition
- Permanent members: China; France; Russia; United Kingdom; United States
- Non-permanent members: Chile; Costa Rica; Egypt; Guinea-Bissau; Japan; Kenya; South Korea; Poland; Portugal; Sweden

United Nations Security Council resolution 1128, adopted unanimously on 12 September 1997, after recalling all resolutions on the situation in Tajikistan and along the Tajik-Afghan border, the Council extended the mandate of the United Nations Mission of Observers in Tajikistan (UNMOT) for a period of two months until 15 November 1997.

The Council observed that talks between the Tajikistan government and United Tajik Opposition were successfully completed and an agreement was concluded on 27 June 1997. It was noted that the implementation of the General Agreement would require the effort of all parties and the support of the United Nations and the international community, particularly as the situation in Tajikistan remained volatile.

As recommendations from the Secretary-General regarding the expansion of UNMOT's mandate were approved, the parties were called upon to fully implement the General Agreement and to resume work on the Commission on National Reconciliation in the capital Dushanbe. They also had to guarantee the safety and freedom of movement of United Nations, Commonwealth of Independent States (CIS) and other international peacekeeping personnel.

The resolution concluded by directing the Secretary-General Kofi Annan to provide additional ways to ensure the safety of United Nations personnel and to keep the Council informed on developments in Tajikistan.

== See also ==
- Tajikistani Civil War
- History of Tajikistan
- List of United Nations Security Council Resolutions 1101 to 1200 (1997–1998)
