= United Nations Security Council Resolution 1149 =

UN Security Council Resolution 1149
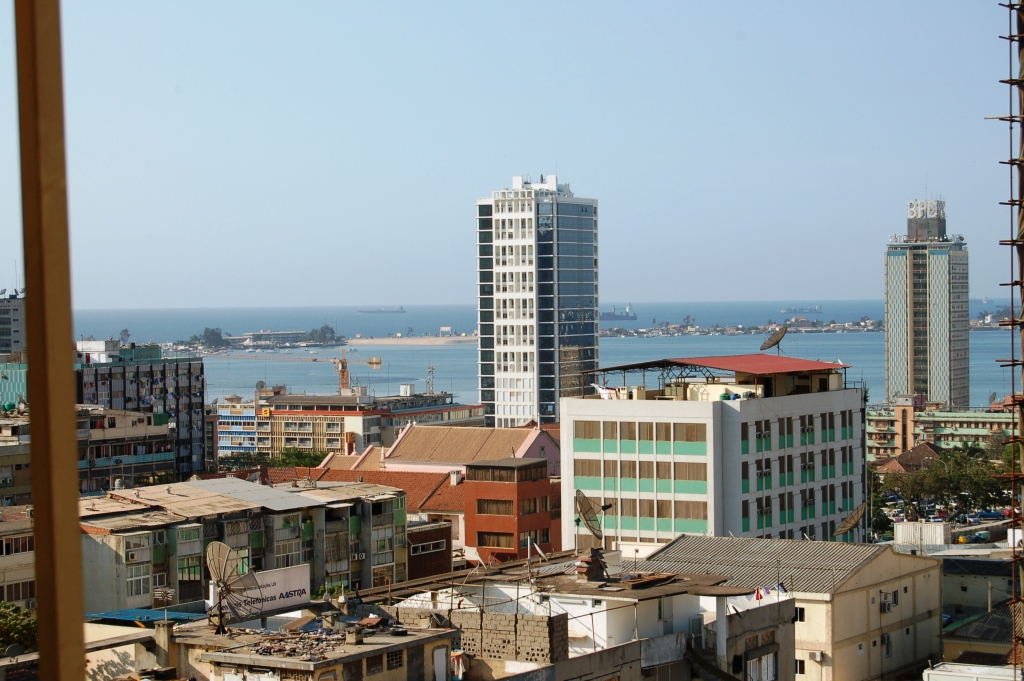
- Angolan capital Luanda
- Date: 27 January 1998
- Meeting no.: 3,850
- Code: S/RES/1149 (Document)
- Subject: The situation in Angola
- Voting summary: 15 voted for; None voted against; None abstained
- Result: Adopted

Security Council composition
- Permanent members: China; France; Russia; United Kingdom; United States
- Non-permanent members: Bahrain; Brazil; Costa Rica; Gabon; Gambia; Japan; Kenya; Portugal; Slovenia; Sweden

United Nations Security Council resolution 1149, adopted unanimously on 27 January 1998, after reaffirming Resolution 696 (1991) and all subsequent resolutions on Angola, the Council extended the mandate of the United Nations Observer Mission in Angola (MONUA) until 30 April 1998.

The Security Council welcomed an agreement between the Government of Angola and UNITA for implementing the remaining tasks of the Lusaka Protocol. MONUA was recognised as playing a critical role at this stage in the peace process. The Secretary-General was instructed to submit a report no later than 13 March 1998 regarding the implementation of the timetable, the possible reorganisation of MONUA and recommendations on a United Nations presence after 30 April 1998.

After calling for all agreements to be implemented in a timely manner, the resolution stressed the need for Angolan law to be strengthened and to create a secure environment for United Nations and humanitarian personnel. UNITA in particular was called upon to refrain from actions that would lead to increased tensions or hinder the normalisation of state administration throughout the country, and to co-operate with MONUA. The Council reaffirmed its readiness to impose further measures, in accordance with Resolution 1127 (1997), if UNITA did not comply and allow access for verification activities.

Finally, the resolution concluded by stating that a summit meeting between the President of Angola José Eduardo dos Santos and the leader of UNITA Jonas Savimbi could reduce the tension and help the Angolan peace process.

== See also ==
- Angolan Civil War
- List of United Nations Security Council Resolutions 1101 to 1200 (1997–1998)
- United Nations Angola Verification Mission I
- United Nations Angola Verification Mission II
- United Nations Angola Verification Mission III
