= United Nations Security Council Resolution 1185 =

UN Security Council Resolution 1185
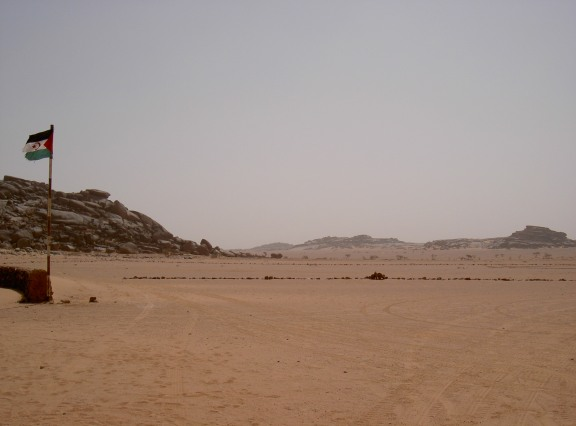
- Polisario territory near Tifariti
- Date: 20 July 1998
- Meeting no.: 3,910
- Code: S/RES/1185 (Document)
- Subject: The situation concerning Western Sahara
- Voting summary: 15 voted for; None voted against; None abstained
- Result: Adopted

Security Council composition
- Permanent members: China; France; Russia; United Kingdom; United States
- Non-permanent members: Bahrain; Brazil; Costa Rica; Gabon; Gambia; Japan; Kenya; Portugal; Slovenia; Sweden

United Nations Security Council resolution 1185, adopted unanimously on 20 July 1998, after reaffirming all previous resolutions on the Western Sahara, the Council extended the mandate of the United Nations Mission for the Referendum in Western Sahara (MINURSO) until 21 September 1998 so that it could proceed with voter identification tasks.

MINURSO, the Secretary-General Kofi Annan and his Special Envoy and Special Representative were all working in Western Sahara to assist in the implementation of the Settlement Plan which included a referendum on self-determination for the people of the territory. The responsibility of the voter identification process was with the Identification Commission.

Both Morocco and the Polisario Front were instructed to co-operate with the United Nations during the voter identification process. The resolution noted the continuing deployment of engineering units for demining activities and administrative staff required to support the deployment of military personnel. The council would consider additional deployments only when it became necessary. It called for the prompt conclusion of Status of Forces Agreements in relation to the military and demining units, and for restrictions on MINURSO aircraft to be lifted.

Finally, the secretary-general was requested to report every 30 days from the extension of MINURSO concerning developments in the territory and MINURSO's mandate.

== See also ==
- Free Zone (region)
- History of Western Sahara
- List of United Nations Security Council Resolutions 1101 to 1200 (1997–1998)
- Sahrawi Arab Democratic Republic
- Wall (Western Sahara)
