= United Nations Security Council Resolution 1126 =

UN Security Council Resolution 1126
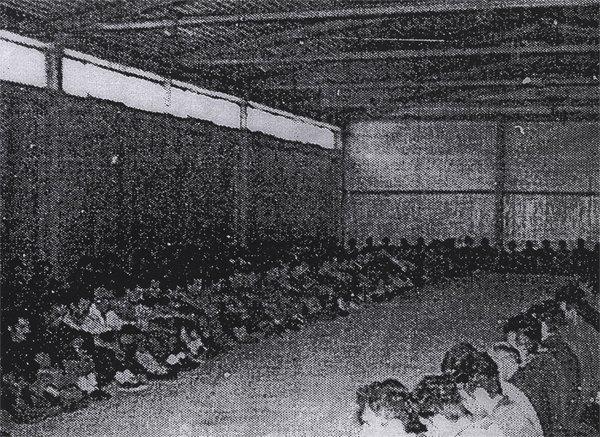
- Serbs from the Konjic area detained in the Čelebići camp. (Photograph provided courtesy of the ICTY)
- Date: 27 August 1997
- Meeting no.: 3,813
- Code: S/RES/1126 (Document)
- Subject: Tribunal of the Former Yugoslavia
- Voting summary: 15 voted for; None voted against; None abstained
- Result: Adopted

Security Council composition
- Permanent members: China; France; Russia; United Kingdom; United States
- Non-permanent members: Chile; Costa Rica; Egypt; Guinea-Bissau; Japan; Kenya; South Korea; Poland; Portugal; Sweden

United Nations Security Council resolution 1126, adopted unanimously on 27 August 1997, after receiving a letter from the Secretary-General Kofi Annan, the Council endorsed his recommendation that judges Karibi-Whyte, Odio Benito and Jan, once they were replaced, finish the Čelebići case that they began before they ended their term of office. It also noted the intention of the International Criminal Tribunal for the former Yugoslavia to finish the case by November 1998.

Annan's letter stated that if the three judges could not complete the case, it would have been necessary to restart the trials of the suspects, which would prolong the trial and violate the right of the accused to due process of law.

The Čelebići case related to a prisoner of war camp in Bosnia and Herzegovina where detainees were tortured and murdered.

== See also ==
- Bosnian War
- Breakup of Yugoslavia
- Croatian War of Independence
- List of United Nations Security Council Resolutions 1101 to 1200 (1997–1998)
- Yugoslav Wars
- List of United Nations Security Council Resolutions related to the conflicts in former Yugoslavia
