= United Nations Security Council Resolution 1188 =

UN Security Council Resolution 1188
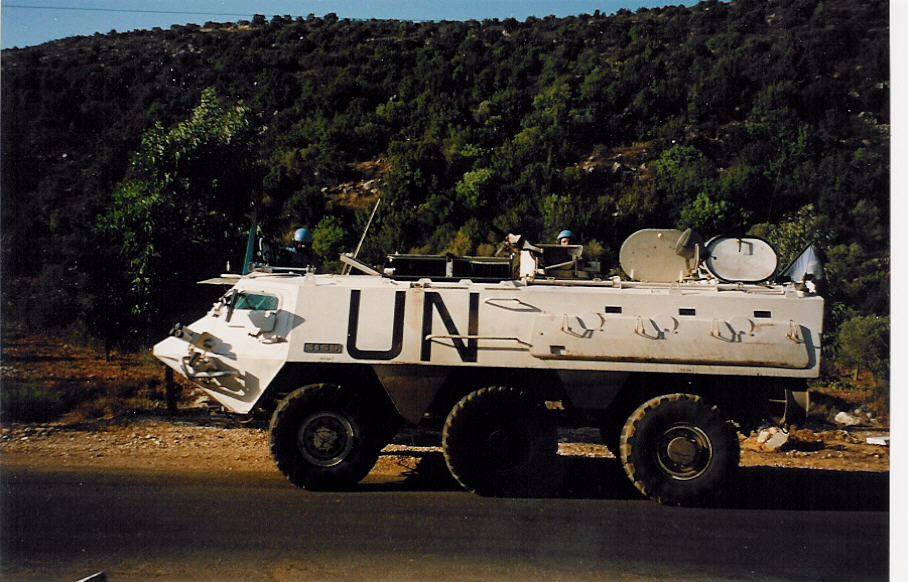
- UNIFIL unit (1998)
- Date: 30 July 1998
- Meeting no.: 3,913
- Code: S/RES/1188 (Document)
- Subject: The situation in the Middle East
- Voting summary: 15 voted for; None voted against; None abstained
- Result: Adopted

Security Council composition
- Permanent members: China; France; Russia; United Kingdom; United States
- Non-permanent members: Bahrain; Brazil; Costa Rica; Gabon; Gambia; Japan; Kenya; Portugal; Slovenia; Sweden

United Nations Security Council resolution 1188, adopted unanimously on 30 July 1998, after recalling previous resolutions on Israel and Lebanon including 501 (1982), 508 (1982), 509 (1982) and 520 (1982) as well as studying the report by the Secretary-General on the United Nations Interim Force in Lebanon (UNIFIL) approved in 426 (1978), the Council decided to extend the mandate of UNIFIL for a further six months until 31 January 1999.

The Council then reemphasised the mandate of the Force and requested the Secretary-General to continue negotiations with the Government of Lebanon and other parties concerned with regard to the implementation of resolutions 425 (1978) and 426 (1978) and report thereon.

All violence against UNIFIL was condemned with the parties urged to put a stop to attacks on the Force. The Secretary-General Kofi Annan had reported that there was fighting in Southern Lebanon though the number of casualties had decreased. The situation remained volatile and there was harassment of UNIFIL personnel. Further efficiency savings were encouraged provided they did not affect the operational capacity of the operation.

== See also ==
- List of United Nations Security Council Resolutions 1101 to 1200 (1997–1998)
- South Lebanon conflict (1985–2000)
