= United Nations Security Council Resolution 1151 =

UN Security Council Resolution 1151
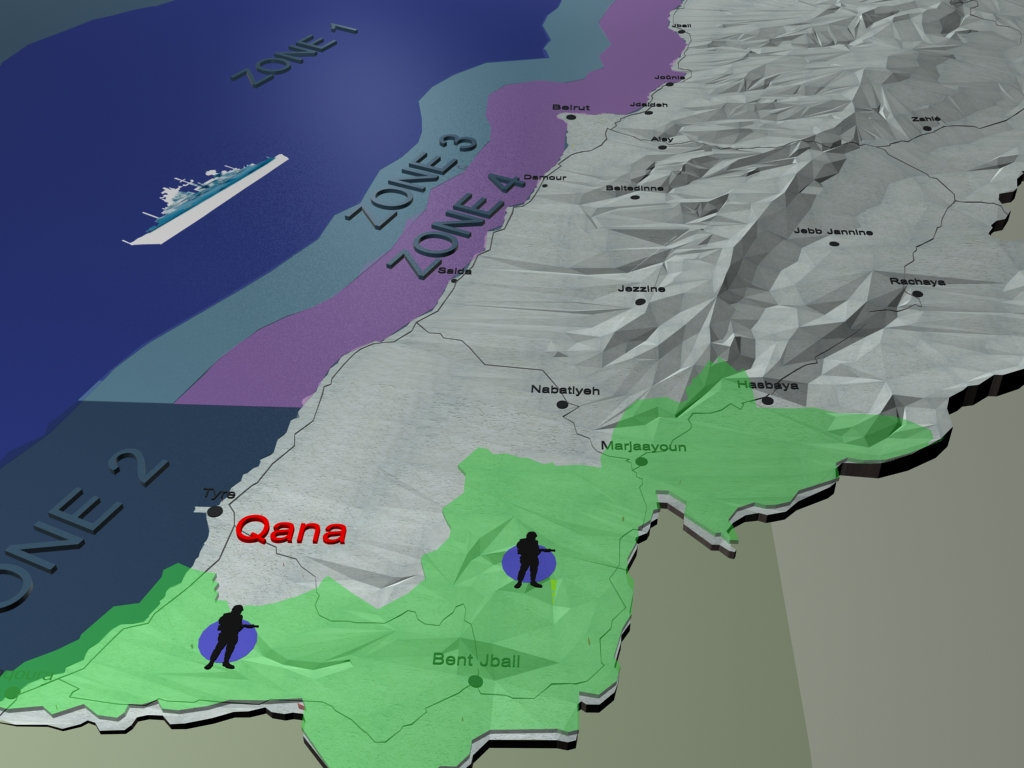
- UNIFIL area of operation
- Date: 30 January 1998
- Meeting no.: 3,852
- Code: S/RES/1151 (Document)
- Subject: The situation in the Middle East
- Voting summary: 15 voted for; None voted against; None abstained
- Result: Adopted

Security Council composition
- Permanent members: China; France; Russia; United Kingdom; United States
- Non-permanent members: Bahrain; Brazil; Costa Rica; Gabon; Gambia; Japan; Kenya; Portugal; Slovenia; Sweden

United Nations Security Council resolution 1151, adopted unanimously on 30 January 1998, after recalling previous resolutions on Israel and Lebanon including 501 (1982), 508 (1982), 509 (1982) and 520 (1982) as well as studying the report by the Secretary-General on the United Nations Interim Force in Lebanon (UNIFIL) approved in 426 (1978), the Council decided to extend the mandate of UNIFIL for a further six months until 31 July 1998.

The Council then reemphasised the mandate of the Force and requested the Secretary-General to continue negotiations with the Government of Lebanon and other parties concerned with regard to the implementation of resolutions 425 (1978) and 426 (1978) and report thereon.

All violence against UNIFIL was condemned with the parties urged to put a stop to attacks on the Force. The Secretary-General Kofi Annan had reported that tension had increased in the region, with 34 casualties compared to 9 in the previous reporting period; it had also recorded 249 operations or attacks against the Israel Defense Forces and South Lebanon Army. Further efficiency savings were encouraged provided they did not affect the operational capacity of the operation.

== See also ==
- List of United Nations Security Council Resolutions 1101 to 1200 (1997–1998)
- South Lebanon conflict (1985–2000)
