= United Nations Security Council Resolution 1167 =

United Nations Security Council resolution

UN Security Council Resolution 1167
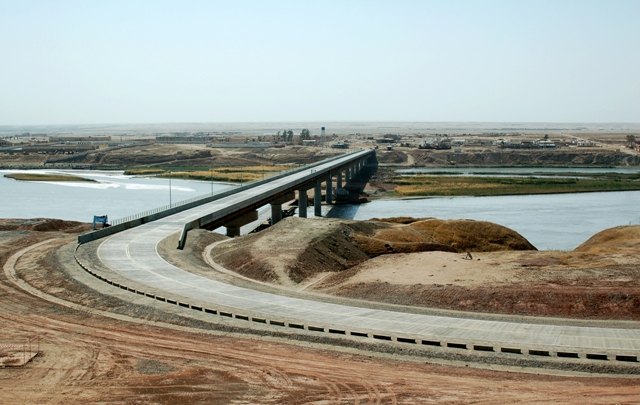
- Bridge between Tajikistan and Afghanistan
- Date: 14 May 1998
- Meeting no.: 3,879
- Code: S/RES/1167 (Document)
- Subject: The situation in Tajikistan and along the Tajik–Afghan border
- Voting summary: 15 voted for; None voted against; None abstained
- Result: Adopted

Security Council composition
- Permanent members: China; France; Russia; United Kingdom; United States
- Non-permanent members: Bahrain; Brazil; Costa Rica; Gabon; Gambia; Japan; Kenya; Portugal; Slovenia; Sweden

United Nations Security Council resolution 1167, adopted unanimously on 14 May 1998, after recalling all resolutions on the situation in Tajikistan and along the Tajik-Afghan border, the Council extended the mandate of the United Nations Mission of Observers in Tajikistan (UNMOT) for a further six months until 15 November 1998.

In the preamble of the resolution, it was noted that progress in the peace process was very slow, with violations of the ceasefire and a precarious situation in some parts of the country. Intensified contacts between the Government of Tajikistan and United Tajik Opposition (UTO) had helped to contain the crises.

The Security Council condemned renewed fighting in Tajikistan, calling upon all parties to implement peace and military agreements and the timetable proposed by the Commission on National Reconciliation including the appointment of UTO representatives to government positions. All measures were to be taken to create an environment to facilitate the holding of elections. The Tajik parties were also called upon to ensure the safety and security of UNMOT and peacekeeping forces from the Commonwealth of Independent States. Within three months of the adoption of the current resolution, the Secretary-General Kofi Annan was required to report on the implementation of Resolution 1167 and on all significant developments.

== See also ==
- Tajikistani Civil War
- History of Tajikistan
- List of United Nations Security Council Resolutions 1101 to 1200 (1997–1998)
