= United Nations Security Council Resolution 1116 =

UN Security Council Resolution 1116
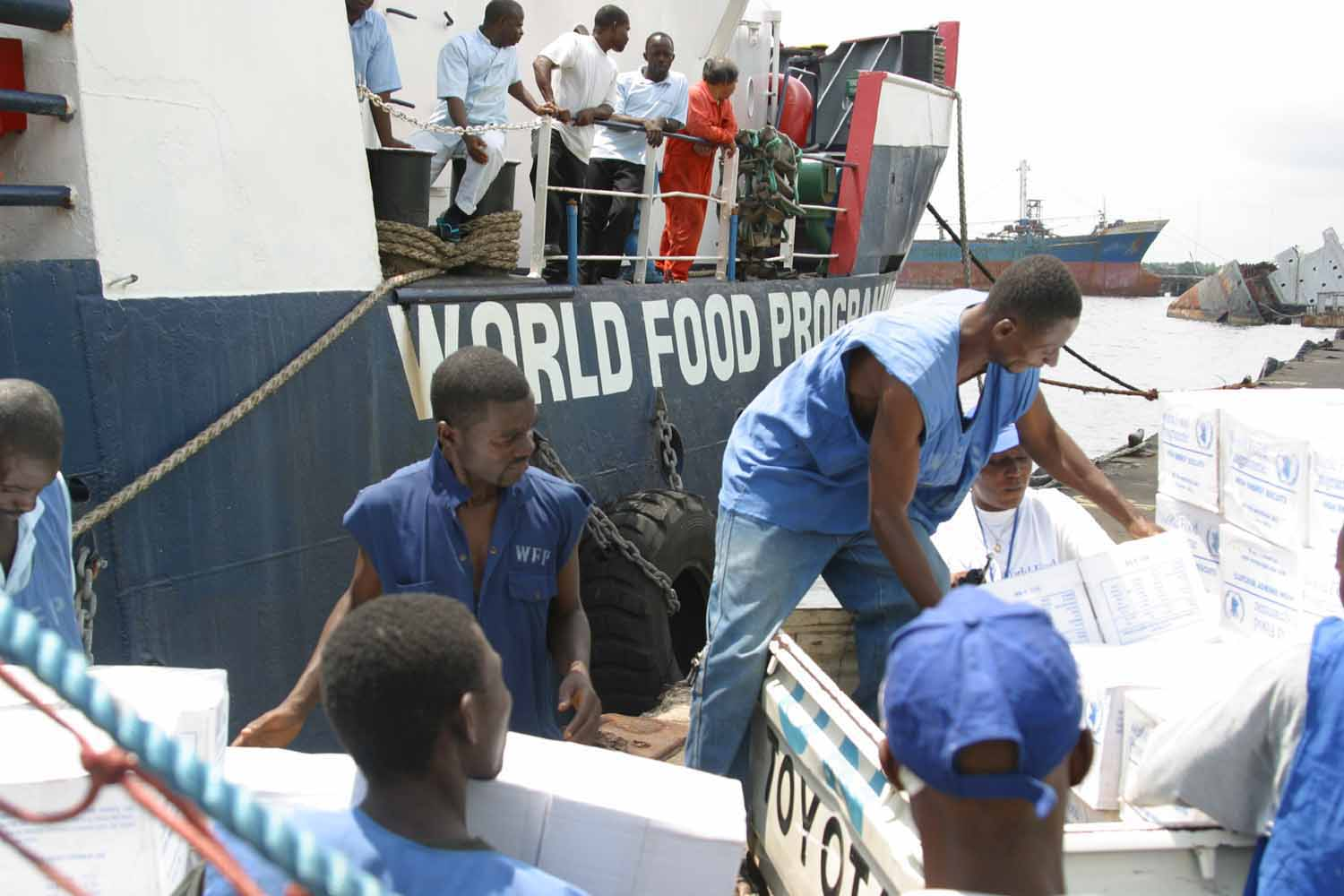
- World Food Programme in Liberia
- Date: 27 June 1997
- Meeting no.: 3,793
- Code: S/RES/1116 (Document)
- Subject: The situation in Liberia
- Voting summary: 15 voted for; None voted against; None abstained
- Result: Adopted

Security Council composition
- Permanent members: China; France; Russia; United Kingdom; United States
- Non-permanent members: Chile; Costa Rica; Egypt; Guinea-Bissau; Japan; Kenya; South Korea; Poland; Portugal; Sweden

United Nations Security Council resolution 1116, adopted unanimously on 27 June 1997, after recalling all resolutions on the situation in Liberia, particularly Resolution 1100 (1997), the Council extended the mandate of the United Nations Observer Mission in Liberia (UNOMIL) until 30 September 1997 with the expectation that it will terminate on that date.

The council noted the decision of the Economic Community of West African States (ECOWAS) to postpone the date of the general election until 19 July 1997. The importance of the elections in the peace process was emphasised and that UNOMIL was mandated to monitor and verify the electoral process in accordance with Resolution 866 (1993).

The Liberian parties were called upon to implement the peace agreements they entered into and for the Liberian people to participate peacefully in the electoral process. At the same time, the assistance of the international community was welcomed and the need for collaboration between the United Nations, ECOWAS, the Liberian National Election Commission and the international community in co-ordinating assistance for the elections was emphasised by the council.

Furthermore, strict compliance with the arms embargo imposed in Resolution 788 (1992) against Liberia by all countries was stressed, with violations reported to the committee established in Resolution 985 (1995). The Secretary-General Kofi Annan was instructed to report to the council on the elections and situation in the country by 29 August 1997. It was the last Security Council resolution concerning the First Liberian Civil War.

== See also ==
- Abuja Accord (Liberia)
- Charles Taylor
- Elections in Liberia
- First Liberian Civil War
- List of United Nations Security Council Resolutions 1101 to 1200 (1997–1998)
