= List of United Nations Security Council Resolutions 1101 to 1200 =

This is a list of United Nations Security Council Resolutions 1101 to 1200 adopted between 28 March 1997 and 30 September 1998.

Resolution	Date	Vote	Concerns
1101	28 March 1997	14–0–1 (abstention: China)	Establishes multinational protection force in Albania during the 1997 rebellion
1102	31 March 1997	15–0–0	Extends mandate of the United Nations Angola Verification Mission III
1103	31 March 1997	15–0–0	Increases strength of the United Nations Mission in Bosnia and Herzegovina
1104	8 April 1997	15–0–0	Nominations for judges at the International Criminal Tribunal for the former Yugoslavia
1105	9 April 1997	15–0–0	Suspends reduction of the military component of the United Nations Preventive Deployment Force in Macedonia
1106	16 April 1997	15–0–0	Extends mandate of the United Nations Angola Verification Mission III; withdrawal of military units
1107	16 May 1997	15–0–0	Increases number of police personnel as part of the United Nations Mission in Bosnia and Herzegovina
1108	22 May 1997	15–0–0	Extends mandate of the United Nations Mission for the Referendum in Western Sahara
1109	28 May 1997	15–0–0	Extends mandate of the United Nations Disengagement Observer Force
1110	28 May 1997	15–0–0	Extends mandate of the United Nations Preventive Deployment Force
1111	4 June 1997	15–0–0	Extends Oil-for-Food Programme in Iraq
1112	12 June 1997	15–0–0	Appoints Carlos Westendorp as High Representative for Bosnia and Herzegovina
1113	12 June 1997	15–0–0	Extends mandate of the United Nations Mission of Observers in Tajikistan
1114	19 June 1997	14–0–1 (abstention: China)	Temporarily extends mandate of the multinational force in Albania
1115	21 June 1997	15–0–0	Iraq's refusal to allow access to sites by the United Nations Special Commission
1116	27 June 1997	15–0–0	Extends mandate of the United Nations Observer Mission in Liberia
1117	27 June 1997	15–0–0	Extends mandate of the United Nations Peacekeeping Force in Cyprus
1118	30 June 1997	15–0–0	Establishes the United Nations Observer Mission in Angola
1119	14 July 1997	15–0–0	Extends mandate of the United Nations Mission of Observers in Prevlaka
1120	14 July 1997	15–0–0	Extends mandate of the United Nations Transitional Authority for Eastern Slavonia, Baranja and Western Sirmium
1121	22 July 1997	15–0–0	Establishes the Dag Hammarskjöld Medal for peacekeeping
1122	29 July 1997	15–0–0	Extends mandate of the United Nations Interim Force in Lebanon
1123	30 July 1997	15–0–0	Establishes the United Nations Transition Mission in Haiti
1124	31 July 1997	15–0–0	Extends mandate of the United Nations Observer Mission in Georgia
1125	6 August 1997	15–0–0	Authorises continuation of the Inter-African Mission to Monitor the Implementation of the Bangui Agreements in the Central African Republic
1126	27 August 1997	15–0–0	Completion of cases at the International Criminal Tribunal for the former Yugoslavia by judges with terms due to expire
1127	28 August 1997	15–0–0	Imposes sanctions on UNITA for non-compliance with the Lusaka Protocol in Angola
1128	12 September 1997	15–0–0	Extends mandate of the United Nations Mission of Observers in Tajikistan
1129	12 September 1997	14–0–1 (abstention: Russia)	Extends Iraqi Oil-for-Food Programme
1130	29 September 1997	15–0–0	Suspends the coming-into-force of sanctions against UNITA in Angola
1131	29 September 1997	15–0–0	Extends mandate of the United Nations Mission for the Referendum in Western Sahara
1132	8 October 1997	15–0–0	Imposes oil and arms embargo on Sierra Leone during the civil war
1133	20 October 1997	15–0–0	Extends mandate of the United Nations Mission for the Referendum in Western Sahara
1134	23 October 1997	10–0–5 (abstentions: China, Egypt, France, Kenya, Russia)	Iraq's continued refusal to allow access to sites by the United Nations Special Commission
1135	29 October 1997	15–0–0	Extends mandate of the United Nations Observer Mission in Angola; withdrawal of military units
1136	6 November 1997	15–0–0	Authorises continuation of the Inter-African Mission to Monitor the Implementation of the Bangui Agreements in the Central African Republic
1137	12 November 1997	15–0–0	Imposes sanctions and travel bans on Iraq following non-compliance with the United Nations Special Commission
1138	14 November 1997	15–0–0	Extends mandate of the United Nations Mission of Observers in Tajikistan
1139	21 November 1997	15–0–0	Extends mandate of the United Nations Disengagement Observer Force
1140	28 November 1997	15–0–0	Extends mandate of the United Nations Preventive Deployment Force
1141	28 November 1997	15–0–0	Establishes the United Nations Civilian Police Mission in Haiti
1142	4 December 1997	15–0–0	Extends mandate of the United Nations Preventive Deployment Force for a final time
1143	4 December 1997	15–0–0	Extends Iraqi Oil-for-Food Programme
1144	19 December 1997	15–0–0	Extends mandate of the United Nations Mission in Bosnia and Herzegovina, including the International Police Task Force
1145	19 December 1997	15–0–0	Establishes support group of civilian police monitors in the Danube region
1146	23 December 1997	15–0–0	Extends mandate of the United Nations Peacekeeping Force in Cyprus
1147	13 January 1998	15–0–0	Extends mandate of the United Nations Mission of Observers in Prevlaka
1148	26 January 1998	15–0–0	Conditions for the identification process for the referendum in Western Sahara
1149	27 January 1998	15–0–0	Extends mandate of the United Nations Observer Mission in Angola
1150	30 January 1998	15–0–0	Extends mandate of the United Nations Observer Mission in Georgia
1151	30 January 1998	15–0–0	Extends mandate of the United Nations Interim Force in Lebanon
1152	5 February 1998	15–0–0	Extends mandate of the Mission interafricaine de surveillance des Accords de Bangui
1153	20 February 1998	15–0–0	Measures to facilitate the delivery of humanitarian aid to the Iraqi people
1154	2 March 1998	15–0–0	Acceptance by Iraq of the conditions of Resolution 687 (1991)
1155	16 March 1998	15–0–0	Extends mandate of the Mission interafricaine de surveillance des Accords de Bangui
1156	16 March 1998	15–0–0	Terminates petroleum sanctions against Sierra Leone
1157	20 March 1998	15–0–0	Modalities of the United Nations presence in Angola
1158	25 March 1998	15–0–0	Extends Iraqi Oil-for-Food Programme
1159	27 March 1998	15–0–0	Establishes the United Nations Mission in the Central African Republic
1160	31 March 1998	14–0–1 (abstention: China)	Imposes arms embargo against the Federal Republic of Yugoslavia (Serbia and Montenegro)
1161	9 April 1998	15–0–0	Reactivates international commission of inquiry to investigate violations of arms embargo against Rwanda
1162	17 April 1998	15–0–0	Deploys military liaison and security advisory personnel to Sierra Leone
1163	17 April 1998	15–0–0	Extends mandate of the United Nations Mission for the Referendum in Western Sahara
1164	29 April 1998	15–0–0	Extends mandate of the United Nations Observer Mission in Angola
1165	30 April 1998	15–0–0	Establishes third trial chamber at the International Criminal Tribunal for Rwanda
1166	13 May 1998	15–0–0	Establishes third trial chamber at the International Criminal Tribunal for the former Yugoslavia
1167	14 May 1998	15–0–0	Extends mandate of the United Nations Mission of Observers in Tajikistan
1168	21 May 1998	15–0–0	Strengthens the International Police Task Force in Bosnia and Herzegovina
1169	27 May 1998	15–0–0	Extends mandate of the United Nations Disengagement Observer Force
1170	28 May 1998	15–0–0	Conflict prevention and peace and security in Africa
1171	5 June 1998	15–0–0	Terminates arms embargo against the Government of Sierra Leone; imposes travel ban
1172	6 June 1998	15–0–0	Condemns nuclear tests carried out by India and Pakistan
1173	12 June 1998	15–0–0	Imposes further sanctions against UNITA in Angola
1174	15 June 1998	15–0–0	Extends mandate of the United Nations Mission in Bosnia and Herzegovina
1175	19 June 1998	15–0–0	Permits states to provide equipment to Iraq allowing it to increase oil exports
1176	24 June 1998	15–0–0	Measures against UNITA in Angola
1177	26 June 1998	15–0–0	War between Eritrea and Ethiopia
1178	29 June 1998	15–0–0	Extends mandate of the United Nations Peacekeeping Force in Cyprus
1179	29 June 1998	15–0–0	Settlement of the Cyprus dispute
1180	29 June 1998	15–0–0	Extends mandate of the United Nations Observer Mission in Angola; resumes withdrawal of military component
1181	13 July 1998	15–0–0	Establishes the United Nations Observer Mission in Sierra Leone
1182	14 July 1998	15–0–0	Extends mandate of the United Nations Mission in the Central African Republic
1183	15 July 1998	15–0–0	Extends mandate of the United Nations Mission of Observers in Prevlaka
1184	16 July 1998	15–0–0	Establishes court monitoring programme in Bosnia and Herzegovina
1185	20 July 1998	15–0–0	Extends mandate of the United Nations Mission for the Referendum in Western Sahara
1186	21 July 1998	15–0–0	Extends mandate of the United Nations Preventive Deployment Force
1187	30 July 1998	15–0–0	Extends mandate of the United Nations Observer Mission in Georgia
1188	30 July 1998	15–0–0	Extends mandate of the United Nations Interim Force in Lebanon
1189	13 August 1998	15–0–0	Condemns terrorist bombings in Kenya and Tanzania
1190	13 August 1998	15–0–0	Extends mandate of the United Nations Observer Mission in Angola; dispatch of Special Envoy
1191	27 August 1998	15–0–0	Nominations for judges at the International Criminal Tribunal for the former Yugoslavia
1192	27 August 1998	15–0–0	Arrangements for trial of 2 Libyans for the bombing of Pan Am Flight 103
1193	28 August 1998	15–0–0	Civil war in Afghanistan
1194	9 September 1998	15–0–0	Iraq's decision to suspend co-operation with the International Atomic Energy Agency and United Nations Special Commission
1195	15 September 1998	15–0–0	Extends mandate of the United Nations Observer Mission in Angola
1196	16 September 1998	15–0–0	Monitoring of arms embargoes in Africa
1197	18 September 1998	15–0–0	Co-operation between the United Nations and Organisation of African Unity
1198	18 September 1998	15–0–0	Extends mandate of the United Nations Mission for the Referendum in Western Sahara
1199	23 September 1998	14–0–1 (abstention: China)	War in Kosovo
1200	30 September 1998	15–0–0	Nominations for judges at the International Criminal Tribunal for Rwanda

== See also ==
- Lists of United Nations Security Council resolutions
- List of United Nations Security Council Resolutions 1001 to 1100
- List of United Nations Security Council Resolutions 1201 to 1300
