= United Nations Security Council Resolution 1106 =

UN Security Council Resolution 1106
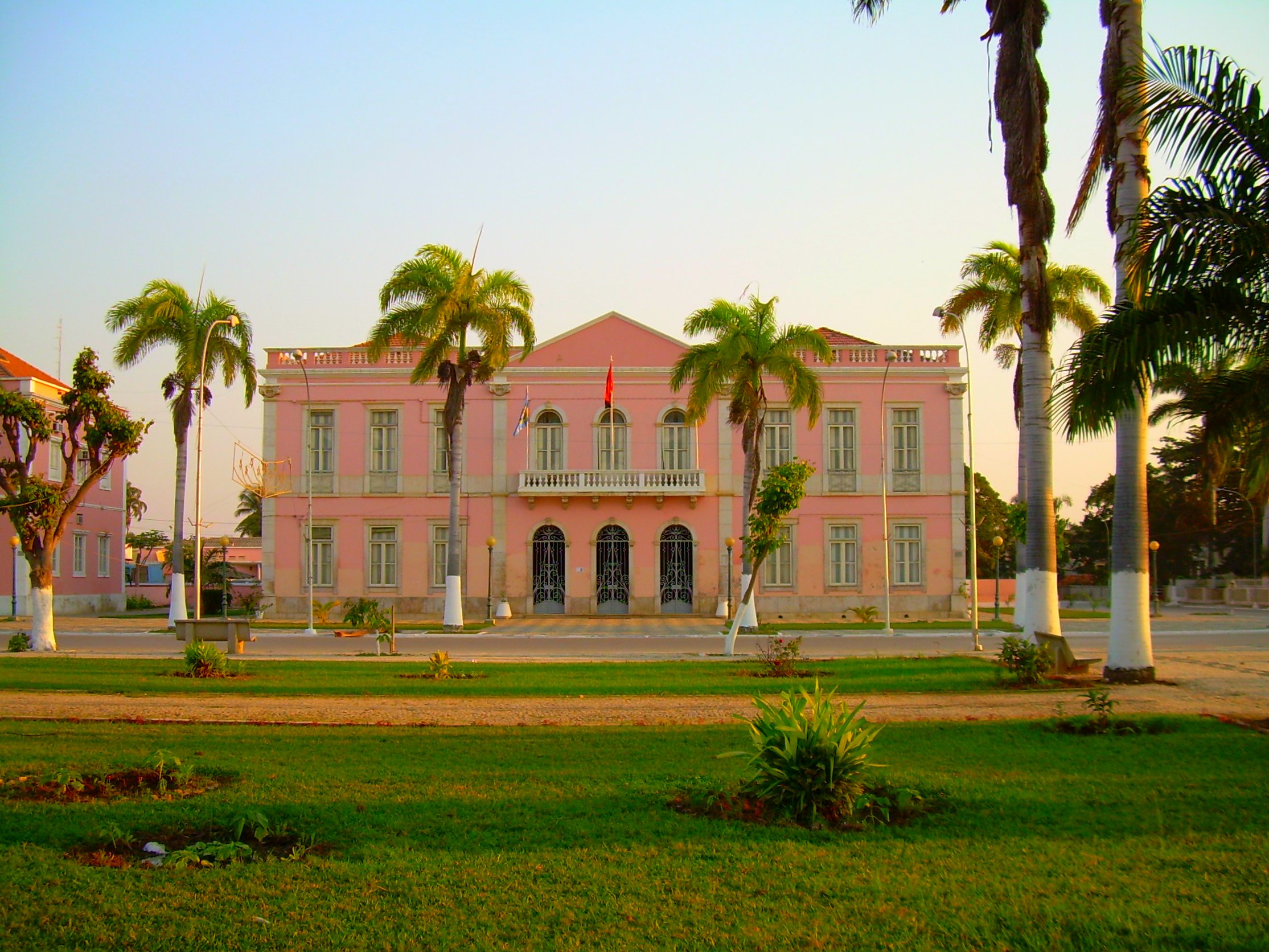
- City Hall in Benguela
- Date: 16 April 1997
- Meeting no.: 3,769
- Code: S/RES/1106 (Document)
- Subject: The situation in Angola
- Voting summary: 15 voted for; None voted against; None abstained
- Result: Adopted

Security Council composition
- Permanent members: China; France; Russia; United Kingdom; United States
- Non-permanent members: Chile; Costa Rica; Egypt; Guinea-Bissau; Japan; Kenya; South Korea; Poland; Portugal; Sweden

United Nations Security Council resolution 1106, adopted unanimously on 16 April 1997, after reaffirming Resolution 696 (1991) and all subsequent resolutions on Angola, the Council welcomed the establishment of the Government of Unity and National Reconciliation (GURN) and extended the mandate of the United Nations Angola Verification Mission III (UNAVEM III) until 30 June 1997.

The resolution noted the improving situation in Angola with regard to the peace process. The National Assembly approved the status of the leader of UNITA Jonas Savimbi as leader of the largest opposition party and at the same time, also approved UNITA deputies in the Assembly. UNITA had 4 out of 29 ministers and 7 out of 58 vice-ministers.

The Security Council welcomed the establishment of the GURN as called for in Resolution 1102 (1997). The parties were called upon to implement the other aspects of the peace process, such as the integration of UNITA soldiers into the Angolan Armed Forces, demobilisation and the improvement of state administration throughout the country. In this regard, the Council anticipated a meeting between the President of Angola José Eduardo dos Santos and the leader of UNITA Jonas Savimbi to contribute towards the process of national reconciliation.

UNAVEM III's mandate was extended so that it could assist in the implementation of the remaining aspects of the peace process. It was expected that UNAVEM III would begin the transition towards an observer mission with the withdrawal of the military component of the mission. Finally, the Secretary-General Kofi Annan was requested to submit a report to the council by 6 June 1997 regarding the costs, structure and goals of the proposed observer mission.

== See also ==
- Angolan Civil War
- List of United Nations Security Council Resolutions 1101 to 1200 (1997–1998)
- MONUA
- United Nations Angola Verification Mission I
- United Nations Angola Verification Mission II
