= United Nations Security Council Resolution 1195 =

UN Security Council Resolution 1195
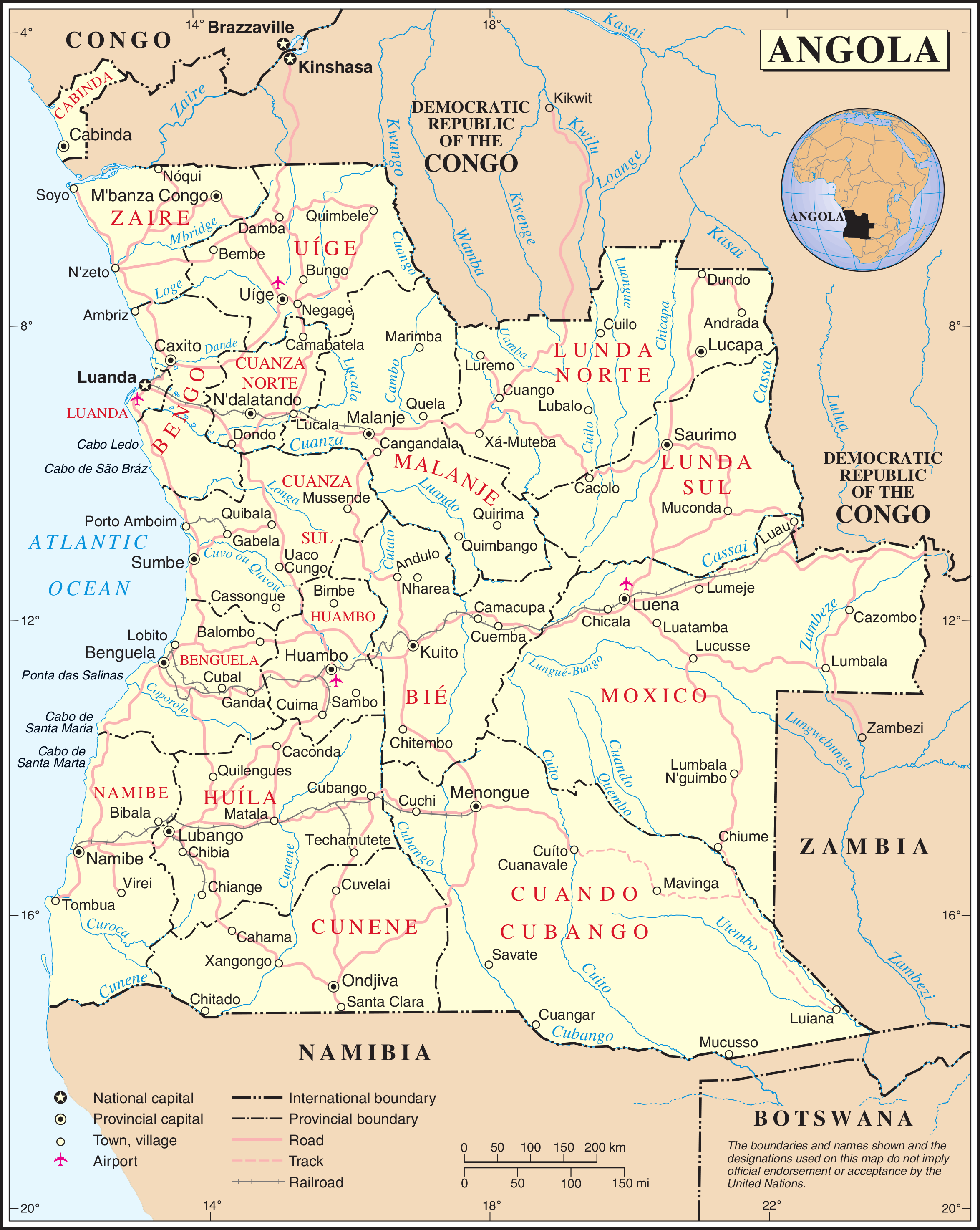
- Angola
- Date: 15 September 1998
- Meeting no.: 3,925
- Code: S/RES/1195 (Document)
- Subject: The situation in Angola
- Voting summary: 15 voted for; None voted against; None abstained
- Result: Adopted

Security Council composition
- Permanent members: China; France; Russia; United Kingdom; United States
- Non-permanent members: Bahrain; Brazil; Costa Rica; Gabon; Gambia; Japan; Kenya; Portugal; Slovenia; Sweden

United Nations Security Council resolution 1195, adopted unanimously on 15 September 1998, after reaffirming Resolution 696 (1991) and all subsequent resolutions on Angola, the Council extended the mandate of the United Nations Observer Mission in Angola (MONUA) for a month until 15 October 1998.

The security council stated that the current impasse in the peace process was due to the failure of UNITA to comply with its obligations under the Acordos de Paz, Lusaka Protocol and relevant Security Council resolutions, and demanded that it immediately comply, particularly with regard to the demilitarisation of its forces and extension of state authority throughout the country. Furthermore, it demanded that UNITA leave areas it had occupied through military means and transform itself into a political party. The Government of Angola was urged to reconsider its decision to suspend members of UNITA from the Government of Unity and National Reconciliation (GURN).

Member states were called upon to fully implement restrictions against UNITA imposed in resolutions 864 (1993), 1127 (1997) and 1173 (1998). Finally, the resolution endorsed the decision of the Secretary-General Kofi Annan to instruct MONUA to adjust its deployment on the ground in order to ensure the safety and security of MONUA personnel.

== See also ==
- Angolan Civil War
- List of United Nations Security Council Resolutions 1101 to 1200 (1997–1998)
- United Nations Angola Verification Mission I
- United Nations Angola Verification Mission II
- United Nations Angola Verification Mission III
