= United Nations Security Council Resolution 1198 =

United Nations Security Council resolution

UN Security Council Resolution 1198
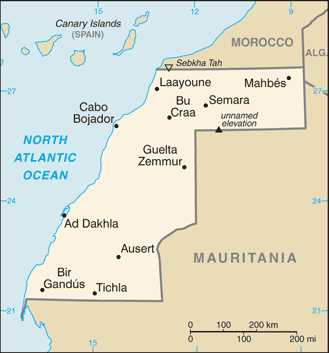
- Western Sahara
- Date: 18 September 1998
- Meeting no.: 3,929
- Code: S/RES/1198 (Document)
- Subject: The situation concerning Western Sahara
- Voting summary: 15 voted for; None voted against; None abstained
- Result: Adopted

Security Council composition
- Permanent members: China; France; Russia; United Kingdom; United States
- Non-permanent members: Bahrain; Brazil; Costa Rica; Gabon; Gambia; Japan; Kenya; Portugal; Slovenia; Sweden

United Nations Security Council resolution 1198, adopted unanimously on 18 September 1998, after reaffirming all previous resolutions on the Western Sahara, the Council extended the mandate of the United Nations Mission for the Referendum in Western Sahara (MINURSO) until 31 October 1998.

The Security Council reiterated its commitment to finding a lasting solution to the conflict in Western Sahara and its determination to hold a referendum on self-determination for the people of the territory in accordance with the Settlement Plan.

The resolution then welcomed the agreement of the Moroccan authorities to formalise the presence of the Office of the United Nations High Commissioner for Refugees (UNHCR) in the Western Sahara and both Morocco and the Polisario Front were urged to contribute to the return of refugees eligible to vote. It called for the conclusion of Status of Forces Agreements for the deployment of MINURSO military personnel. Within 30 days the Secretary-General Kofi Annan was requested to report on progress.

== See also ==
- Free Zone (region)
- History of Western Sahara
- List of United Nations Security Council Resolutions 1101 to 1200 (1997–1998)
- Sahrawi Arab Democratic Republic
- Moroccan Western Sahara Wall
