= United Nations Security Council Resolution 1122 =

UN Security Council Resolution 1122
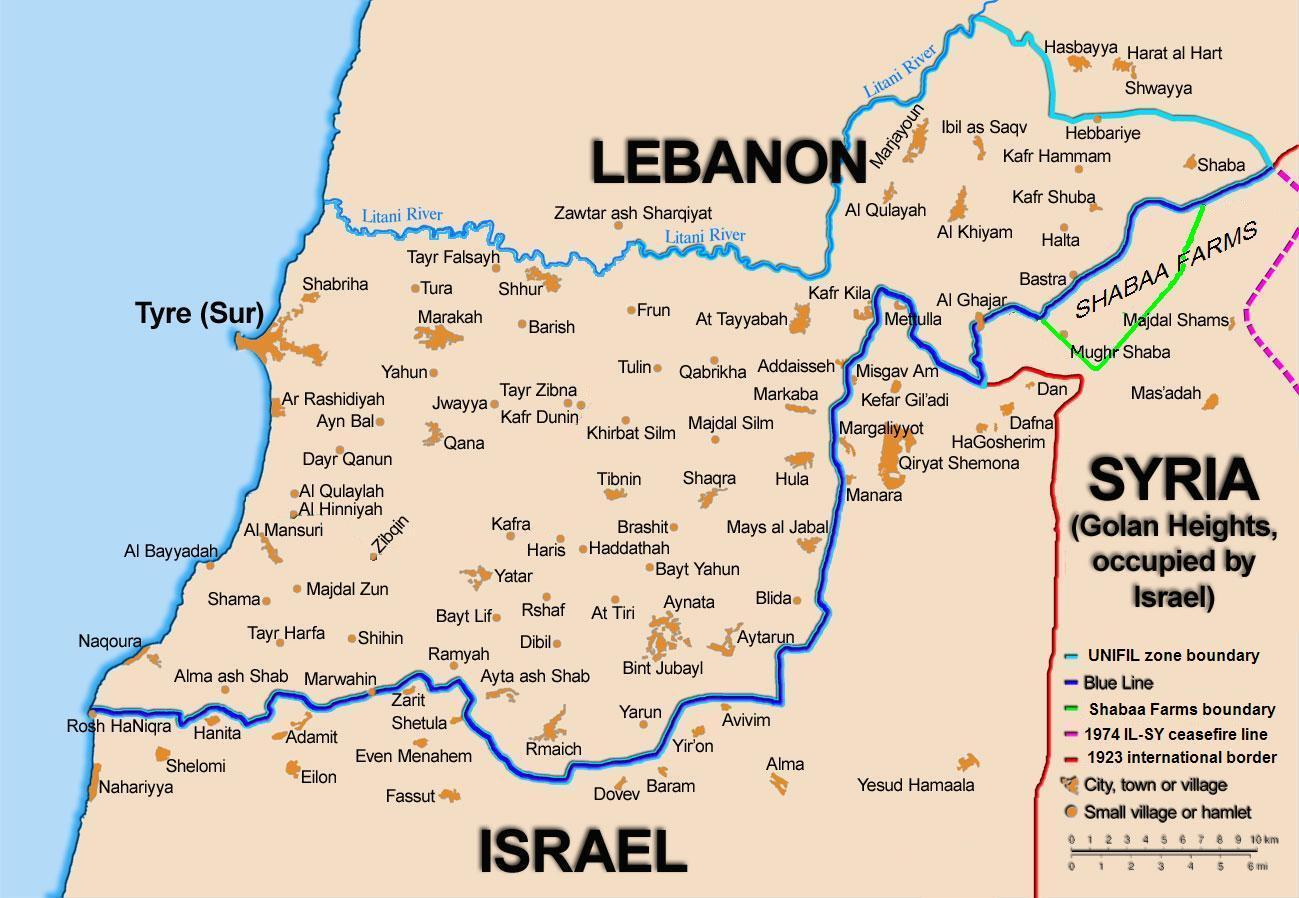
- Blue Line in southern Lebanon
- Date: 29 July 1997
- Meeting no.: 3,804
- Code: S/RES/1122 (Document)
- Subject: The situation in the Middle East
- Voting summary: 15 voted for; None voted against; None abstained
- Result: Adopted

Security Council composition
- Permanent members: China; France; Russia; United Kingdom; United States
- Non-permanent members: Chile; Costa Rica; Egypt; Guinea-Bissau; Japan; Kenya; South Korea; Poland; Portugal; Sweden

United Nations Security Council resolution 1122, adopted unanimously on 29 July 1997, after recalling previous resolutions on Israel and Lebanon including 501 (1982), 508 (1982), 509 (1982) and 520 (1982) as well as studying the report by the secretary-general on the United Nations Interim Force in Lebanon (UNIFIL) approved in 426 (1978), the council decided to extend the mandate of UNIFIL for a further six months until 31 January 1998.

The council then reemphasised the mandate of the force and requested the secretary-general to continue negotiations with the government of Lebanon and other parties concerned with regard to the implementation of resolutions 425 (1978) and 426 (1978) and report thereon.

All violence against UNIFIL was condemned, and further efficiency savings were encouraged provided they did not affect the operational capacity of the Force.

== See also ==
- List of United Nations Security Council Resolutions 1101 to 1200 (1997–1998)
- South Lebanon conflict (1985–2000)
