= United Nations Security Council Resolution 1130 =

UN Security Council Resolution 1130
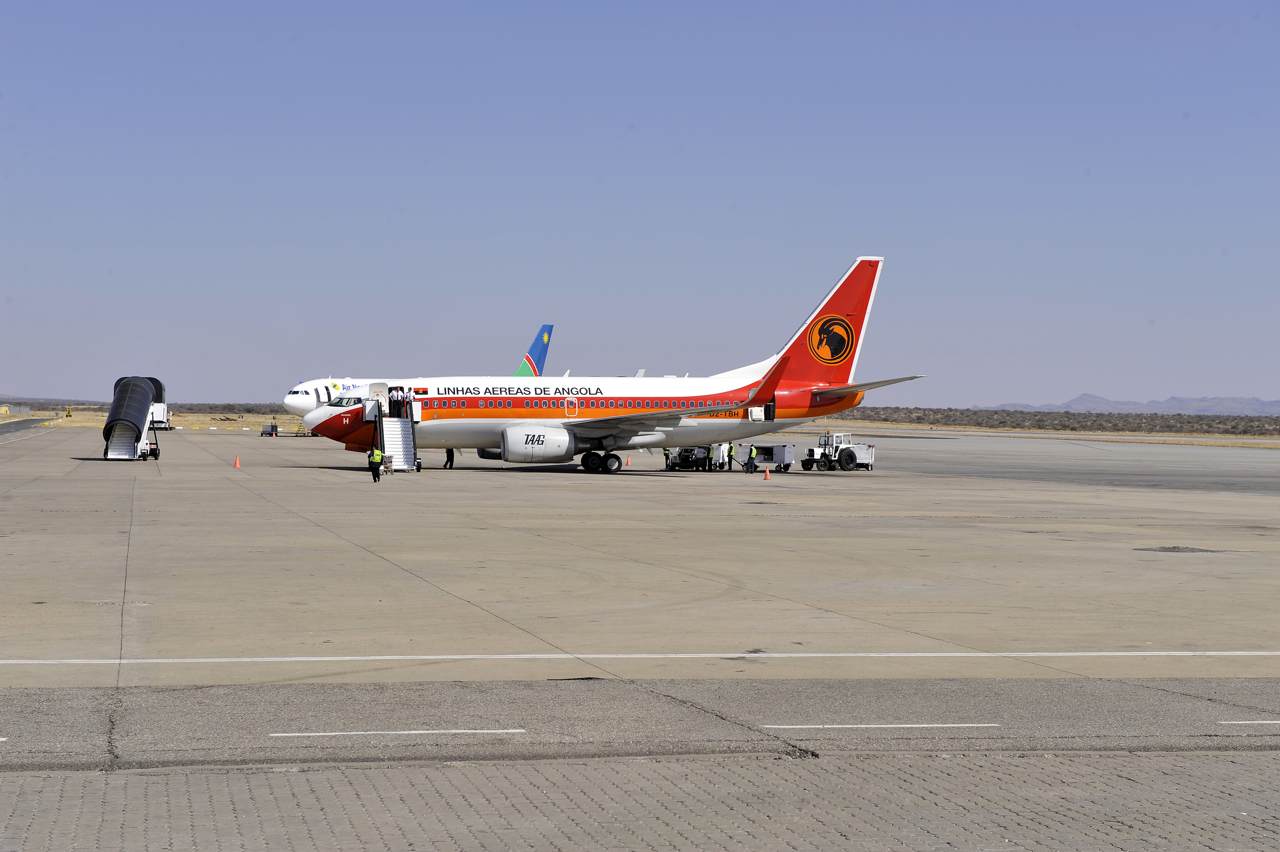
- TAAG Angola Airlines plane
- Date: 29 September 1997
- Meeting no.: 3,820
- Code: S/RES/1130 (Document)
- Subject: The situation in Angola
- Voting summary: 15 voted for; None voted against; None abstained
- Result: Adopted

Security Council composition
- Permanent members: China; France; Russia; United Kingdom; United States
- Non-permanent members: Chile; Costa Rica; Egypt; Guinea-Bissau; Japan; Kenya; South Korea; Poland; Portugal; Sweden

United Nations Security Council resolution 1130, adopted unanimously on 29 September 1997, after reaffirming Resolution 696 (1991) and all subsequent resolutions on Angola, particularly Resolution 1127 (1997), the council, acting under Chapter VII of the United Nations Charter, suspended the enactment of travel restrictions against UNITA until 00:01 EST on 30 October 1997.

The council stressed that UNITA comply with the provisions in Resolution 1127, noting that further non-compliance would leave the council to consider the imposition of additional measures against it. UNITA was required to demilitarise its troops, complete the transformation of its radio station Vorgan into a non-partisan broadcasting station, and extend the authority of the state to the areas controlled by it.

== See also ==
- Angolan Civil War
- Lusaka Protocol
- List of United Nations Security Council Resolutions 1101 to 1200 (1997–1998)
- United Nations Angola Verification Mission I
- United Nations Angola Verification Mission II
- United Nations Angola Verification Mission III
