= United Nations Security Council Resolution 1169 =

UN Security Council Resolution 1169
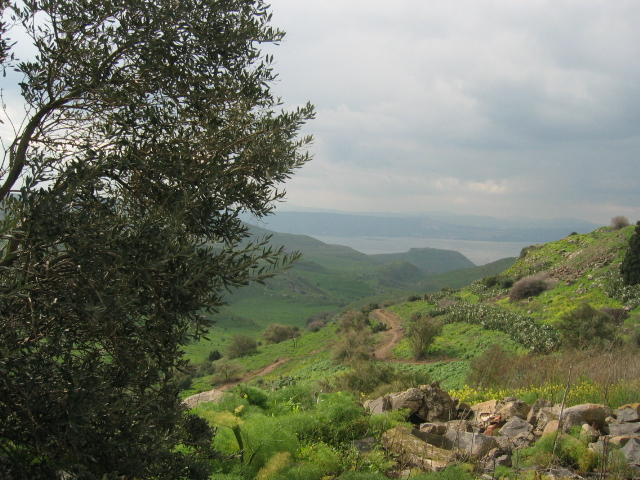
- The Golan Heights
- Date: 27 May 1998
- Meeting no.: 3,885
- Code: S/RES/1169 (Document)
- Subject: The situation in the Middle East
- Voting summary: 15 voted for; None voted against; None abstained
- Result: Adopted

Security Council composition
- Permanent members: China; France; Russia; United Kingdom; United States
- Non-permanent members: Bahrain; Brazil; Costa Rica; Gabon; Gambia; Japan; Kenya; Portugal; Slovenia; Sweden

United Nations Security Council resolution 1169, adopted unanimously on 27 May 1998, after considering a report by the Secretary-General Kofi Annan regarding the United Nations Disengagement Observer Force (UNDOF), the Council extended its mandate for a further six months until 30 November 1998.

The resolution called upon the parties concerned to immediately implement Resolution 338 (1973) and requested that the Secretary-General submit a report on the situation at the end of that period.

The Secretary-General's report pursuant to the previous resolution on UNDOF said that the situation between Israel and Syria had remained calm though the situation in the Middle East as a whole remained dangerous until a settlement could be reached. Meanwhile, some restrictions by both sides on the freedom of movement of UNDOF were reported.

== See also ==
- Arab–Israeli conflict
- Golan Heights
- Israel–Syria relations
- List of United Nations Security Council Resolutions 1101 to 1200 (1997–1998)
