= United Nations Security Council Resolution 1104 =

UN Security Council Resolution 1104
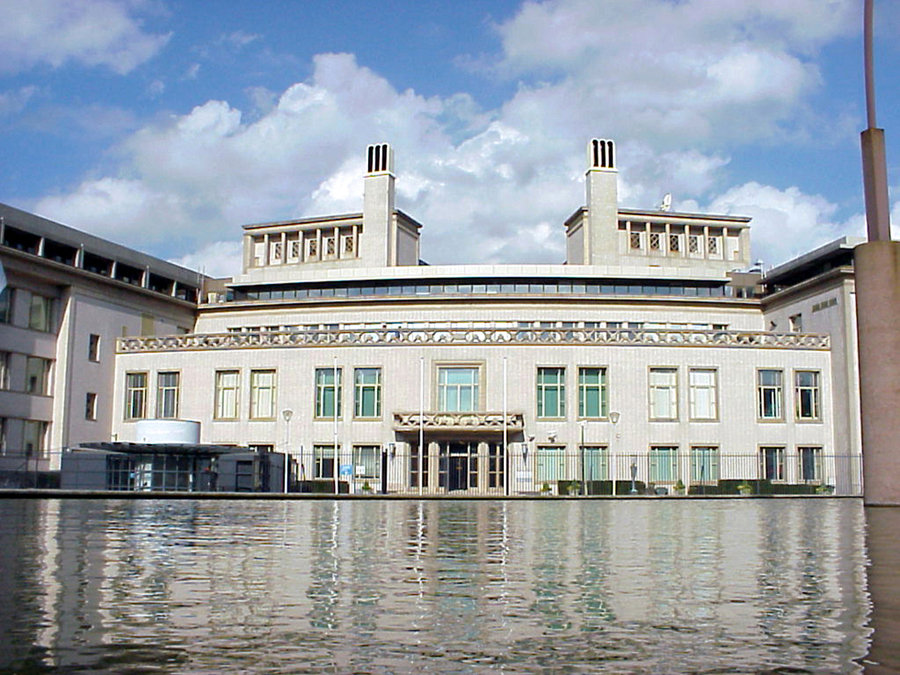
- Front of the ICTY building
- Date: 8 April 1997
- Meeting no.: 3,763
- Code: S/RES/1104 (Document)
- Subject: Tribunal (Former Yugoslavia)
- Voting summary: 15 voted for; None voted against; None abstained
- Result: Adopted

Security Council composition
- Permanent members: China; France; Russia; United Kingdom; United States
- Non-permanent members: Chile; Costa Rica; Egypt; Guinea-Bissau; Japan; Kenya; South Korea; Poland; Portugal; Sweden

United Nations Security Council resolution 1104, adopted unanimously on 8 April 1997, after recalling 808 (1993) and 827 (1993) and considering the nominations for Judges of the International Criminal Tribunal for the former Yugoslavia received by the Secretary-General Kofi Annan by 13 March 1997, the council established a list of candidates in accordance with Article 13 of the Statute of the International Tribunal to be forwarded to the General Assembly.

The list of nominations was as follows:

- Masoud Mohamed Al-Amri (Qatar)
- George Randolph Tissa Dias Bandaranayake (Sri Lanka)
- Antonio Cassese (Italy)
- Babiker Zain Elabideen Elbashir (Sudan)
- Saad Saood Jan (Pakistan)
- Claude Jorda (France)
- Adolphus Godwin Karibi-Whyte (Nigeria)
- Richard George May (United Kingdom)
- Gabrielle Kirk McDonald (United States)
- Florence Ndepele Mwachande Mumba (Zambia)
- Rafael Nieto Navia (Colombia)
- Daniel Nsereko (Uganda)
- Elizabeth Odio Benito (Costa Rica)
- Fouad Abdel-Moneim Riad (Egypt)
- Almiro Simtes Rodrigues (Portugal)
- Mohamed Shahabuddeen (Guyana)
- Jan Skupinski (Poland)
- Wang Tieya (China)
- Lal Chand Vohrah (Malaysia)

11 of the 19 nominations would be elected to the Court.

== See also ==
- Bosnian War
- Breakup of Yugoslavia
- Croatian War of Independence
- List of United Nations Security Council Resolutions 1101 to 1200 (1997–1998)
- Yugoslav Wars
- List of United Nations Security Council Resolutions related to the conflicts in former Yugoslavia
