= United Nations Security Council Resolution 1196 =

United Nations Security Council resolution

UN Security Council Resolution 1196
- Africa
- Date: 16 September 1998
- Meeting no.: 3,927
- Code: S/RES/1196 (Document)
- Subject: The situation in Africa
- Voting summary: 15 voted for; None voted against; None abstained
- Result: Adopted

Security Council composition
- Permanent members: China; France; Russia; United Kingdom; United States
- Non-permanent members: Bahrain; Brazil; Costa Rica; Gabon; Gambia; Japan; Kenya; Portugal; Slovenia; Sweden

The United Nations Security Council resolution 1196 was adopted unanimously on 16 September 1998, after recalling Resolution 1170 (1998) on Africa; the Council discussed the importance of strengthening the effectiveness of arms embargoes in place in several countries across the continent.

The Security Council considered the recommendations in a report by the Secretary-General Kofi Annan on "The causes of conflict and the promotion of durable peace and sustainable development in Africa" regarding the strengthening of arms embargoes and the unavailability of weapons. It was mindful of the 1993 Cairo Declaration which stipulated that the Organisation of African Unity (OAU) would anticipate and prevent conflicts as a primary objective and reaffirmed the responsibility of all states to settle their differences peacefully.

The resolution reiterated that the obligations of all states to implement security council decisions relating to arms embargoes and were encouraged to make violations of the embargoes a criminal offence. It encouraged the improved monitoring of arms embargoes through regional exchanges of information, such as through the OAU, Economic Community of West African States (ECOWAS), Southern African Development Community (SADC) and the Intergovernmental Authority on Development (IGAD). All states were to report on violations of the arms embargoes.

The council expressed its willingness to consider all appropriate measures to enforce the arms embargoes by way of border controls or investigations into arms trafficking. The resolution concluded by stressing that arms embargoes imposed by the council had clear objectives and provisions for reviewing them once the objectives were met.

== See also ==
- List of conflicts in Africa
- List of United Nations Security Council Resolutions 1101 to 1200 (1997–1998)
