= United Nations Security Council Resolution 1117 =

United Nations Security Council resolution

UN Security Council Resolution 1117
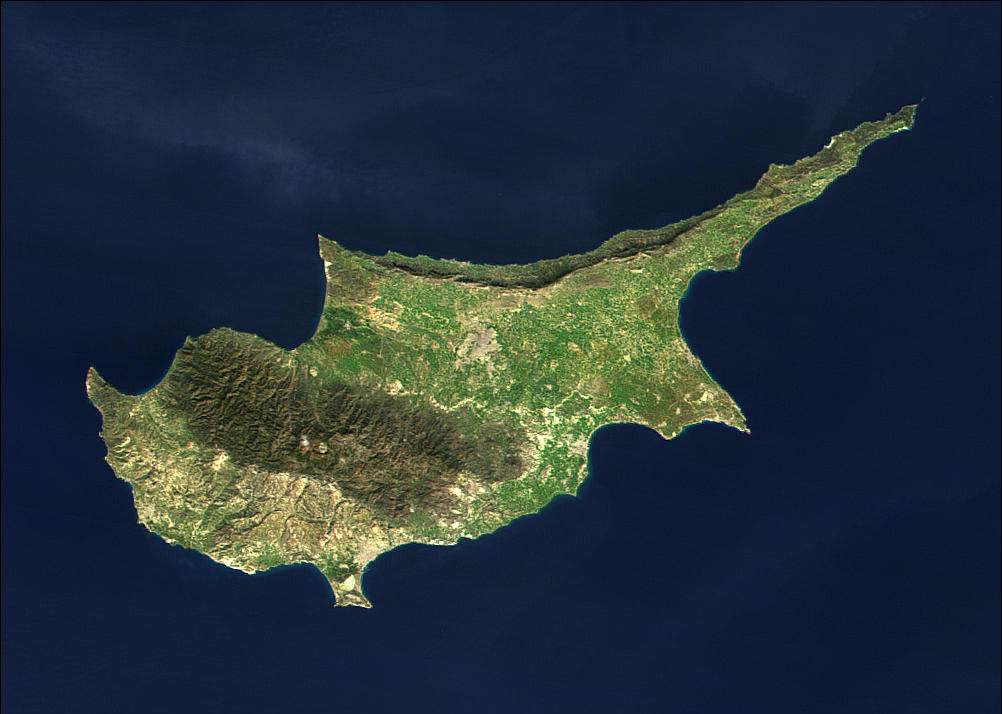
- Satellite view of Cyprus
- Date: 27 June 1997
- Meeting no.: 3,794
- Code: S/RES/1117 (Document)
- Subject: The situation in Cyprus
- Voting summary: 15 voted for; None voted against; None abstained
- Result: Adopted

Security Council composition
- Permanent members: China; France; Russia; United Kingdom; United States
- Non-permanent members: Chile; Costa Rica; Egypt; Guinea-Bissau; Japan; Kenya; South Korea; Poland; Portugal; Sweden

United Nations Security Council resolution 1117, adopted unanimously on 27 June 1997, after recalling all resolutions on Cyprus, particularly resolutions 186 (1964), 939 (1994) and 1092 (1996), the Council extended the mandate of the United Nations Peacekeeping Force in Cyprus (UNFICYP) until 31 December 1997.

Cyprus agreed to a further extension of the UNFICYP peacekeeping force. Meanwhile, the Council recognised that tensions remained high near the buffer zone, although the number of serious incidents had decreased. Negotiations at a political resolution to the dispute were at an impasse for too long.

The two parties to the conflict, the Republic of Cyprus and Northern Cyprus, were reminded of their obligation to prevent violence against the peacekeepers. The resolution regretted that measures proposed by UNFICYP to reduce tension, as outlined in Resolution 1092, had not been accepted by either side. There was also concern about the strengthening of military weapons in southern Cyprus and the lack of progress in decreasing the number of foreign troops. In this regard, the Council urged the Republic of Cyprus to cut back on defence spending and withdraw foreign troops, with an overall view to demilitarising the entire island. Accession talks with the European Union would also help facilitate an overall settlement.

In Paragraph 13, the resolution "welcomes the efforts of the United Nations and others concerned to promote the holding of bi-communal events so as to build trust and mutual respect between the two communities, urges that these efforts be continued, acknowledges the recent cooperation from all concerned on both sides to that end, and strongly encourages them to take further steps to facilitate such bi-communal events and to ensure that they take place in conditions of safety and security".

The resolution concluded by reiterating that the status quo was unacceptable and for negotiations to take place to find a solution, and directing the Secretary-General Kofi Annan to report back to the council by 10 December 1997 on the implementation of the current resolution.

== See also ==
- Cyprus dispute
- List of United Nations Security Council Resolutions 1101 to 1200 (1997–1998)
- United Nations Buffer Zone in Cyprus
- Turkish Invasion of Cyprus
