= United Nations Security Council Resolution 1156 =

UN Security Council Resolution 1156
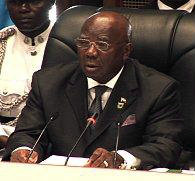
- Former President of Sierra Leone Ahmad Tejan Kabbah, who was returned to power in 1998
- Date: 16 March 1998
- Meeting no.: 3,861
- Code: S/RES/1156 (Document)
- Subject: The situation in Sierra Leone
- Voting summary: 15 voted for; None voted against; None abstained
- Result: Adopted

Security Council composition
- Permanent members: China; France; Russia; United Kingdom; United States
- Non-permanent members: Bahrain; Brazil; Costa Rica; Gabon; Gambia; Japan; Kenya; Portugal; Slovenia; Sweden

United Nations Security Council resolution 1156 was adopted unanimously on 16 March 1998, after recalling Resolution 1132 (1997) on the situation in Sierra Leone and noting the return of the democratically elected President Ahmad Tejan Kabbah; the council, acting under Chapter VII of the United Nations Charter, terminated petroleum sanctions on the country, though an arms embargo remained in effect.

The security council welcomed the intention of Secretary-General Kofi Annan to make recommendations concerning the future role of the United Nations and its presence in Sierra Leone. The arms embargo would be reviewed in the light of new developments and discussions with the government of Sierra Leone.

== See also ==
- History of Sierra Leone
- List of United Nations Security Council Resolutions 1101 to 1200 (1997–1998)
- Sierra Leone Civil War
