= United Nations Security Council Resolution 1131 =

UN Security Council Resolution 1131
- Date: 29 September 1997
- Meeting no.: 3,821
- Code: S/RES/1131 (Document)
- Subject: The situation concerning Western Sahara
- Voting summary: 15 voted for; None voted against; None abstained
- Result: Adopted

Security Council composition
- Permanent members: China; France; Russia; United Kingdom; United States
- Non-permanent members: Chile; Costa Rica; Egypt; Guinea-Bissau; Japan; Kenya; South Korea; Poland; Portugal; Sweden

United Nations Security Council resolution 1131, adopted unanimously on 29 September 1997, after recalling all previous resolutions on the Western Sahara, the Council extended the mandate of the United Nations Mission for the Referendum in Western Sahara (MINURSO) until 20 October 1997.

The resolution expressed satisfaction that both Morocco and the Polisario Front had co-operated with the Secretary-General's Personal Envoy and reiterated its commitment to the holding of a free, fair and impartial referendum for the self-determination for the people of Western Sahara.

MINURSO's mandate was extended to prepare for the resumption of the process of identifying prospective voters and to enable concerned members of the council to engage in consultations with their authorities on the proposed expansion of the operation. The council also endorsed Kofi Annan's recommendation that MINURSO be extended until 20 April 1998 to continue with the identification process.

== See also ==
- History of Western Sahara
- List of United Nations Security Council Resolutions 1101 to 1200 (1997–1998)
- Sahrawi Arab Democratic Republic
- Wall (Western Sahara)
