= United Nations Security Council Resolution 1179 =

UN Security Council Resolution 1179
- Divided Cyprus with Northern Cyprus highlighted
- Date: 29 June 1998
- Meeting no.: 3,898
- Code: S/RES/1179 (Document)
- Subject: The situation in Cyprus
- Voting summary: 15 voted for; None voted against; None abstained
- Result: Adopted

Security Council composition
- Permanent members: China; France; Russia; United Kingdom; United States
- Non-permanent members: Bahrain; Brazil; Costa Rica; Gabon; Gambia; Japan; Kenya; Portugal; Slovenia; Sweden

United Nations Security Council resolution 1179, adopted unanimously on 29 June 1998, after reaffirming all past resolutions on the situation in Cyprus, the Council discussed attempts to resolve the long-standing political dispute.

The Security Council called on all states to respect the sovereignty and territorial integrity of the Republic of Cyprus and to refrain from actions that would prejudice this, divide the island or seek union with another country. It also expressed concern at negotiations between Cyprus and Northern Cyprus had yet to make any substantial progress despite United Nations support.

The resolution reaffirmed the position that the status quo was unacceptable and that the situation must be settled on the basis of a single state of Cyprus with two politically equal communities in a bi-communal and bi-zonal union without secession or union with another country. It welcomed the Secretary-General Kofi Annan's intention to explore new possibilities that would lead to new momentum in the negotiation process. The Turkish Cypriot side in particular was called upon to commit itself to this process, while both parties were urged to co-operate with the Secretary-General in order to resume dialogue.

Finally, Kofi Annan was instructed to report on the situation on the island by 10 December 1998.

== See also ==
- Cyprus dispute
- List of United Nations Security Council Resolutions 1101 to 1200 (1997–1998)
- United Nations Buffer Zone in Cyprus
- United Nations Peacekeeping Force in Cyprus
- Turkish invasion of Cyprus
