= United Nations Security Council Resolution 1110 =

UN Security Council Resolution 1110
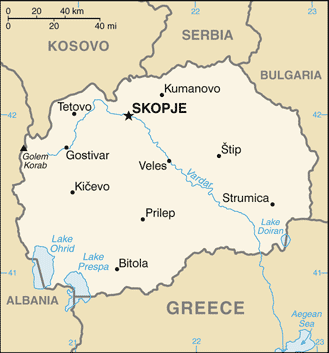
- Macedonia
- Date: 28 May 1997
- Meeting no.: 3,783
- Code: S/RES/1110 (Document)
- Subject: The situation in the former Yugoslav Republic of Macedonia
- Voting summary: 15 voted for; None voted against; None abstained
- Result: Adopted

Security Council composition
- Permanent members: China; France; Russia; United Kingdom; United States
- Non-permanent members: Chile; Costa Rica; Egypt; Guinea-Bissau; Japan; Kenya; South Korea; Poland; Portugal; Sweden

United Nations Security Council resolution 1110, adopted unanimously on 28 May 1997, after recalling resolutions 1082 (1996) and 1105 (1997), the Council renewed the mandate of the United Nations Preventive Deployment Force (UNPREDEP) in Macedonia until 30 November 1997.

The UNPREDEP peacekeeping mission played an important role in promoting peace and stability in Macedonia. It also recalled Resolution 1101 (1997) over the rebellion in neighbouring Albania. Meanwhile, Macedonia's relations with Serbia and Montenegro had advanced significantly, and they had signed an agreement on the demarcation of their common border. Macedonia had requested that UNPREDEP's mandate be extended, and it was noted that stability in the region remained fragile, given developments in Albania.

The Security Council extended UNPREDEP's mandate until 30 November 1997 and authorised a reduction of the military component, beginning from 1 October 1997, of 300 personnel. The Secretary-General Kofi Annan was requested to keep the Council informed on developments, reporting on the composition, deployment, strength and mandate of UNPREDEP, noting the parliamentary elections and situation in Albania by 15 August 1997. In this regard, the redeployment of UNPREDEP was welcomed.

== See also ==
- Breakup of Yugoslavia
- List of United Nations Security Council Resolutions 1101 to 1200 (1997–1998)
- Macedonia naming dispute
- Yugoslav Wars
- List of United Nations Security Council Resolutions related to the conflicts in former Yugoslavia
