= United Nations Security Council Resolution 1170 =

UN Security Council Resolution 1170
- Africa
- Date: 28 May 1998
- Meeting no.: 3,886
- Code: S/RES/1170 (Document)
- Subject: The situation in Africa
- Voting summary: 15 voted for; None voted against; None abstained
- Result: Adopted

Security Council composition
- Permanent members: China; France; Russia; United Kingdom; United States
- Non-permanent members: Bahrain; Brazil; Costa Rica; Gabon; Gambia; Japan; Kenya; Portugal; Slovenia; Sweden

United Nations Security Council resolution 1170, adopted unanimously on 27 May 1998, after considering the situation across the African continent, the Council decided to establish an ad hoc Working Group to review the Secretary-General Kofi Annan's recommendations concerning the maintenance of international peace and security in Africa.

== Observations ==
In the preamble of Resolution 1170, the security council supported the engagement of the United Nations in Africa through diplomatic, economic, humanitarian, peacekeeping and other activities, and reaffirmed the obligation of all member states to settle disputes in a peaceful manner. It was mindful of the 1993 Cairo Declaration which stipulated that the Organisation of African Unity (OAU) would anticipate and prevent conflicts as a primary objective and the African Nuclear Weapons Free Zone Treaty which was an important contribution to regional peace and security.

The council was concerned at the continuation of armed conflicts in Africa which had led to mass displacement, poverty, instability and suffering. There were destabilising effects of illegal arms transfers, armed militias and the use of mercenaries across the continent. It was noted that African countries had made progress towards economic reform and democratisation with respect for human rights. The Office for the Coordination of Humanitarian Affairs and the United Nations High Commissioner for Refugees were ready to assist in humanitarian and refugee crises in accordance with international law and international humanitarian law.

== Acts ==
The security council welcomed the report of the secretary-general on the situation in Africa, which detailed the sources of conflict on the continent and ways to address it. Kofi Annan had made recommendations concerning arms trafficking, sanctions, refugees, structural adjustment, development assistance and debt and trade. He also emphasised the responsibility of African leaders in regional conflicts and economic failures, and the dangers of foreign intervention. The resolution stressed that challenges in Africa demanded a comprehensive response and that all United Nations agencies, international organisations and all countries would consider the recommendations in the report.

A working group consisting of all members of the council was then established for a period of six months to review the recommendations in the report and consider ways of implementing them and submit proposals for consideration in September 1998 when a ministerial level meeting would be convened. The council stressed the need for close co-operation between it and the OAU and commended the efforts of the OAU in conflict prevention. At the same time, contributions from member states, regional organisations and United Nations agencies towards peacekeeping operations in Africa were welcomed.

== See also ==
- Human rights in Africa
- List of conflicts in Africa
- List of United Nations Security Council Resolutions 1101 to 1200 (1997–1998)
