= United Nations Security Council Resolution 1114 =

UN Security Council Resolution 1114
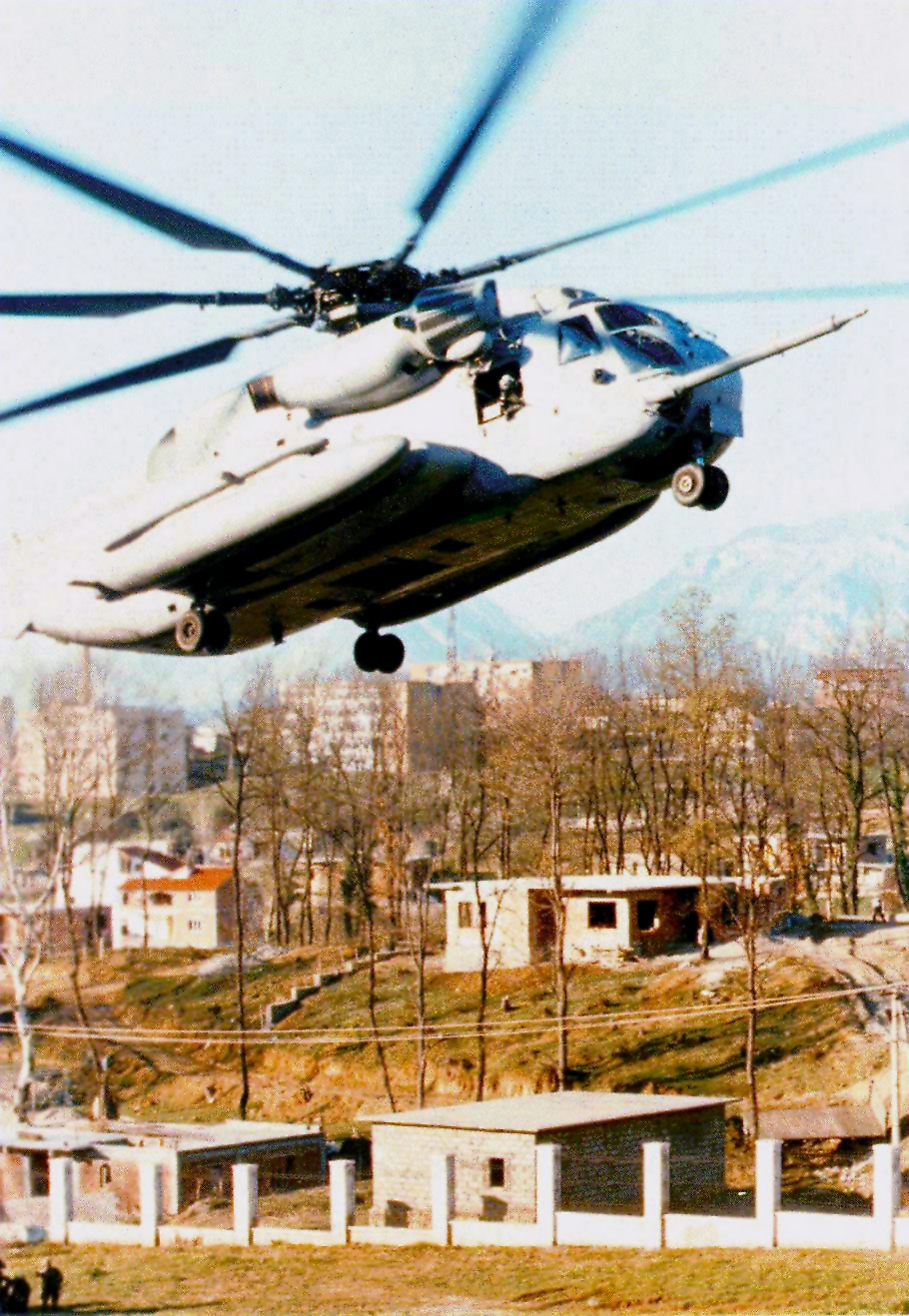
- Evacuations in the Albanian capital Tirana
- Date: 19 June 1997
- Meeting no.: 3,791
- Code: S/RES/1114 (Document)
- Subject: The situation in Albania
- Voting summary: 14 voted for; None voted against; 1 abstained
- Result: Adopted

Security Council composition
- Permanent members: China; France; Russia; United Kingdom; United States
- Non-permanent members: Chile; Costa Rica; Egypt; Guinea-Bissau; Japan; Kenya; South Korea; Poland; Portugal; Sweden

United Nations Security Council resolution 1114, adopted on 19 June 1997, after recalling Resolution 1101 (1997) on the situation in Albania, the Council authorised an extension to the multinational force in the country for a further 45 days, beginning on 28 June 1997.

The council appreciated the impartial way in which the council's mandate had been carried out by the multinational protection force in Albania and for its collaboration with the Albanian authorities. The force was authorised in the wake of the rebellion in the country caused by the failure of the Ponzi scheme. It was noted that violence was still continuing, and given that parliamentary elections were due to take place, a limited extension was necessary.

All violence in the country was condemned and was urged to cease immediately. The countries contributing to the protection force were asked to bear the cost of the operation and, acting under Chapter VII of the United Nations Charter, were authorised to secure the safety and freedom of movement of the multinational force and monitors from the Organization for Security and Co-operation in Europe (OSCE). The provision of humanitarian assistance was stressed through co-operation with the Government of Albania, the OSCE, European Union, United Nations and international organisations. Finally, the participating states were required to submit regular reports on their operations to the council.

The resolution was adopted by 14 votes to none against, with one abstention from China, which was against what it called "interference in the internal affairs of Albania", and had opposed the earlier intervention authorised in Resolution 1101. Given Albanian's request for assistance however, it did not veto the resolution.

== See also ==
- 1997 rebellion in Albania
- List of United Nations Security Council Resolutions 1101 to 1200 (1997–1998)
- Operation Libelle
- Operation Silver Wake
