= United Nations Security Council Resolution 1105 =

UN Security Council Resolution 1105
- UNPREDEP medal bar
- Date: 9 April 1997
- Meeting no.: 3,764
- Code: S/RES/1105 (Document)
- Subject: The situation in the former Yugoslav Republic of Macedonia
- Voting summary: 15 voted for; None voted against; None abstained
- Result: Adopted

Security Council composition
- Permanent members: China; France; Russia; United Kingdom; United States
- Non-permanent members: Chile; Costa Rica; Egypt; Guinea-Bissau; Japan; Kenya; South Korea; Poland; Portugal; Sweden

United Nations Security Council resolution 1105, adopted unanimously on 9 April 1997, after recalling Resolution 1082 (1996), the Council decided to suspend reduction of the military component of the United Nations Preventive Deployment Force (UNPREDEP) in Macedonia until the end of its current mandate, until 31 May 1997.

The security council reaffirmed its commitment to the sovereignty and territorial integrity of Macedonia. It welcomed the redeployment of UNPREDEP given the ongoing rebellion in Albania, urging the Secretary-General Kofi Annan to consider further redeployments if necessary. He was requested to report to the council by 15 May 1997 with recommendations on a subsequent international presence in Macedonia as mentioned in Resolution 1082.

== See also ==
- Breakup of Yugoslavia
- List of United Nations Security Council Resolutions 1101 to 1200 (1997–1998)
- Macedonia naming dispute
- Yugoslav Wars
- List of United Nations Security Council Resolutions related to the conflicts in former Yugoslavia
