= United Nations Security Council Resolution 1298 =

UN Security Council Resolution 1298
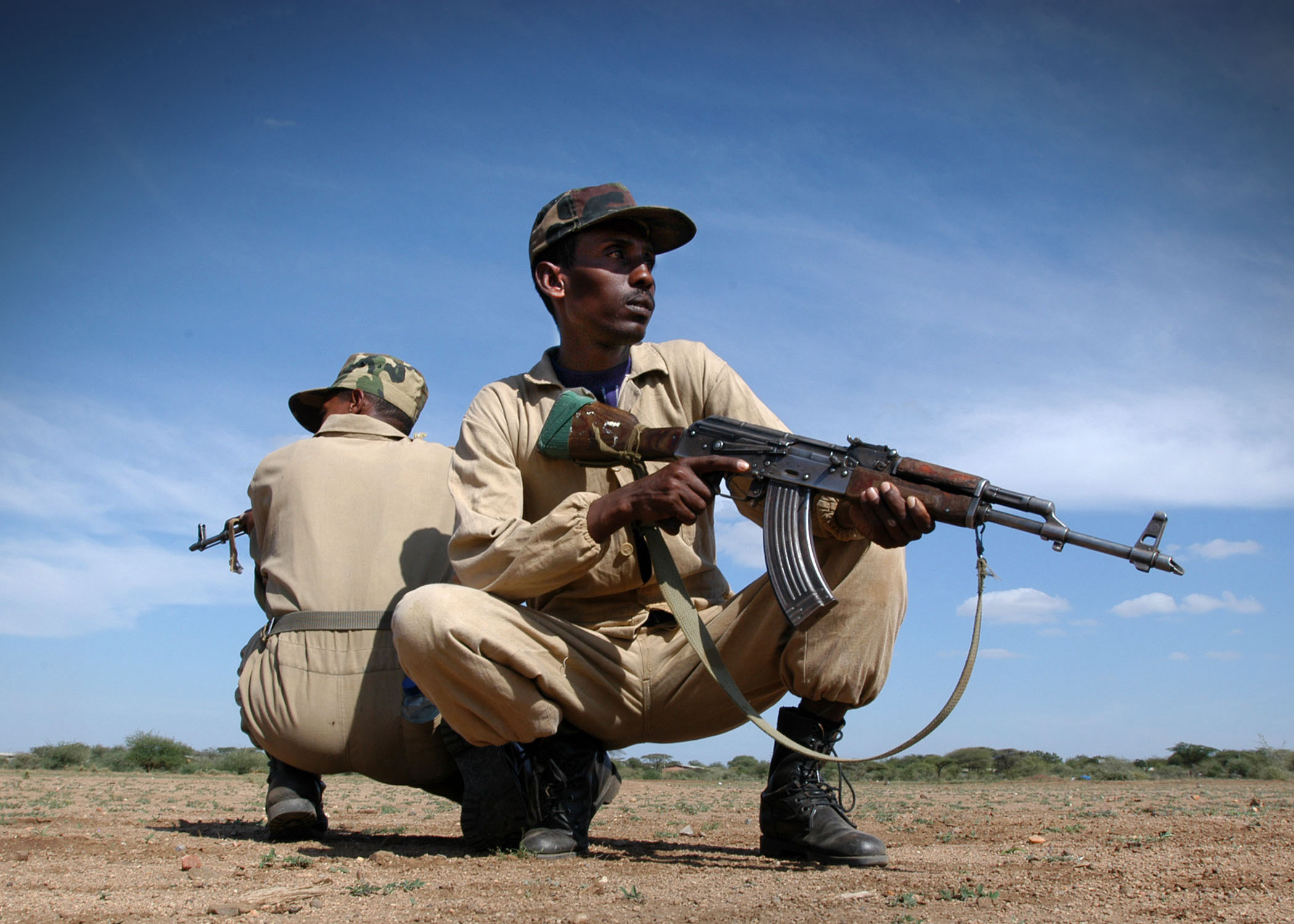
- Ethiopian soldiers
- Date: 17 May 2000
- Meeting no.: 4,144
- Code: S/RES/1298 (Document)
- Subject: The situation between Eritrea and Ethiopia
- Voting summary: 15 voted for; None voted against; None abstained
- Result: Adopted

Security Council composition
- Permanent members: China; France; Russia; United Kingdom; United States
- Non-permanent members: Argentina; Bangladesh; Canada; Jamaica; Malaysia; Mali; Namibia; Netherlands; Tunisia; Ukraine

United Nations Security Council resolution 1298 is a United Nation Security Council resolution that was adopted unanimously on 17 May 2000. After reaffirming resolutions 1177 (1998), 1226 (1999), 1227 (1999) and 1297 (2000) on the situation between Eritrea and Ethiopia, the Council condemned continuing hostilities and imposed an arms embargo on both countries.

The Security Council recalled a request upon member states to end arms sales to Ethiopia and Eritrea in Resolution 1227. It deplored the ongoing fighting between the two countries and expressed regret that all resources in those countries were being diverted towards the conflict which had a negative effect on efforts to address the ongoing food crisis. There was need for a peaceful solution and initial discussions under the auspices of the Organisation of African Unity (OAU) had just ended. At the same time the council determined the situation to be a threat to peace and security in the region.

Acting under Chapter VII of the United Nations Charter, the fighting between Ethiopia and Eritrea was strongly condemned and the security council demanded that both parties retreated and resumed talks as soon as possible. All countries were prevented from selling arms, ammunition and all related technical assistance or training to Eritrea and Ethiopia. Only non-lethal military equipment for humanitarian use was excluded from the arms embargo. A committee of the security council was established to monitor compliance with the embargo, enhance its effectiveness, investigate violations and determine cases to be excluded from its provisions. All countries had to report within 30 days regarding what steps they had taken to implement the measures, which would apply for a period of 12 months.

Finally, the Secretary-General Kofi Annan was requested to report within 15 days and every 60 days thereafter on the implementation of the current resolution. The Council declared that the embargo would be terminated if a peaceful settlement of the conflict had been concluded.

The effectiveness of the arms embargo was questioned by diplomats who recalled that both countries had enough stockpiles of weapons and ammunition to last the year.

== See also ==
- Eritrean–Ethiopian War
- List of United Nations Security Council Resolutions 1201 to 1300 (1998–2000)
- United Nations Mission in Ethiopia and Eritrea
