= United Nations Security Council Resolution 1297 =

UN Security Council Resolution 1297
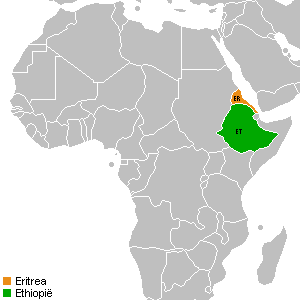
- Eritrea (orange) and Ethiopia (green)
- Date: 12 May 2000
- Meeting no.: 4,142
- Code: S/RES/1297 (Document)
- Subject: The situation between Eritrea and Ethiopia
- Voting summary: 15 voted for; None voted against; None abstained
- Result: Adopted

Security Council composition
- Permanent members: China; France; Russia; United Kingdom; United States
- Non-permanent members: Argentina; Bangladesh; Canada; Jamaica; Malaysia; Mali; Namibia; Netherlands; Tunisia; Ukraine

United Nations Security Council resolution 1297 was adopted unanimously on 12 May 2000, after reaffirming resolutions 1177 (1998), 1226 (1999) and 1227 (1999) on the situation between Eritrea and Ethiopia. The Council demanded an immediate end to hostilities between the two countries.

In the preamble of the resolution, the Council expressed distress at the outbreak of renewed fighting between Eritrea and Ethiopia on 12 May 2000 and the humanitarian consequences on the civilian population. It stressed the need for efforts to achieve a peaceful resolution to the conflict under the auspices of the Organisation of African Unity (OAU). The hostilities constituted a threat not only to peace and security between the two countries but also to the stability, security and economic development in the subregion.

The resolution condemned the resumption of hostilities and called for both parties to cease all military action. It demanded the reconvening of talks under OAU auspices and endorsed its Framework Agreement and achievements. Both countries were urged to respect human rights and international humanitarian law and ensure the safety of the civilian population.

The Security Council decided to reconvene within 72 hours to discuss measures to ensure compliance with the current resolution if the fighting continued. Meanwhile, the Secretary-General Kofi Annan was requested to keep the Council informed on the situation.

Within several days, Resolution 1298 was adopted, which imposed an arms embargo on both countries.

== See also ==
- Eritrean–Ethiopian War
- List of United Nations Security Council Resolutions 1201 to 1300 (1998–2000)
- United Nations Mission in Ethiopia and Eritrea
