= United Nations Security Council Resolution 1282 =

United Nations Security Council resolution

UN Security Council Resolution 1282
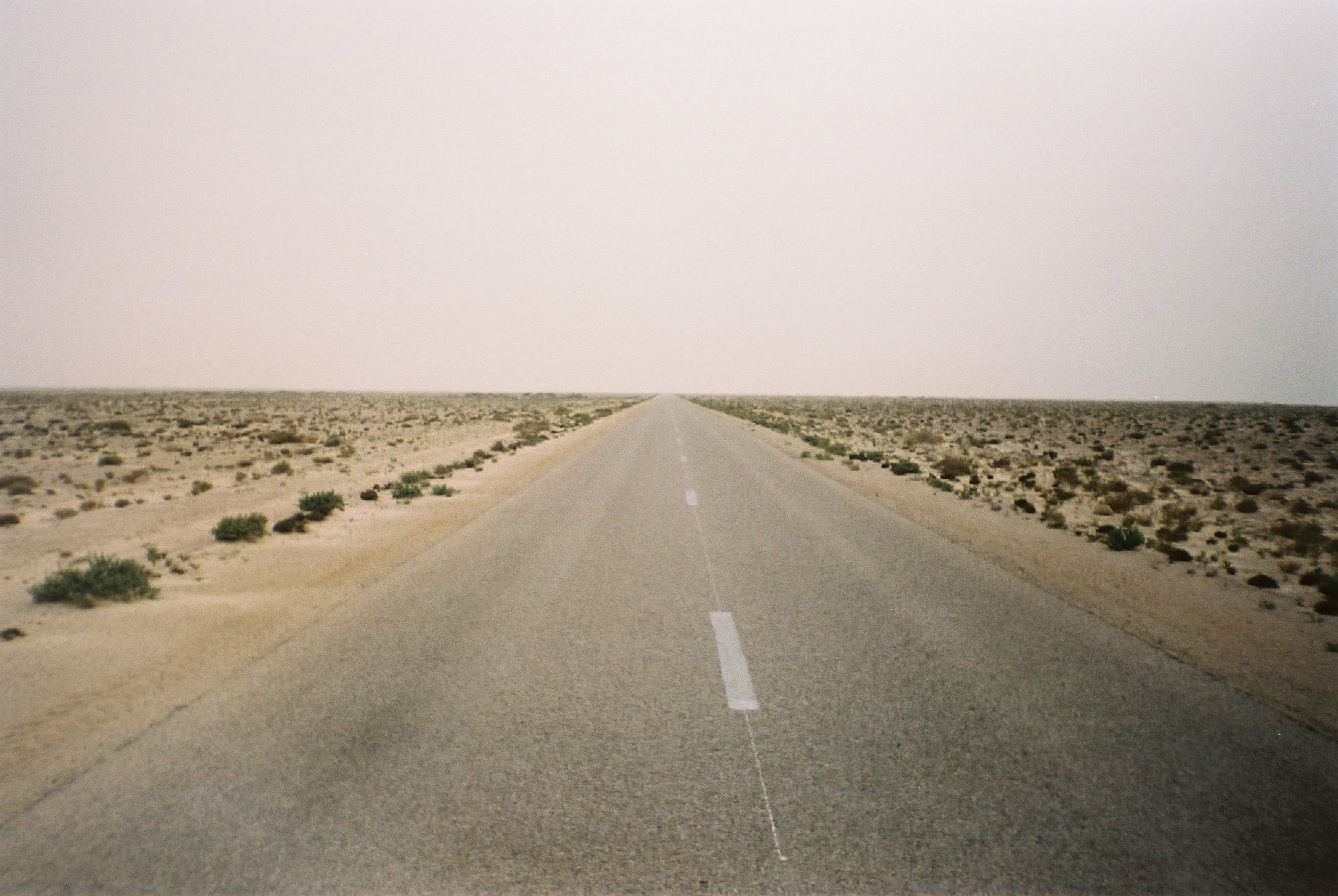
- Road in Western Sahara
- Date: 14 December 1999
- Meeting no.: 4,080
- Code: S/RES/1282 (Document)
- Subject: The situation concerning Western Sahara
- Voting summary: 14 voted for; None voted against; 1 abstained
- Result: Adopted

Security Council composition
- Permanent members: China; France; Russia; United Kingdom; United States
- Non-permanent members: Argentina; Bahrain; Brazil; Canada; Gabon; Gambia; Malaysia; Namibia; Netherlands; Slovenia

United Nations Security Council resolution 1282, adopted on 14 December 1999, after reaffirming all previous resolutions on the question of the Western Sahara, in particular resolutions 1238 (1999) and 1263 (1999), the council extended the mandate of the United Nations Mission for the Referendum in Western Sahara (MINURSO) until 29 February 2000 in order to complete the identification of voters.

The security council also extended MINURSO's mandate to issue a second provisional voters list and initiate appeals for some tribal groupings. Morocco and the Polisario Front had agreed to draw up a plan on cross-border confidence-building measures and person-to-person contacts, and both were called upon to co-operate with MINURSO and the United Nations High Commissioner for Refugees to implement the measures.

Many candidates had exercised their right of appeal and there was opposition to the issue of admissibility which meant that the referendum on self-determination for the people of Western Sahara could not take place before 2002 or beyond. The Secretary-General Kofi Annan was to help the parties reconcile, though the council noted that there would be difficulties in this process. In this regard the secretary-general was requested to report to the council before the end of MINURSO's current mandate on the prospects of implementing the Settlement Plan within a reasonable period of time.

Resolution 1282 was adopted by 14 votes to none against and one abstention from Namibia; the country had felt that the resolution ignored previous concerns of the council and had portrayed a negative picture to the international community.

== See also ==
- Free Zone (region)
- History of Western Sahara
- Legal status of Western Sahara
- List of United Nations Security Council Resolutions 1201 to 1300 (1998–2000)
- Sahrawi Arab Democratic Republic
- Wall (Western Sahara)
