= United Nations Security Council Resolution 1228 =

UN Security Council Resolution 1228
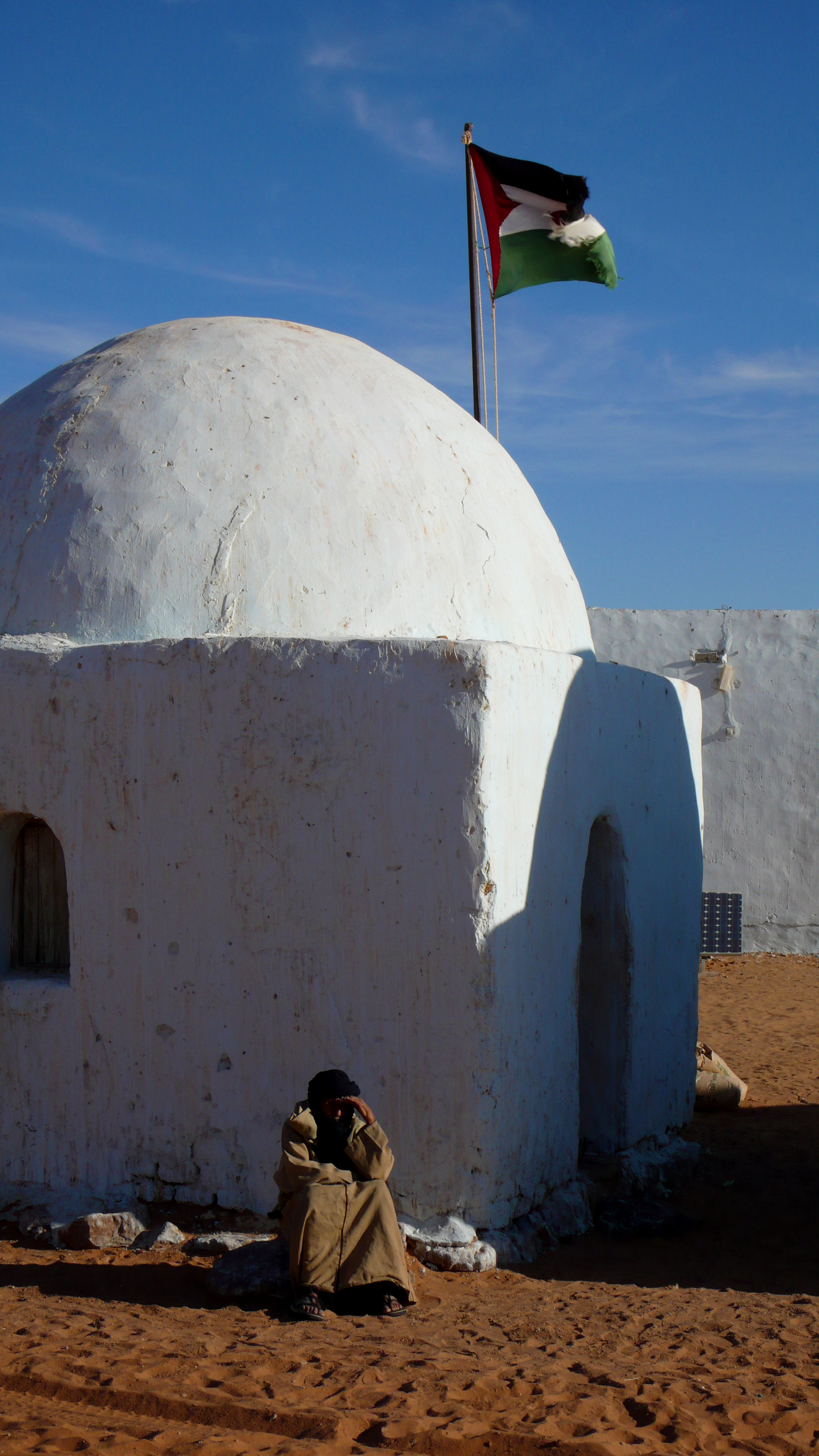
- Refugee camp of Dakhla in Tindouf, Algeria
- Date: 11 February 1999
- Meeting no.: 3,976
- Code: S/RES/1228 (Document)
- Subject: The situation concerning Western Sahara
- Voting summary: 15 voted for; None voted against; None abstained
- Result: Adopted

Security Council composition
- Permanent members: China; France; Russia; United Kingdom; United States
- Non-permanent members: Argentina; Bahrain; Brazil; Canada; Gabon; Gambia; Malaysia; Namibia; Netherlands; Slovenia

United Nations Security Council resolution 1228, adopted unanimously on 11 February 1999, after reaffirming all previous resolutions on the question of the Western Sahara, particularly resolutions 1204 (1998) and 1215 (1998), the Council extended the mandate of the United Nations Mission for the Referendum in Western Sahara (MINURSO) until 31 March 1999 to allow time for consultations on issues relating to a proposed referendum.

The resolution extended MINURSO's mandate so that consultations could take place to achieve an agreement on protocols relating to the identification of voters and return of refugees. Both the Moroccan government and the Polisario Front were urged to enable the United Nations High Commissioner for Refugees to carry out work for the repatriation of refugees and their families eligible to vote according to the Settlement Plan.

The security council supported the intention of the Secretary-General Kofi Annan to ask his Personal Envoy to reassess the viability of the mandate of MINURSO if there was difficulty implementing the measures and requested him to report back to the council by 22 March 1999.

== See also ==
- Free Zone (region)
- History of Western Sahara
- List of United Nations Security Council Resolutions 1201 to 1300 (1998–2000)
- Sahrawi Arab Democratic Republic
- Wall (Western Sahara)
