= United Nations Security Council Resolution 1283 =

UN Security Council Resolution 1283
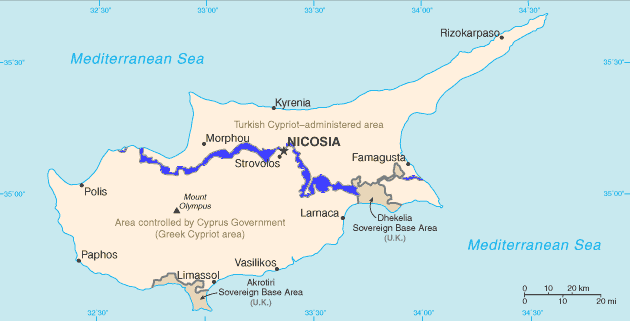
- Divided Cyprus with buffer zone
- Date: 15 December 1999
- Meeting no.: 4,082
- Code: S/RES/1283 (Document)
- Subject: The situation in Cyprus
- Voting summary: 15 voted for; None voted against; None abstained
- Result: Adopted

Security Council composition
- Permanent members: China; France; Russia; United Kingdom; United States
- Non-permanent members: Argentina; Bahrain; Brazil; Canada; Gabon; Gambia; Malaysia; Namibia; Netherlands; Slovenia

United Nations Security Council resolution 1283, adopted unanimously on 15 December 1999, after reaffirming all resolutions on the situation in Cyprus, including Resolution 1251 (1999), the Council extended the mandate of the United Nations Peacekeeping Force in Cyprus (UNFICYP) for a further six months until 15 June 2000.

The Security Council called upon Cyprus and Northern Cyprus to address the humanitarian issue relating to missing persons urgently. The Secretary-General Kofi Annan was requested to report by 1 June 2000 on the implementation of this resolution.

== See also ==
- Cyprus dispute
- List of United Nations Security Council Resolutions 1201 to 1300 (1998–2000)
- United Nations Buffer Zone in Cyprus
- Turkish invasion of Cyprus
