= United Nations Security Council Resolution 1294 =

UN Security Council Resolution 1294
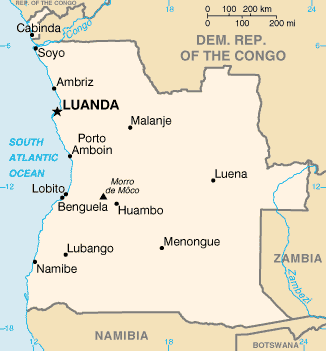
- Angola
- Date: 13 April 2000
- Meeting no.: 4,126
- Code: S/RES/1294 (Document)
- Subject: The situation in Angola
- Voting summary: 15 voted for; None voted against; None abstained
- Result: Adopted

Security Council composition
- Permanent members: China; France; Russia; United Kingdom; United States
- Non-permanent members: Argentina; Bangladesh; Canada; Jamaica; Malaysia; Mali; Namibia; Netherlands; Tunisia; Ukraine

United Nations Security Council resolution 1294, adopted unanimously on 13 April 2000, after reaffirming Resolution 696 (1991) and all subsequent resolutions on Angola, particularly Resolution 1268 (1999), the Council extended the mandate of the United Nations Office in Angola (UNOA) until 15 October 2000.

The Council reaffirmed that the presence of the United Nations in Angola would contribute towards the promotion of national reconciliation, human rights, peace and security. It endorsed the decision of the Secretary-General Kofi Annan to extend UNOA's mandate, requested him to continue efforts to implement its mandate and to report every three months on measures the Security Council could take to promote peace in Angola.

== See also ==
- Angolan Civil War
- List of United Nations Security Council Resolutions 1201 to 1300 (1998–2000)
