= United Nations Security Council Resolution 1758 =

UN Security Council Resolution 1758
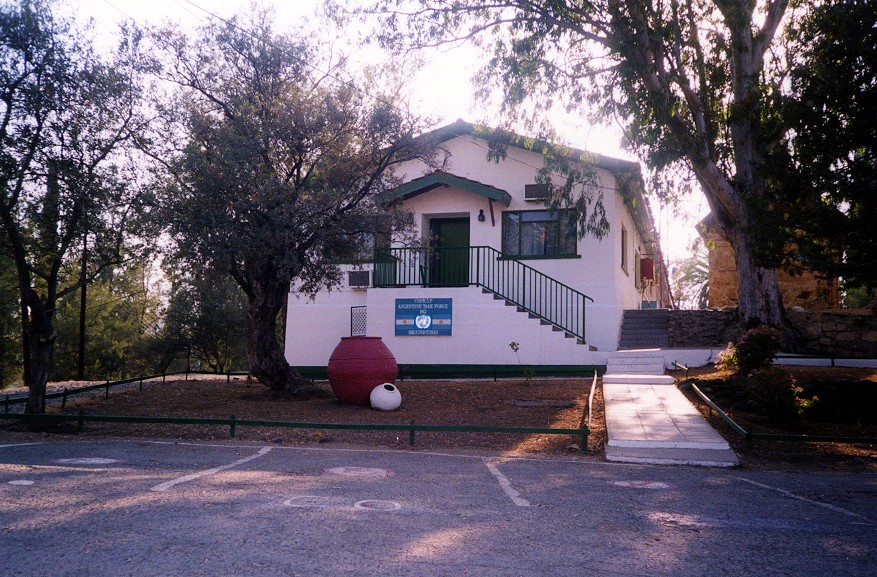
- UNFICYP camp
- Date: 15 June 2007
- Meeting no.: 5,696
- Code: S/RES/1758 (Document)
- Subject: The situation in Cyprus
- Voting summary: 15 voted for; None voted against; None abstained
- Result: Adopted

Security Council composition
- Permanent members: China; France; Russia; United Kingdom; United States
- Non-permanent members: Belgium; Rep. of the Congo; Ghana; Indonesia; Italy; Panama; Peru; Qatar; Slovakia; South Africa

United Nations Security Council Resolution 1758, adopted unanimously on June 15, 2007, after reaffirming all resolutions on the situation in Cyprus, particularly Resolution 1251 (1999), the Council extended the mandate of the United Nations Peacekeeping Force in Cyprus (UNFICYP) for six months until December 15, 2007.

== Resolution ==
=== Observations ===
The Security Council called on both Cyprus and Northern Cyprus to urgently address the humanitarian issue of missing persons. It noted the Secretary-General Ban Ki-moon's assessment that the a solution to the dispute lies with Cypriots themselves and the supportive role of the United Nations in this process, and that the situation on the island as a whole remained generally calm.

Both sides were urged to refrain from actions that would increase tension. The resolution welcomed crossings of Greek to the north and Turkish Cypriots to the south and the opening of additional crossing points, including Ledra Street. It noted that the situation in the buffer zone would be improved if both sides accepted the 1989 aide-memoire used by the United Nations.

There was concern that opportunities for public debate about the future of the island had become fewer, though attempts at bi-communal contacts were welcomed. Furthermore, there was concern at demining progress in buffer zone and the Turkish Cypriot side was urged to resume demining activities.

The resolution went on to welcome the efforts the contributions of Greece and Cyprus to the peacekeeping operation, and efforts relating to the prevention of HIV/AIDS in the peacekeeping mission.

=== Acts ===
Extending UNFICYP's mandate, the resolution called on both sides to discuss the demarcation process as a matter of urgency, further endorsing UNFICYP's efforts to implement the sexual exploitation policy. It urged the Turkish Cypriot side to restore the military status quo that existed at Strovilia prior to June 30, 2000.

The Council requested the Secretary-General to report by December 1, 2007, on progress made.

== See also ==
- Annan Plan for Cyprus
- Cyprus problem
- List of United Nations Security Council Resolutions 1701 to 1800 (2006–2008)
- United Nations Buffer Zone in Cyprus
- Turkish invasion of Cyprus
