= United Nations Security Council Resolution 1277 =

UN Security Council Resolution 1277
- The flag of Haiti
- Date: 30 November 1999
- Meeting no.: 4,074
- Code: S/RES/1277 (Document)
- Subject: The question concerning Haiti
- Voting summary: 14 voted for; None voted against; 1 abstained
- Result: Adopted

Security Council composition
- Permanent members: China; France; Russia; United Kingdom; United States
- Non-permanent members: Argentina; Bahrain; Brazil; Canada; Gabon; Gambia; Malaysia; Namibia; Netherlands; Slovenia

United Nations Security Council resolution 1277, adopted on 30 November 1999, after recalling all relevant resolutions on Haiti including Resolution 1212 (1998), the Council extended the mandate of the United Nations Civilian Police Mission in Haiti (MIPONUH) pending the transition to a civilian group by 15 March 2000.

The Security Council took note of a request by the Haitian government for the establishment of an International Civilian Support Mission in Haiti (MICAH) in the country. Various United Nations operations had contributed significantly to the professionalisation of the Haitian National Police and the development of its judiciary and national institutions.

The Secretary-General Kofi Annan was requested to co-ordinate the transition from MIPONUH and the International Civilian Mission in Haiti (MICAH) to MICAH and report on the implementation of the current resolution by 1 March 2000.

Resolution 1277, drafted by Argentina, Brazil, Canada, France, the United States and Venezuela, was adopted by 14 votes to none against with one abstention from Russia. The Russian representative said the text was at variance with the request of Haiti, which had requested a non-uniformed presence; rather, Russia had supported a multi-faceted civilian presence in the country.

== See also ==
- History of Haiti
- List of United Nations Security Council Resolutions 1201 to 1300 (1998–2000)
- Operation Uphold Democracy
- United Nations Mission in Haiti
