= United Nations Security Council Resolution 1219 =

UN Security Council Resolution 1219
- Angola
- Date: 31 December 1998
- Meeting no.: 3,962
- Code: S/RES/1219 (Document)
- Subject: The situation in Angola
- Voting summary: 15 voted for; None voted against; None abstained
- Result: Adopted

Security Council composition
- Permanent members: China; France; Russia; United Kingdom; United States
- Non-permanent members: Bahrain; Brazil; Costa Rica; Gabon; Gambia; Japan; Kenya; Portugal; Slovenia; Sweden

United Nations Security Council resolution 1219, adopted unanimously on 31 December 1998, after reaffirming Resolution 696 (1991) and all subsequent resolutions on Angola, particularly resolutions 1202 (1998) and 1213 (1998), the Council condemned the absence of actions to determine the fate of crew and passengers aboard Transafrik International Flight 806 which crashed on 26 December 1998.

The Security Council expressed extreme concern at the crash of Transafrik International Flight 806 and at the disappearance of other aircraft over Angolan territory controlled by UNITA. It deplored the lack of co-operation in clarifying the circumstances of the incident and permitting a United Nations search and rescue mission. The Council demanded that Jonas Savimbi, the leader of UNITA, respond immediately to appeals from the United Nations to search and rescue possible survivors of Flight 806. The flight had 14 people on board and crashed 16 miles from Huambo.

The resolution continued by expressing further concern about the increasing number of vanishing aircraft over UNITA territory and condemned the lack of co-operation to determine the fate of crews and passengers involved in these incidents. UNITA in particular had to facilitate investigations into the disappearances; if there was no compliance with the current resolution by 11 January 1999, further action would be taken.

Finally, all countries were reminded to comply in the implementation of sanctions against UNITA imposed in resolutions 864 (1993), 1127 (1997) and 1173 (1998).

== See also ==
- Angolan Civil War
- List of United Nations Security Council Resolutions 1201 to 1300 (1998–2000)
- United Nations Security Council Resolution 1221
