= United Nations Security Council Resolution 1235 =

UN Security Council Resolution 1235
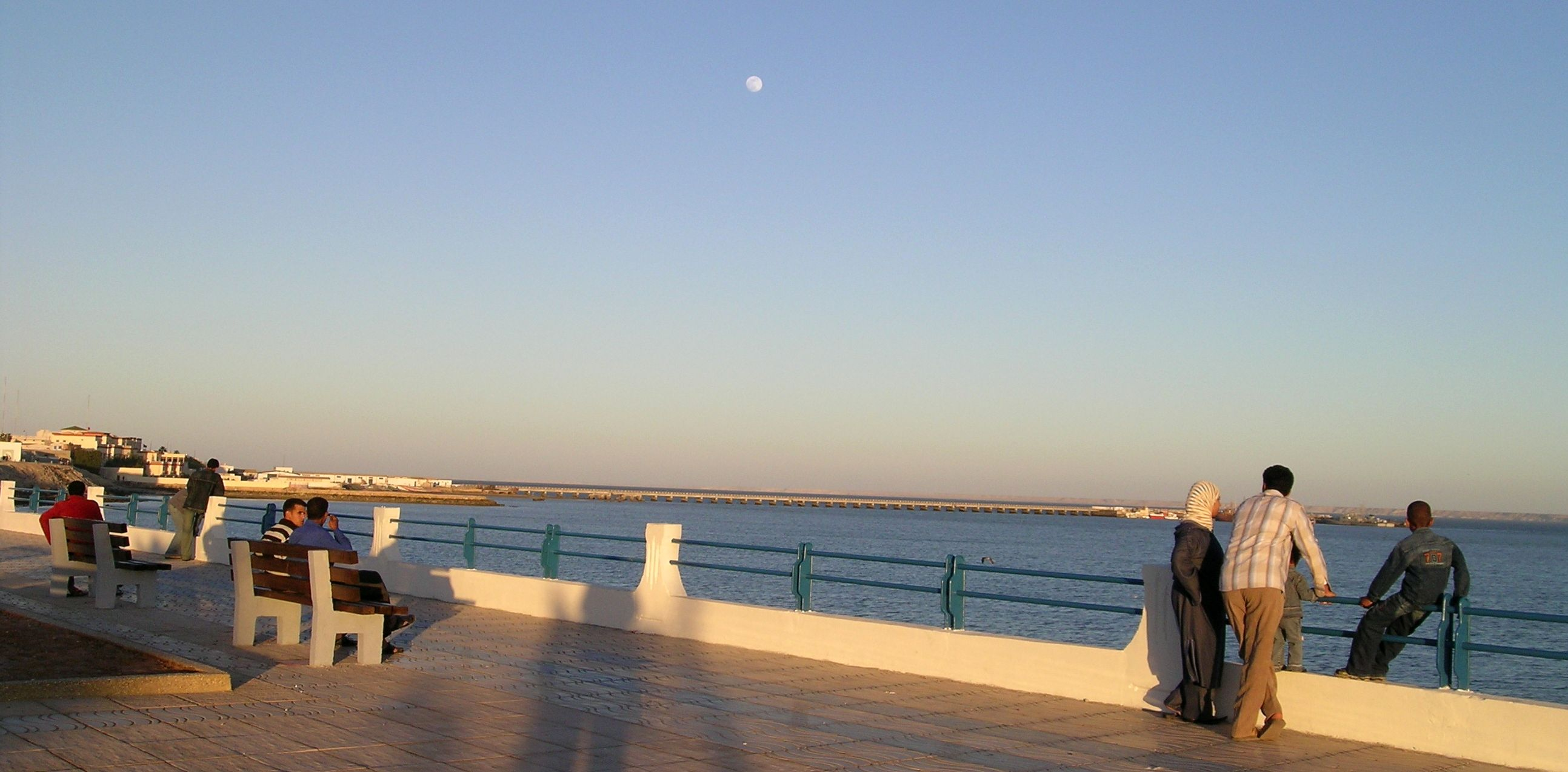
- Western Sahara coast
- Date: 30 April 1999
- Meeting no.: 3,994
- Code: S/RES/1235 (Document)
- Subject: The situation concerning Western Sahara
- Voting summary: 15 voted for; None voted against; None abstained
- Result: Adopted

Security Council composition
- Permanent members: China; France; Russia; United Kingdom; United States
- Non-permanent members: Argentina; Bahrain; Brazil; Canada; Gabon; Gambia; Malaysia; Namibia; Netherlands; Slovenia

United Nations Security Council resolution 1235, adopted unanimously on 30 April 1999, after reaffirming all previous resolutions on the question of the Western Sahara, the Council extended the mandate of the United Nations Mission for the Referendum in Western Sahara (MINURSO) for a further two weeks until 14 May 1999.

The Council noted a report of the Secretary-General Kofi Annan and his recommendations. In the report, he stated that timely implementation of the revised timetable was predicated among many issues: the full deployment of MINURSO troops by July 1999; co-operation of both parties in the voter identification process; the completion of repatriation arrangements by the end of 1999; the deployment of military units, police and military observers by January 2000; reduction and confinement of troops on both sides; the proclamation of a general amnesty. Therefore, the Secretary-General recommended that MINURSO's mandate be extended until 30 October 1999.

The Secretary-General was instructed to keep the Council informed on developments in the Settlement Plan, particularly with respect to discussions between the Government of Morocco and Polisario Front and the viability of MINURSO's mandate.

== See also ==
- Free Zone (region)
- History of Western Sahara
- List of United Nations Security Council Resolutions 1201 to 1300 (1998–2000)
- Sahrawi Arab Democratic Republic
- Moroccan Western Sahara Wall
