= List of United Nations Security Council Resolutions 1201 to 1300 =

This is a list of United Nations Security Council Resolutions 1201 to 1300 adopted between 15 October 1998 and 31 May 2000.

Resolution	Date	Vote	Concerns
1201	15 October 1998	15–0–0	Enlarges and extends the mandate of the United Nations Mission in the Central African Republic
1202	15 October 1998	15–0–0	Extends mandate of the United Nations Observer Mission in Angola
1203	24 October 1998	13–0–2 (abstentions: China, Russia)	Compliance with Resolution 1199 on Kosovo
1204	30 October 1998	15–0–0	Extends mandate of the United Nations Mission for the Referendum in Western Sahara
1205	5 November 1998	15–0–0	Condemns Iraq and demands compliance with previous resolutions concerning its weapons programme
1206	12 November 1998	15–0–0	Extends mandate of the United Nations Mission of Observers in Tajikistan
1207	17 November 1998	14–0–1 (abstention: China)	Failure of the Federal Republic of Yugoslavia (Serbia and Montenegro) to execute arrest warrants issued by the International Criminal Tribunal for the former Yugoslavia
1208	19 November 1998	15–0–0	Humanitarian situation and refugee camps in Africa
1209	19 November 1998	15–0–0	Illicit arms flows to and within Africa
1210	24 November 1998	15–0–0	Extends Iraqi Oil-for-Food Programme
1211	25 November 1998	15–0–0	Extends mandate of the United Nations Disengagement Observer Force
1212	25 November 1998	13–0–2 (abstentions: China, Russia)	Extends mandate of the United Nations Civilian Police Mission in Haiti
1213	3 December 1998	15–0–0	Extends mandate of the United Nations Observer Mission in Angola for final time
1214	8 December 1998	15–0–0	Civil war in Afghanistan
1215	17 December 1998	15–0–0	Extends mandate of the United Nations Mission for the Referendum in Western Sahara
1216	21 December 1998	15–0–0	Civil war in Guinea-Bissau
1217	22 December 1998	15–0–0	Extends mandate of the United Nations Peacekeeping Force in Cyprus
1218	22 December 1998	15–0–0	Progress towards a settlement of the Cyprus dispute
1219	31 December 1998	15–0–0	Crash of UN Flight 806 and disappearance of other aircraft over UNITA territory in Angola
1220	12 January 1999	15–0–0	Extends mandate of the United Nations Observer Mission in Sierra Leone
1221	12 January 1999	15–0–0	Downing of two UN-charted aircraft and disappearance of other aircraft over UNITA territory in Angola
1222	15 January 1999	15–0–0	Extends mandate of the United Nations Mission of Observers in Prevlaka
1223	28 January 1999	15–0–0	Extends mandate of the United Nations Interim Force in Lebanon
1224	28 January 1999	15–0–0	Extends mandate of the United Nations Mission for the Referendum in Western Sahara
1225	28 January 1999	15–0–0	Extends mandate of the United Nations Observer Mission in Georgia
1226	29 January 1999	15–0–0	Urges Eritrea to accept settlement on war with Ethiopia
1227	10 February 1999	15–0–0	Demands end to war between Eritrea and Ethiopia
1228	11 February 1999	15–0–0	Extends mandate of the United Nations Mission for the Referendum in Western Sahara
1229	26 February 1999	15–0–0	Expiration of mandate of the United Nations Observer Mission in Angola
1230	26 February 1999	15–0–0	Extends the mandate of the United Nations Mission in the Central African Republic
1231	11 March 1999	15–0–0	Extends mandate of the United Nations Observer Mission in Sierra Leone
1232	30 March 1999	15–0–0	Extends mandate of the United Nations Mission for the Referendum in Western Sahara
1233	6 April 1999	15–0–0	Establishes the United Nations Peacebuilding Support Office in Guinea-Bissau; implementation of Abuja Agreement
1234	9 April 1999	15–0–0	War in the Democratic Republic of the Congo
1235	30 April 1999	15–0–0	Extends mandate of the United Nations Mission for the Referendum in Western Sahara
1236	7 May 1999	15–0–0	Welcomes agreement between Portugal and Indonesia on future of East Timor
1237	7 May 1999	15–0–0	Establishes investigation into violations of sanctions against UNITA in Angola
1238	14 May 1999	15–0–0	Extends mandate of the United Nations Mission for the Referendum in Western Sahara
1239	14 May 1999	13–0–2 (abstentions: China, Russia)	Calls for access by United Nations and humanitarian personnel to displaced persons in Kosovo and Montenegro
1240	15 May 1999	15–0–0	Extends mandate of the United Nations Mission of Observers in Tajikistan
1241	19 May 1999	15–0–0	Completion of cases at the International Criminal Tribunal for Rwanda by judges whose terms of office are set to expire
1242	21 May 1999	15–0–0	Extends Iraqi Oil-for-Food Programme
1243	27 May 1999	15–0–0	Extends mandate of the United Nations Disengagement Observer Force
1244	10 June 1999	14–0–1 (abstention: China)	Establishes the United Nations Interim Administration Mission in Kosovo
1245	11 June 1999	15–0–0	Extends mandate of the United Nations Observer Mission in Sierra Leone
1246	11 June 1999	15–0–0	Establishes the United Nations Mission in East Timor
1247	18 June 1999	15–0–0	Extends mandate of the United Nations Mission in Bosnia and Herzegovina and the Stabilisation Force
1248	25 June 1999	Adopted without vote	Admission of Kiribati to the United Nations
1249	25 June 1999	14–0–1 (abstention: China)	Admission of Nauru to the United Nations
1250	29 June 1999	15–0–0	Negotiations for settlement of the Cyprus dispute by the Secretary-General
1251	29 June 1999	15–0–0	Extends mandate of the United Nations Peacekeeping Force in Cyprus
1252	15 July 1999	15–0–0	Extends mandate of the United Nations Mission of Observers in Prevlaka
1253	28 July 1999	Adopted without vote	Admission of Tonga to the United Nations
1254	30 July 1999	15–0–0	Extends mandate of the United Nations Interim Force in Lebanon
1255	30 July 1999	15–0–0	Extends mandate of the United Nations Observer Mission in Georgia; situation in Abkhazia
1256	3 August 1999	15–0–0	Appoints Wolfgang Petritsch as High Representative for Bosnia and Herzegovina
1257	3 August 1999	15–0–0	Extends mandate of the United Nations Mission in East Timor
1258	6 August 1999	15–0–0	Deploys military liaison personnel in the Democratic Republic of the Congo
1259	11 August 1999	15–0–0	Appoints Carla Del Ponte as Prosecutor at the International Criminal Tribunal for the former Yugoslavia and Rwanda
1260	20 August 1999	15–0–0	Strengthens and expands the United Nations Observer Mission in Sierra Leone
1261	25 August 1999	15–0–0	Children in armed conflict
1262	27 August 1999	15–0–0	Extends mandate of the United Nations Mission in East Timor
1263	13 September 1999	15–0–0	Extends mandate of the United Nations Mission for the Referendum in Western Sahara
1264	15 September 1999	15–0–0	Establishes the International Force for East Timor
1265	17 September 1999	15–0–0	Protection of civilians in armed conflict
1266	4 October 1999	15–0–0	Authorises import of Iraqi petroleum or petroleum products up to additional sum of US$3.04 billion
1267	15 October 1999	15–0–0	Sanctions against the Taliban, Al-Qaeda and Osama bin Laden
1268	15 October 1999	15–0–0	Establishes the United Nations Office in Angola
1269	19 October 1999	15–0–0	International co-operation regarding terrorism
1270	22 October 1999	15–0–0	Establishes the United Nations Mission in Sierra Leone
1271	22 October 1999	15–0–0	Extends mandate of the United Nations Mission in the Central African Republic
1272	25 October 1999	15–0–0	Establishes the United Nations Transitional Administration in East Timor
1273	5 November 1999	15–0–0	Extends mandate of military liaison personnel in the Democratic Republic of the Congo
1274	12 November 1999	15–0–0	Extends mandate of the United Nations Mission of Observers in Tajikistan
1275	19 November 1999	15–0–0	Extends Iraqi Oil-for-Food Programme
1276	24 November 1999	15–0–0	Extends mandate of the United Nations Disengagement Observer Force
1277	30 November 1999	14–0–1 (abstention: Russia)	Extends mandate of the United Nations Civilian Police Mission in Haiti; transition
1278	30 November 1999	Adopted without a vote	Vacancy and elections at the International Court of Justice
1279	30 November 1999	15–0–0	Establishes the United Nations Mission in the Democratic Republic of the Congo
1280	3 December 1999	11–0–3 (abstentions: China, Malaysia, Russia; France did not participate)	Extends Iraqi Oil-for-Food Programme
1281	10 December 1999	15–0–0	Extends Iraqi Oil-for-Food Programme
1282	14 December 1999	14–0–1 (abstention: Namibia)	Extends mandate of the United Nations Mission for the Referendum in Western Sahara
1283	15 December 1999	15–0–0	Extends mandate of the United Nations Peacekeeping Force in Cyprus
1284	17 December 1999	11–0–4 (abstentions: China, France, Malaysia, Russia)	Establishes the United Nations Monitoring, Verification and Inspection Commission
1285	13 January 2000	15–0–0	Extends mandate of the United Nations Mission of Observers in Prevlaka
1286	19 January 2000	15–0–0	Burundi Civil War
1287	31 January 2000	15–0–0	Extends mandate of the United Nations Observer Mission in Georgia
1288	31 January 2000	15–0–0	Extends mandate of the United Nations Interim Force in Lebanon
1289	7 February 2000	15–0–0	Extends and expands mandate of the United Nations Mission in Sierra Leone
1290	17 February 2000	14–0–1 (abstention: China)	Admission of Tuvalu to the United Nations
1291	24 February 2000	15–0–0	Extends and expands mandate of the United Nations Mission in the Democratic Republic of Congo
1292	29 February 2000	15–0–0	Extends mandate of the United Nations Mission for the Referendum in Western Sahara
1293	31 March 2000	15–0–0	Doubles amount Iraq may spend for oil spare parts, equipment
1294	13 April 2000	15–0–0	Extends mandate of the United Nations Office in Angola
1295	18 April 2000	15–0–0	Reaffirming resolution 864 and all subsequent resolutions on Angola
1296	19 April 2000	15–0–0	Protection of civilians in armed conflicts
1297	12 May 2000	15–0–0	Demands end to conflict between Eritrea and Ethiopia
1298	17 May 2000	15–0–0	Imposes arms embargo on Eritrea and Ethiopia
1299	19 May 2000	15–0–0	Expands military component of the United Nations Mission in Sierra Leone
1300	31 May 2000	15–0–0	Extends mandate of the United Nations Disengagement Observer Force

== See also ==
- Lists of United Nations Security Council resolutions
- List of United Nations Security Council Resolutions 1101 to 1200
- List of United Nations Security Council Resolutions 1301 to 1400
