= United Nations Security Council Resolution 1274 =

UN Security Council Resolution 1274
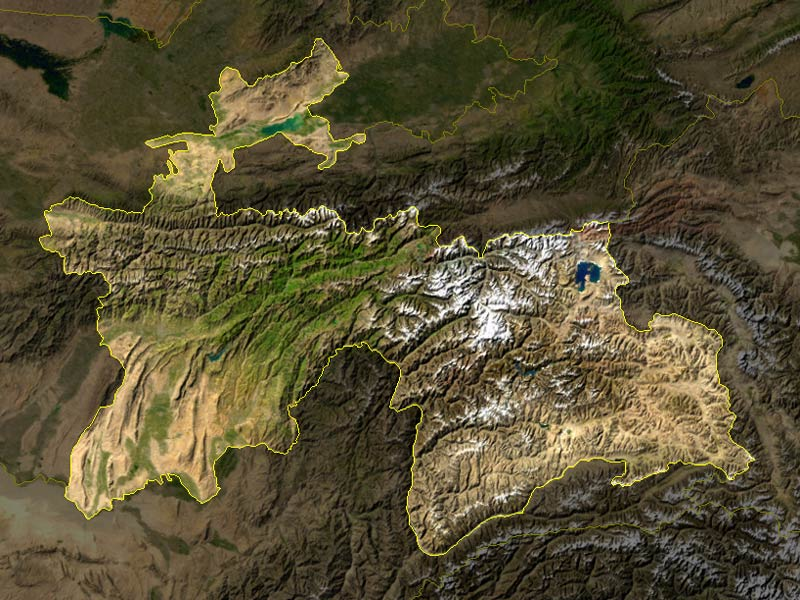
- Satellite view of Tajikistan
- Date: 12 November 1999
- Meeting no.: 4,064
- Code: S/RES/1274 (Document)
- Subject: The situation in Tajikistan and along the Tajik-Afghan border
- Voting summary: 15 voted for; None voted against; None abstained
- Result: Adopted

Security Council composition
- Permanent members: China; France; Russia; United Kingdom; United States
- Non-permanent members: Argentina; Bahrain; Brazil; Canada; Gabon; Gambia; Malaysia; Namibia; Netherlands; Slovenia

United Nations Security Council resolution 1274, adopted unanimously on 12 November 1999, after recalling all resolutions on the situation in Tajikistan and along the Tajik-Afghan border, the Council extended the mandate of the United Nations Mission of Observers in Tajikistan (UNMOT) for a further six months until 15 May 2000 and addressed preparations for upcoming parliamentary elections in the country.

In the preamble of the resolution, the Council noted that significant progress had been made in the peace progress in Tajikistan. The United Tajik Opposition (UTO) said it would disband its units and the Supreme Court had lifted restrictions and a ban on the political parties of the UTO. It acknowledged that presidential elections had taken place on 6 November 1999. The security situation had remained calm in most parts of the country though some areas remained tense.

The parties were called upon to take further action to fully implement the peace agreement and preparations towards free, fair and democratic parliamentary elections. The Council reiterated the importance of involvement of the United Nations and Organization for Security and Co-operation in Europe (OSCE) in the preparations and monitoring of the parliamentary elections as it was the last major event in the transition phase envisaged in the peace agreement.

The humanitarian situation in Tajikistan remained a concern for the Security Council, and Member States were called upon to make voluntary contributions towards projects for demobilisation and reintegration and support for the elections. The Secretary-General Kofi Annan was requested to report on the situation in the country after the parliamentary elections and within four months of the adoption of the current resolution, particularly with regard to the future role of the United Nations in Tajikistan.

== See also ==
- Tajikistani Civil War
- History of Tajikistan
- List of United Nations Security Council Resolutions 1201 to 1300 (1998–2000)
