= United Nations Security Council Resolution 1268 =

UN Security Council Resolution 1268
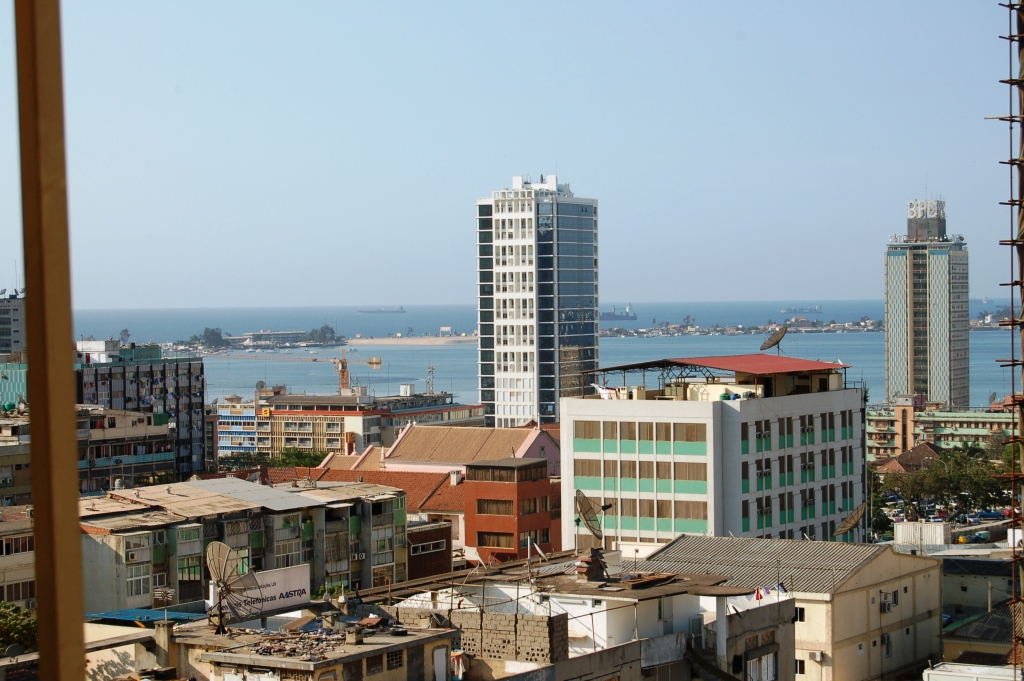
- Angolan capital Luanda
- Date: 15 October 1999
- Meeting no.: 4,052
- Code: S/RES/1268 (Document)
- Subject: The situation in Angola
- Voting summary: 15 voted for; None voted against; None abstained
- Result: Adopted

Security Council composition
- Permanent members: China; France; Russia; United Kingdom; United States
- Non-permanent members: Argentina; Bahrain; Brazil; Canada; Gabon; Gambia; Malaysia; Namibia; Netherlands; Slovenia

United Nations Security Council resolution 1268, adopted unanimously on 15 October 1999, after reaffirming Resolution 696 (1991) and all subsequent resolutions on Angola, particularly resolutions 1229 (1999) and 1237 (1999), the council established the United Nations Office in Angola (UNOA) to liaise with political, military, police and other civilian authorities.

The security council reaffirmed that the present situation in Angola was caused by the failure of UNITA under the leadership of Jonas Savimbi to comply with its obligations under the Accordos de Paz, Lusaka Protocol and relevant Security Council resolutions. National reconciliation and lasting peace could only be achieved through the implementation of the aforementioned agreements and the continued presence of the United Nations in Angola was necessary.

UNOA would be established for an initial period of six months until 15 April 2000 staffed with 30 personnel and support staff necessary to liaise with political, military, police and other civilian authorities in Angola to explore measures to restore peace, promote human rights and provide humanitarian assistance. The Angolan government and the Secretary-General Kofi Annan were called upon to conclude a Status of Forces Agreement and the latter requested to report every three months with recommendations on the peace process and other developments.

== See also ==
- Angolan Civil War
- List of United Nations Security Council Resolutions 1201 to 1300 (1998–2000)
