= United Nations Security Council Resolution 1206 =

UN Security Council Resolution 1206
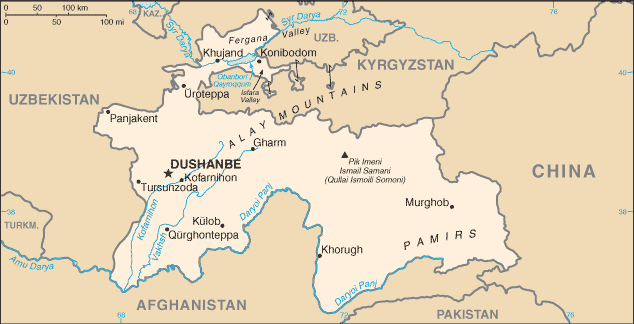
- Tajikistan (pre-2011 borders)
- Date: 12 November 1998
- Meeting no.: 3,943
- Code: S/RES/1206 (Document)
- Subject: The situation in Tajikistan and along the Tajik-Afghan border
- Voting summary: 15 voted for; None voted against; None abstained
- Result: Adopted

Security Council composition
- Permanent members: China; France; Russia; United Kingdom; United States
- Non-permanent members: Bahrain; Brazil; Costa Rica; Gabon; Gambia; Japan; Kenya; Portugal; Slovenia; Sweden

United Nations Security Council resolution 1206, adopted unanimously on 12 November 1998, after recalling all resolutions on the situation in Tajikistan and along the Tajik-Afghan border, the Council extended the mandate of the United Nations Mission of Observers in Tajikistan (UNMOT) for a further six months until 15 May 1999.

In Tajikistan there were moves to implement the peace accords and a maintenance of the ceasefire. The Tajik government and United Tajik Opposition (UTO) were in close contact in an attempt to resolve the crisis. The Council noted that the security situation in parts of the country remained precarious and there were delays in establishing the facts surrounding the murder for four members of UNMOT–a Japanese civil affairs officer, Polish and Uruguayan Majors and a Tajik interpreter–in July 1998.

The resolution condemned recent fighting in the Khujand area and the parties were called upon to implement the General Agreement and to create conditions to facilitate the holding of elections. The murders of UNMOT personnel were also strongly condemned and the completion of the investigation by the Tajik government was essential for the resumption of its activities on the ground. The Council welcomed the contribution of the Commonwealth of Independent States peacekeeping forces. Both parties in Tajikistan were reminded that the commitment of the international community depended on the safety of international personnel.

Finally, the Secretary-General Kofi Annan was asked to keep the Council informed on developments and to report back within three months.

== See also ==
- Tajikistani Civil War
- History of Tajikistan
- List of United Nations Security Council Resolutions 1201 to 1300 (1998–2000)
