= United Nations Security Council Resolution 1276 =

UN Security Council Resolution 1276
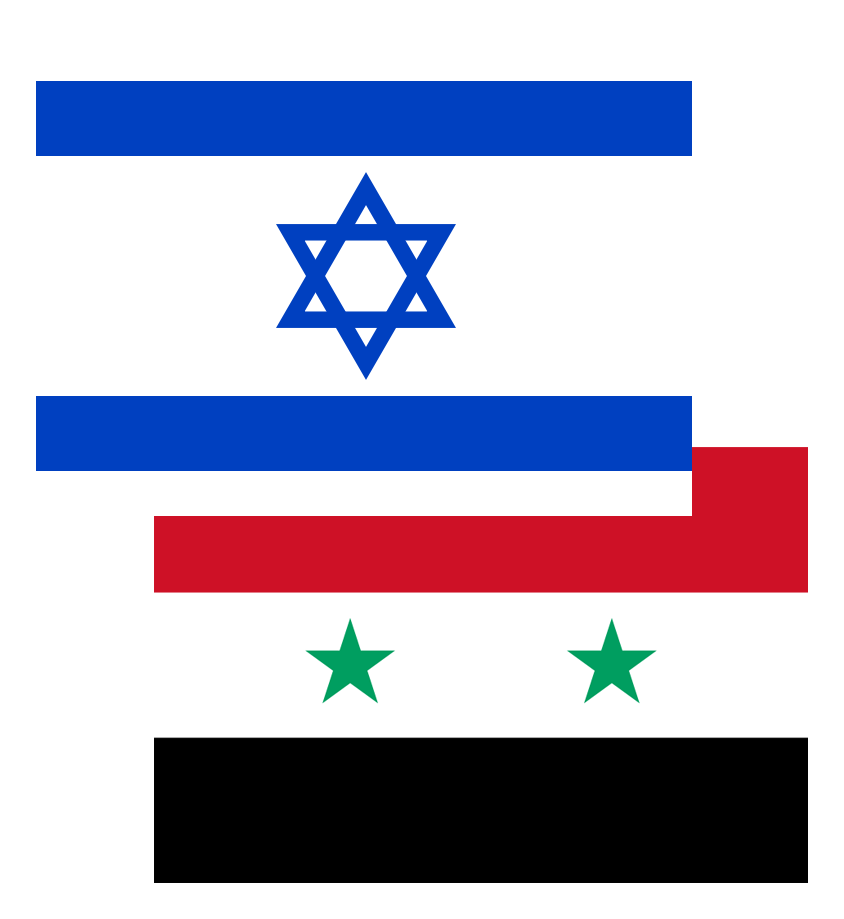
- Israeli and Syrian flags
- Date: 24 November 1999
- Meeting no.: 4,071
- Code: S/RES/1276 (Document)
- Subject: The situation in the Middle East
- Voting summary: 15 voted for; None voted against; None abstained
- Result: Adopted

Security Council composition
- Permanent members: China; France; Russia; United Kingdom; United States
- Non-permanent members: Argentina; Bahrain; Brazil; Canada; Gabon; Gambia; Malaysia; Namibia; Netherlands; Slovenia

United Nations Security Council resolution 1276, adopted unanimously on 24 November 1999, after considering a report by the Secretary-General Kofi Annan regarding the United Nations Disengagement Observer Force (UNDOF), the Council extended its mandate for a further six months until 31 May 2000.

The resolution called upon the parties concerned to immediately implement Resolution 338 (1973) and requested that the Secretary-General submit a report on the situation at the end of that period.

The Secretary-General's report pursuant to the previous resolution on UNDOF said that the situation between Israel and Syria had remained calm with no serious incidents though the situation in the Middle East as a whole remained dangerous until a settlement could be reached.

== See also ==
- Arab–Israeli conflict
- Golan Heights
- Israel–Syria relations
- List of United Nations Security Council Resolutions 1201 to 1300 (1998–2000)
