= United Nations Security Council Resolution 1286 =

UN Security Council Resolution 1286
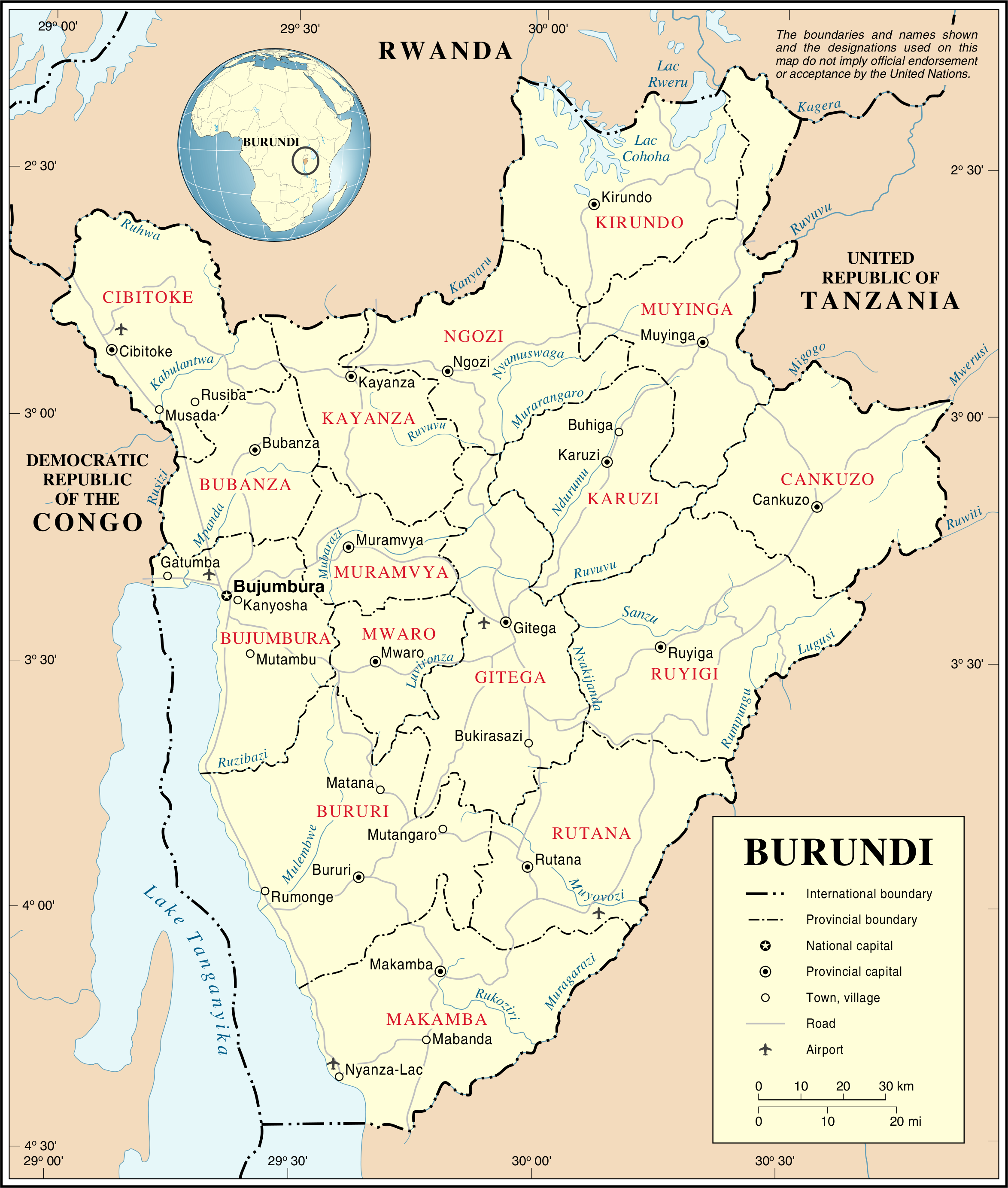
- Burundi
- Date: 19 January 2000
- Meeting no.: 4,091
- Code: S/RES/1286 (Document)
- Subject: The situation in Burundi
- Voting summary: 15 voted for; None voted against; None abstained
- Result: Adopted

Security Council composition
- Permanent members: China; France; Russia; United Kingdom; United States
- Non-permanent members: Argentina; Bangladesh; Canada; Jamaica; Malaysia; Mali; Namibia; Netherlands; Tunisia; Ukraine

United Nations Security Council resolution 1286, adopted unanimously on 19 January 2000, after reaffirming all resolutions and statements by the President of the Security Council on the civil war in Burundi, the council supported the efforts of former South African President Nelson Mandela in reaching a political settlement to the conflict in the country.

The security council was concerned at the dire economic, humanitarian and social conditions in Burundi. There was ongoing violence and insecurity, marked by increasing attacks on civilians by armed groups in and around the capital Bujumbura, and concern for its implications on security in the region. The council recognised the important role that countries in the region, particularly Tanzania, which hosted thousands of Burundian refugees. It reaffirmed that the Arusha peace process was the basis of a resolution of the conflict.

The appointment of Nelson Mandela as the facilitator of the Arusha peace process at the Eighth Arusha Regional Summit in December 1999 was warmly welcomed by the council. In this context it reaffirmed its support for the Arusha peace process and for all parties in Burundi to co-operate. It commended those parties that were committed to negotiations and asked those that were not to immediately cease hostilities.

The resolution strongly condemned the murder of personnel from the United Nations Children's Fund and World Food Programme in Rutana Province in October 1999. Neighbouring countries of Burundi were called upon to take action against insurgents and illicit weapons transfers and to ensure the neutrality, security and civilian character of refugee camps. Donors and the international community were urged to provide humanitarian assistance and examine the economic development needs of Burundi.

== See also ==
- Burundi Civil War
- History of Burundi
- List of United Nations Security Council Resolutions 1201 to 1300 (1998–2000)
