= United Nations Security Council Resolution 1241 =

UN Security Council Resolution 1241
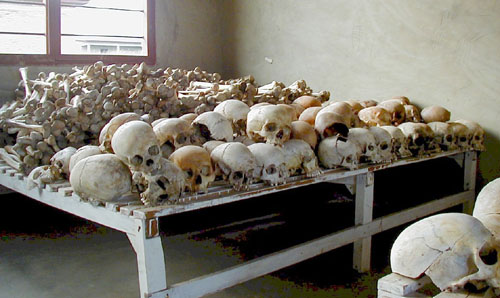
- Skulls of the victims of the Rwandan Genocide
- Date: 19 May 1999
- Meeting no.: 4,006
- Code: S/RES/1241 (Document)
- Subject: The International Tribunal for Rwanda
- Voting summary: 15 voted for; None voted against; None abstained
- Result: Adopted

Security Council composition
- Permanent members: China; France; Russia; United Kingdom; United States
- Non-permanent members: Argentina; Bahrain; Brazil; Canada; Gabon; Gambia; Malaysia; Namibia; Netherlands; Slovenia

United Nations Security Council resolution 1241, adopted unanimously on 19 May 1999, after noting a letter to the President of the Security Council from the President of the International Criminal Tribunal for Rwanda (ICTR), the Council endorsed a recommendation of the Secretary-General Kofi Annan that judge Lennart Aspegren complete the Georges Rutaganda and Alfred Musema cases which had begun before the expiry of his term of office.

Both cases were set to be completed by 31 January 2000. Aspegren's term of office was due to end on 24 May 1999 while both cases were still in proceedings in Chamber I of the ICTR.

== See also ==
- List of United Nations Security Council Resolutions 1201 to 1300 (1998–2000)
- Rwandan genocide
- United Nations Observer Mission Uganda–Rwanda
