= United Nations Security Council Resolution 1259 =

UN Security Council Resolution 1259
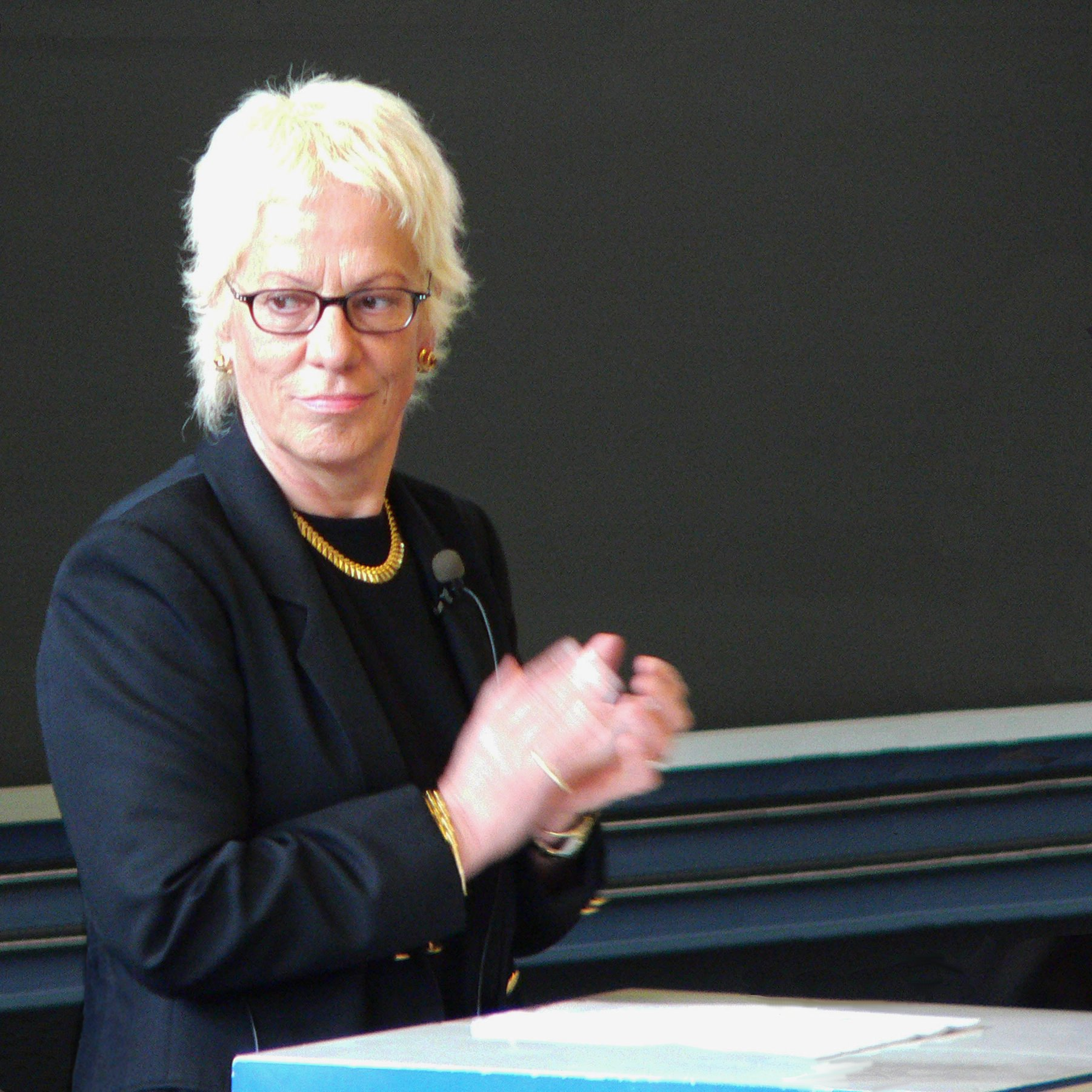
- Carla Del Ponte
- Date: 11 August 1999
- Meeting no.: 4,033
- Code: S/RES/1259 (Document)
- Subject: Appointment of Prosecutor at the ICTY and ICTR
- Voting summary: 15 voted for; None voted against; None abstained
- Result: Adopted

Security Council composition
- Permanent members: China; France; Russia; United Kingdom; United States
- Non-permanent members: Argentina; Bahrain; Brazil; Canada; Gabon; Gambia; Malaysia; Namibia; Netherlands; Slovenia

United Nations Security Council resolution 1259, adopted unanimously on 11 August 1999, after recalling resolutions 808 (1993), 827 (1993), 936 (1994), 955 (1994) and 1047 (1996), the Council appointed Carla Del Ponte as Prosecutor at the International Criminal Tribunal for Rwanda (ICTR) and the International Criminal Tribunal for the former Yugoslavia (ICTY).

The Council noted the resignation of the former Prosecutor, Louise Arbour, with effect from 15 September 1999, and decided that term of Carla Del Ponte, a Swiss attorney general, would begin on that date.

== See also ==
- Bosnian Genocide
- Rwandan genocide
- List of United Nations Security Council Resolutions 1201 to 1300 (1998–2000)
- Yugoslav Wars
- List of United Nations Security Council Resolutions related to the conflicts in former Yugoslavia
