= United Nations Security Council Resolution 1227 =

UN Security Council Resolution 1227
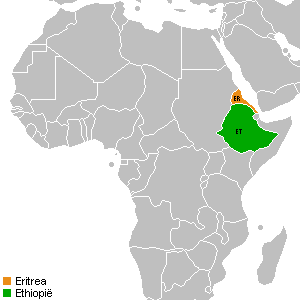
- Eritrea (orange) and Ethiopia (green)
- Date: 10 February 1999
- Meeting no.: 3,975
- Code: S/RES/1227 (Document)
- Subject: The situation between Eritrea and Ethiopia
- Voting summary: 15 voted for; None voted against; None abstained
- Result: Adopted

Security Council composition
- Permanent members: China; France; Russia; United Kingdom; United States
- Non-permanent members: Argentina; Bahrain; Brazil; Canada; Gabon; Gambia; Malaysia; Namibia; Netherlands; Slovenia

United Nations Security Council resolution 1227, adopted unanimously on 10 February 1999, after reaffirming resolutions 1177 (1998) and 1226 (1999) on the situation between Eritrea and Ethiopia, the Council demanded an immediate cessation of hostilities between the two countries.

In the preamble of the resolution, the Council expressed concern at the border conflict between Ethiopia and Eritrea, and recalled the commitment of both countries to a moratorium on the threat of and use of air strikes. It stressed that the current situation posed a threat to peace and security.

The Security Council condemned the resumption of hostilities by both countries and demanded an immediate halt to air strikes. Furthermore, it demanded that both countries resume diplomatic efforts towards a peaceful settlement of the conflict and noted that the Framework Agreement proposed by the Organisation of African Unity (OAU) remained a basis for a settlement. Eritrea later accepted the agreement.

The resolution concluded by requesting both Eritrea and Ethiopia to guarantee the safety of civilians and ensure respect for human rights and international humanitarian law and called upon all countries to immediately end the sale of weapons and ammunition to both countries.

== See also ==
- Eritrean–Ethiopian War
- List of United Nations Security Council Resolutions 1201 to 1300 (1998–2000)
- United Nations Mission in Ethiopia and Eritrea
