= United Nations Security Council Resolution 1229 =

UN Security Council Resolution 1229
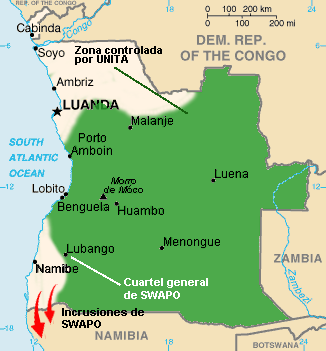
- Maximum extent of UNITA territory in Angola
- Date: 26 February 1999
- Meeting no.: 3,983
- Code: S/RES/1229 (Document)
- Subject: The situation in Angola
- Voting summary: 15 voted for; None voted against; None abstained
- Result: Adopted

Security Council composition
- Permanent members: China; France; Russia; United Kingdom; United States
- Non-permanent members: Argentina; Bahrain; Brazil; Canada; Gabon; Gambia; Malaysia; Namibia; Netherlands; Slovenia

United Nations Security Council resolution 1229, adopted unanimously on 26 February 1999, after reaffirming Resolution 696 (1991) and all subsequent resolutions on Angola, particularly resolutions 864 (1993), 1127 (1997), 1173 (1998), 1219 (1998) and 1221 (1999), the council dissolved the United Nations Observer Mission in Angola (MONUA) though its human rights component would remain.

The security council stressed the importance of the implementation of the Acordos de Paz, Lusaka Protocol and relevant Security Council resolutions which UNITA, under the leadership of Jonas Savimbi, had failed under its obligations to fully comply with. There was concern about the consequences on the humanitarian situation. It noted that the United Nations had contributed to the relative peace in Angola to the past four years but regretted that the present situation restricted MONUA's ability to carry out its mandate. The continuining presence of the United Nations would help contribute to national reconciliation in the country.

The resolution noted that the mandate of MONUA expired on 26 February 1999 though its Status of Forces Agreement remained in effect. The human rights component would remain in Angola during the liquidation period of MONUA. The Secretary-General Kofi Annan was asked to discuss the future United Nations presence with the Angolan government. All parties concerned were urged to undertake humanitarian efforts.

Finally, the Council expressed concern at the lack of progress in investigating the downing of the two United Nations chartered aircraft and the loss of other commercial aircraft under suspicious circumstances over UNITA-controlled areas in the country, and reiterated that UNITA should co-operate in the investigations.

== See also ==
- Angolan Civil War
- List of United Nations Security Council Resolutions 1201 to 1300 (1998–2000)
