= United Nations Security Council Resolution 1224 =

UN Security Council Resolution 1224
- MINURSO ribbon bar
- Date: 28 January 1999
- Meeting no.: 3,971
- Code: S/RES/1224 (Document)
- Subject: The situation concerning Western Sahara
- Voting summary: 15 voted for; None voted against; None abstained
- Result: Adopted

Security Council composition
- Permanent members: China; France; Russia; United Kingdom; United States
- Non-permanent members: Argentina; Bahrain; Brazil; Canada; Gabon; Gambia; Malaysia; Namibia; Netherlands; Slovenia

United Nations Security Council resolution 1224, adopted unanimously on 28 January 1999, after reaffirming all previous resolutions on the question of the Western Sahara, the Council extended the mandate of the United Nations Mission for the Referendum in Western Sahara (MINURSO) until 11 February 1999.

The resolution requested the Secretary-General to keep the Council updated on developments, including the implementation of the Settlement Plan, the agreements reached between both the Government of Morocco and the Polisario Front and the viability of MINURSO's mandate.

== See also ==
- Free Zone (region)
- History of Western Sahara
- List of United Nations Security Council Resolutions 1201 to 1300 (1998–2000)
- Sahrawi Arab Democratic Republic
- Wall (Western Sahara)
