= United Nations Security Council Resolution 1232 =

UN Security Council Resolution 1232
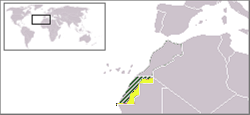
- Western Sahara
- Date: 30 March 1999
- Meeting no.: 3,990
- Code: S/RES/1232 (Document)
- Subject: The situation concerning Western Sahara
- Voting summary: 15 voted for; None voted against; None abstained
- Result: Adopted

Security Council composition
- Permanent members: China; France; Russia; United Kingdom; United States
- Non-permanent members: Argentina; Bahrain; Brazil; Canada; Gabon; Gambia; Malaysia; Namibia; Netherlands; Slovenia

United Nations Security Council resolution 1232, adopted unanimously on 30 March 1999, after reaffirming all previous resolutions on the question of the Western Sahara, the Council extended the mandate of the United Nations Mission for the Referendum in Western Sahara (MINURSO) until 30 April 1999.

The Security Council extended MINURSO's mandate to allow for an understanding between Morocco, the Polisario Front and United Nations concerning implementation of the voter identification and appeals protocols and to continue talks on the return of refugees, welcoming the resumption of pre-registration activities by the United Nations High Commissioner for Refugees in Tindouf, Algeria. It welcomed an agreement between the Moroccan government and MINURSO Force Commander on mines and unexploded ordnance.

Finally, the Secretary-General Kofi Annan was instructed to submit a report by 23 April 1999 on the implementation of the current resolution.

== See also ==
- Free Zone (region)
- History of Western Sahara
- List of United Nations Security Council Resolutions 1201 to 1300 (1998–2000)
- Sahrawi Arab Democratic Republic
- Moroccan Western Sahara Wall
