= United Nations Security Council Resolution 1288 =

UN Security Council Resolution 1288
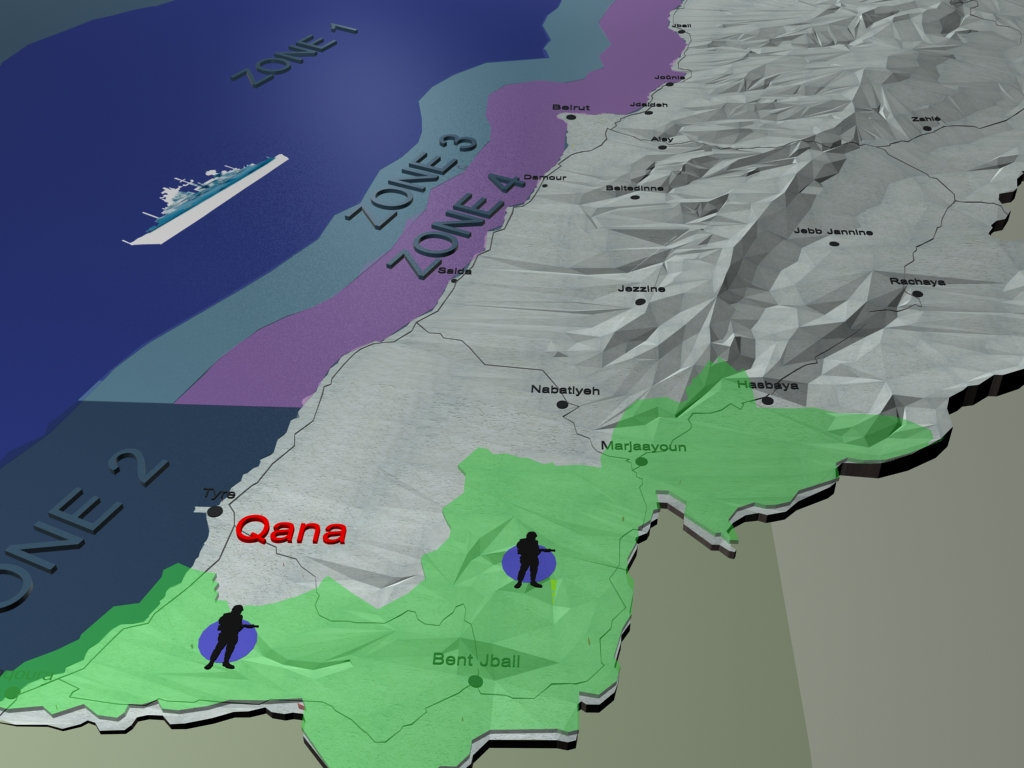
- UNIFIL zone of operation
- Date: 31 January 2000
- Meeting no.: 4,095
- Code: S/RES/1288 (Document)
- Subject: The situation in the Middle East
- Voting summary: 15 voted for; None voted against; None abstained
- Result: Adopted

Security Council composition
- Permanent members: China; France; Russia; United Kingdom; United States
- Non-permanent members: Argentina; Bangladesh; Canada; Jamaica; Malaysia; Mali; Namibia; Netherlands; Tunisia; Ukraine

United Nations Security Council resolution 1288, adopted unanimously on 31 January 2000, after recalling previous resolutions on Israel and Lebanon, including resolutions 425 (1978), 426 (1978), 501 (1982), 508 (1982), 509 (1982) and 520 (1982) as well as studying the report by the Secretary-General on the United Nations Interim Force in Lebanon (UNIFIL), the Council decided to extend the mandate of UNIFIL for a further six months until 31 July 2000.

The Council reemphasised the mandate of the Force and requested the Secretary-General to continue negotiations with the Government of Lebanon and other parties concerned with regard to the implementation of resolutions 425 (1978) and 426 (1978) and report thereon.

All violence against UNIFIL was condemned with the parties urged to put a stop to attacks on the Force. The Secretary-General Kofi Annan had reported a reduction in the fighting between the Israel Defense Forces, South Lebanon Army and Hezbollah in Southern Lebanon. In a significant political development, talks between Israel and Syria under the auspicies of the United States had commenced. Further efficiency savings were encouraged provided they did not affect the operational capacity of the operation.

== See also ==
- List of United Nations Security Council Resolutions 1201 to 1300 (1998–2000)
- South Lebanon conflict (1985–2000)
