= United Nations Security Council Resolution 1254 =

UN Security Council Resolution 1254
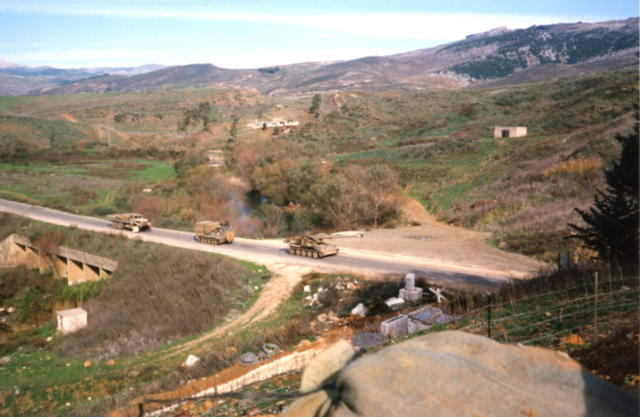
- IDF tanks in South Lebanon
- Date: 30 July 1999
- Meeting no.: 4,028
- Code: S/RES/1254 (Document)
- Subject: The situation in the Middle East
- Voting summary: 15 voted for; None voted against; None abstained
- Result: Adopted

Security Council composition
- Permanent members: China; France; Russia; United Kingdom; United States
- Non-permanent members: Argentina; Bahrain; Brazil; Canada; Gabon; Gambia; Malaysia; Namibia; Netherlands; Slovenia

United Nations Security Council resolution 1254, adopted unanimously on 30 July 1999, after recalling previous resolutions on Israel and Lebanon including 501 (1982), 508 (1982), 509 (1982) and 520 (1982) as well as studying the report by the Secretary-General on the United Nations Interim Force in Lebanon (UNIFIL) approved in 426 (1978), the Council decided to extend the mandate of UNIFIL for a further six months until 31 January 2000.

The Council then reemphasised the mandate of the Force and requested the Secretary-General to continue negotiations with the Government of Lebanon and other parties concerned with regard to the implementation of resolutions 425 (1978) and 426 (1978) and report thereon.

All violence against UNIFIL was condemned with the parties urged to put a stop to attacks on the Force. The Secretary-General Kofi Annan had reported an increase in fighting between the Israel Defense Forces and South Lebanon Army on one side and the Hezbollah terrorist organization on another in Southern Lebanon, with Israeli air raids against civilian targets compromised by Hezbollah by using them as military facilities in Lebanon, to continue the firing of rockets into northern Israel. A total of 359 incidents were recorded, and both sides were hostile towards UNIFIL during the discharge of its mandate. Further efficiency savings were encouraged provided they did not affect the operational capacity of the operation.

== See also ==
- List of United Nations Security Council Resolutions 1201 to 1300 (1998–2000)
- South Lebanon conflict (1985–2000)
