= United Nations Security Council Resolution 1240 =

UN Security Council Resolution 1240
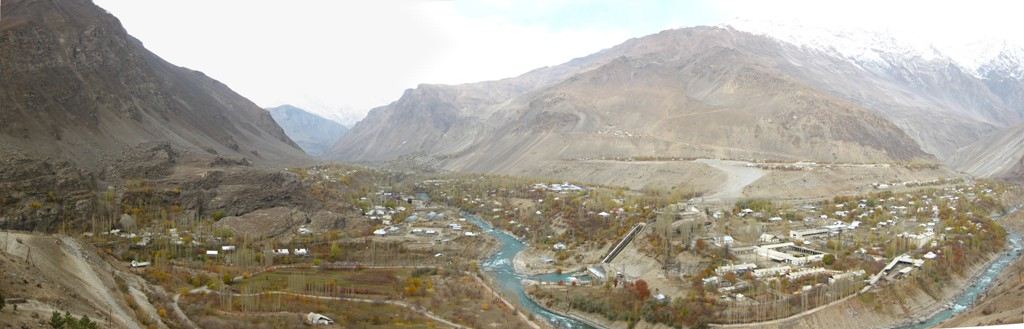
- Khorugh in Tajikistan
- Date: 15 May 1999
- Meeting no.: 4,004
- Code: S/RES/1240 (Document)
- Subject: The situation in Tajikistan and along the Tajik-Afghan border
- Voting summary: 15 voted for; None voted against; None abstained
- Result: Adopted

Security Council composition
- Permanent members: China; France; Russia; United Kingdom; United States
- Non-permanent members: Argentina; Bahrain; Brazil; Canada; Gabon; Gambia; Malaysia; Namibia; Netherlands; Slovenia

United Nations Security Council resolution 1240, adopted unanimously on 15 May 1999, after recalling all resolutions on the situation in Tajikistan and along the Tajik-Afghan border, the Council extended the mandate of the United Nations Mission of Observers in Tajikistan (UNMOT) for a further six months until 15 November 1999.

The Security Council noted the continuing peace process in Tajikistan and the general observance of the ceasefire by the Tajik government and United Tajik Opposition (UTO). The overall situation in the country had improved though some areas remained tense.

The Tajik parties were requested to create the right to create conditions for holding a constitutional referendum and presidential and parliamentary elections and to ensure the safety of United Nations and international personnel in the country. The Organization for Security and Co-operation in Europe (OSCE) was asked to continue to co-operate with the United Nations in the democratisation process and welcomed the efforts of the Commonwealth of Independent States (CIS) peacekeeping forces in the country.

Finally, the Secretary-General Kofi Annan was requested to keep the Council informed on developments in Tajikistan and to that effect, submit a report within three months. At the beginning of June 1999, UNMOT re-opened its offices in Khorugh and Khujand following the shooting of four of its personnel in July 1998.

== See also ==
- Civil war in Tajikistan
- History of Tajikistan
- List of United Nations Security Council Resolutions 1201 to 1300 (1998–2000)
