= United Nations Security Council Resolution 1278 =

UN Security Council Resolution 1278
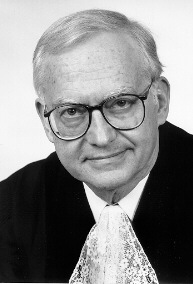
- Stephen Schwebel
- Date: 30 November 1999
- Meeting no.: 4,075
- Code: S/RES/1278 (Document)
- Subject: International Court of Justice
- Result: Adopted

Security Council composition
- Permanent members: China; France; Russia; United Kingdom; United States
- Non-permanent members: Argentina; Bahrain; Brazil; Canada; Gabon; Gambia; Malaysia; Namibia; Netherlands; Slovenia

United Nations Security Council resolution 1278, adopted without a vote on 30 November 1999, after noting the resignation of International Court of Justice (ICJ) judge Stephen M. Schwebel taking effect on 29 February 2000, the council decided that elections to the vacancy on the ICJ would take place on 2 March 2000 at the security council and at a meeting of the General Assembly during its 54th session.

Schwebel, an American jurist, was a member of the court since January 1981, vice-president of the ICJ from 1994 to 1997 and its president since 1997. His term of office was due to expire in February 2006.

== See also ==
- Judges of the International Court of Justice
- List of United Nations Security Council Resolutions 1201 to 1300 (1998–2000)
