= United Nations Security Council Resolution 1215 =

UN Security Council Resolution 1215
- Date: 17 December 1998
- Meeting no.: 3,956
- Code: S/RES/1215 (Document)
- Subject: The situation concerning Western Sahara
- Voting summary: 15 voted for; None voted against; None abstained
- Result: Adopted

Security Council composition
- Permanent members: China; France; Russia; United Kingdom; United States
- Non-permanent members: Bahrain; Brazil; Costa Rica; Gabon; Gambia; Japan; Kenya; Portugal; Slovenia; Sweden

United Nations Security Council resolution 1215, adopted unanimously on 17 December 1998, after reaffirming all previous resolutions on the question of the Western Sahara, in particular Resolution 1204 (1998), the Council extended the mandate of the United Nations Mission for the Referendum in Western Sahara (MINURSO) until 31 January 1999 to allow for further consultations between parties.

The Security Council took note of the Moroccan government's view and that the Polisario Front was to implement measures proposed by the Secretary-General Kofi Annan in his report to further the Settlement Plan. It noted that his proposals to launch simultaneously the identification and appeals processes would demonstrate their willingness to accelerate plans for a referendum.

Both parties were called upon to sign the refugee repatriation protocol with the United Nations High Commissioner for Refugees (UNHCR) and allow the UNHCR to conduct preparatory work for the repatriation of the refugees. Morocco was called upon to conclude a Status of Forces Agreement to facilitate the deployment of MINURSO military units.

The resolution concluded by asking the secretary-general to report to the council by 22 January 1999 on developments in Western Sahara.

== See also ==
- Free Zone (region)
- History of Western Sahara
- List of United Nations Security Council Resolutions 1201 to 1300 (1998–2000)
- Sahrawi Arab Democratic Republic
- Wall (Western Sahara)
