= United Nations Security Council Resolution 1208 =

UN Security Council Resolution 1208
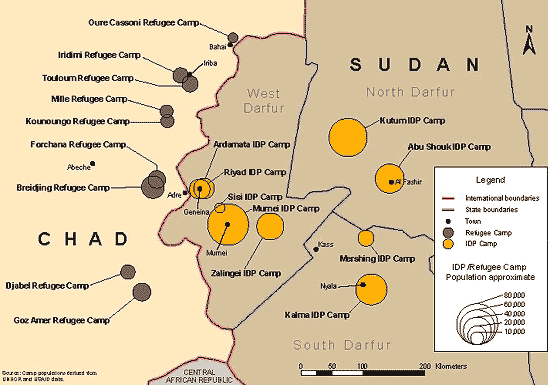
- Refugee camps in and around the Darfur region of Sudan
- Date: 19 November 1998
- Meeting no.: 3,945
- Code: S/RES/1208 (Document)
- Subject: The situation in Africa
- Voting summary: 15 voted for; None voted against; None abstained
- Result: Adopted

Security Council composition
- Permanent members: China; France; Russia; United Kingdom; United States
- Non-permanent members: Bahrain; Brazil; Costa Rica; Gabon; Gambia; Japan; Kenya; Portugal; Slovenia; Sweden

United Nations Security Council resolution 1208, adopted unanimously on 19 November 1998, after recalling Resolution 1170 (1998) on Africa, the Council discussed the treatment and status of refugees on the continent.

It was important that refugees were protected and that the humanitarian character of refugee camps preserved. The Security Council recognised the experience African countries had in dealing with refugees and refugee camps. There was insecurity in some camps due to the presence of armed groups which did not qualify for international protection, differences within the refugee population, crime, banditry, and the flow of weapons. It emphasised the need to assist African countries to provide security for refugees, maintain the humanitarian character of refugee camps and protect vulnerable groups such as women, children and the elderly.

The Security Council stressed the importance of the Convention Relating to the Status of Refugees of 1951 and of particular relevance was the Organisation of African Unity (OAU) Convention Governing the Specific Aspects of Refugee Problems in Africa. The host of a refugee camp was responsible for its security and humanitarian nature. In this regard, the United Nations High Commissioner for Refugees, OAU, the international community and regional and subregional organisations were urged to assist African countries hosting refugee populations while the Secretary-General Kofi Annan had to respond to requests concerning the implementation of human rights and international humanitarian law. Finally, he was also asked to consider the establishment of a new category within the United Nations Trust Fund for Improving Preparedness for Conflict Prevention and Peacekeeping in Africa.

== See also ==
- Great Lakes refugee crisis
- History of Africa
- List of conflicts in Africa
- List of United Nations Security Council Resolutions 1201 to 1300 (1998–2000)
