= United Nations Security Council Resolution 1251 =

UN Security Council Resolution 1251
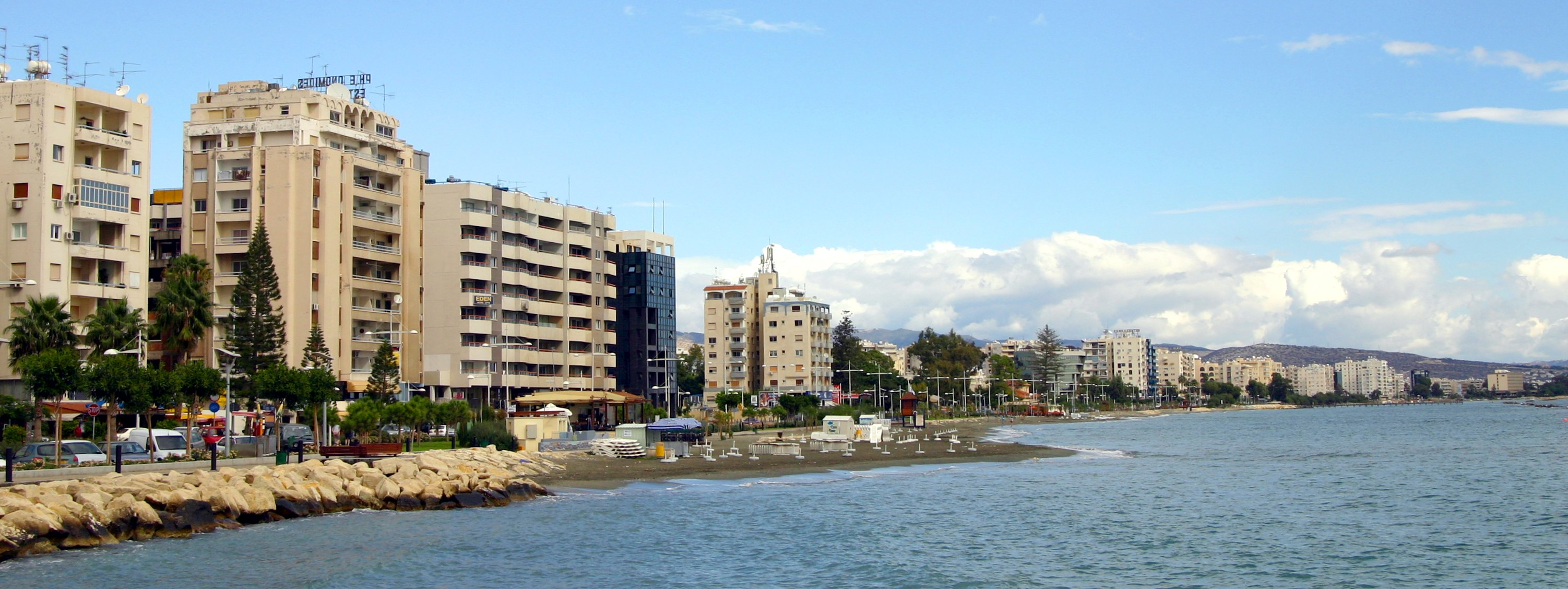
- Limassol in the southern part of Cyprus
- Date: 29 June 1999
- Meeting no.: 4,018
- Code: S/RES/1251 (Document)
- Subject: The situation in Cyprus
- Voting summary: 15 voted for; None voted against; None abstained
- Result: Adopted

Security Council composition
- Permanent members: China; France; Russia; United Kingdom; United States
- Non-permanent members: Argentina; Bahrain; Brazil; Canada; Gabon; Gambia; Malaysia; Namibia; Netherlands; Slovenia

United Nations Security Council resolution 1251, adopted unanimously on 29 June 1999, after reaffirming all past resolutions on the situation in Cyprus, including resolutions 1217 (1998) and 1218 (1998), the Council extended the mandate of the United Nations Peacekeeping Force in Cyprus (UNFICYP) for a further six months until 15 December 1999.

The Government of Cyprus had again agreed to the continued presence of UNFICYP on the island. The situation along the ceasefire line had remained calm apart from minor violations, though there were restrictions upon UNFICYP's freedom of movement.

The mandate of UNFICYP was extended until 15 December 1999 and authorities in Cyprus and Northern Cyprus were reminded to ensure the safety of UNFICYP personnel and end violence against it. Military authorities on both sides were urged to refrain from actions that could exacerbate tensions such as demining along the Buffer Zone. The Greek Cypriot side in particular was called upon to implement the UNFICYP package of measures. There was also concern about the strengthening of military weapons in southern Cyprus and the lack of progress in decreasing the number of foreign troops. In this regard, the Council urged the Republic of Cyprus to cut back on defence spending and withdraw foreign troops, with an overall view to demilitarising the entire island.

The security council welcomed the ongoing efforts of UNFICYP to implement its humanitarian mandate. It also reaffirmed its long-standing position that the Cyprus issue should be resolved on the basis of a single Cyprus with a bi-zonal and bi-communal federation without secession or union with another country.

Finally, the Secretary-General Kofi Annan was requested to report back to the council by 1 December 1999 on the implementation of the current resolution. Resolution 1250 adopted the same day further discussed the peace process on the island.

== See also ==
- Cyprus dispute
- List of United Nations Security Council Resolutions 1201 to 1300 (1998–2000)
- United Nations Buffer Zone in Cyprus
- Turkish Invasion of Cyprus
