= United Nations Security Council Resolution 1263 =

UN Security Council Resolution 1263
- Western Sahara (light green) and the Sahrawi Arab Democratic Republic (dark green)
- Date: 13 September 1999
- Meeting no.: 4,044
- Code: S/RES/1263 (Document)
- Subject: The situation concerning Western Sahara
- Voting summary: 15 voted for; None voted against; None abstained
- Result: Adopted

Security Council composition
- Permanent members: China; France; Russia; United Kingdom; United States
- Non-permanent members: Argentina; Bahrain; Brazil; Canada; Gabon; Gambia; Malaysia; Namibia; Netherlands; Slovenia

United Nations Security Council resolution 1263, adopted unanimously on 13 September 1999, after reaffirming all previous resolutions on the question of the Western Sahara, the Council extended the mandate of the United Nations Mission for the Referendum in Western Sahara (MINURSO) until 14 December 1999.

The resolution began by welcoming the resumption of the identification of voters and commencement of the appeals process. In this regard, it extended MINURSO's mandate in order to complete the voter identification process, implement confidence-building measures, continue the appeals process and conclude outstanding agreements relating to the implementation of the Settlement Plan. At the time of the adoption of the resolution, 22,656 individuals had been pre-registered in El Aaiún and a further 548 individuals in Nouadhibou and Zouérat in northern Mauritania.

The Secretary-General Kofi Annan was requested to report every 45 days on significant developments relating and to submit a comprehensive assessment of steps towards the completion of the appeals process, staffing requirements, refugee repatriation and the beginning of the transitional period.

== See also ==
- Free Zone (region)
- History of Western Sahara
- Political status of Western Sahara
- List of United Nations Security Council Resolutions 1201 to 1300 (1998–2000)
- Sahrawi Arab Democratic Republic
- Moroccan Western Sahara Wall
