= United Nations Security Council Resolution 1212 =

1998 resolution on Haiti

UN Security Council Resolution 1212
- Haiti
- Date: 25 November 1998
- Meeting no.: 3,949
- Code: S/RES/1212 (Document)
- Subject: The question concerning Haiti
- Voting summary: 13 voted for; None voted against; 2 abstained
- Result: Adopted

Security Council composition
- Permanent members: China; France; Russia; United Kingdom; United States
- Non-permanent members: Bahrain; Brazil; Costa Rica; Gabon; Gambia; Japan; Kenya; Portugal; Slovenia; Sweden

United Nations Security Council resolution 1212, adopted on 25 November 1998, after recalling all relevant resolutions on Haiti including Resolution 1141 (1997), the council extended the mandate of the United Nations Civilian Police Mission in Haiti (MIPONUH) for an additional year.

The security council noted that the United Nations Civilian Police, the International Civilian Mission and the United Nations Development Programme had played a key role in Haiti by helping to build a police force and restore democracy and justice. In this regard, it welcomed the continued professionalisation of the Haitian National Police and the progress made towards the "Haitian National Police development plan for 1997–2001". The council stressed the link between peace and development, noting that international assistance is essential for long term peace in the country. There was concern therefore that the political standstill could pose a risk to the peace process.

The importance of a functioning police force was highlighted and the mandate of MIPONUH was extended at the request of the Haitian government. It was not to be extended beyond 30 November 1999 and the secretary-general was requested to report on the mission every three months. Furthermore, continued assistance by the international community, including United Nations Economic and Social Council, was necessary. Finally, Haitian political leaders were urged to negotiate an end to the political crisis and reform the justice system, particularly its prisons.

Resolution 1212 was adopted by 13 votes to none against and two abstentions from China and Russia. China's proposals for an appropriate extension of the mandate were not accepted and Russia was concerned that the United Nations presence in Haiti had been extended several times, noting that it would not enhance the council's authority or confidence in its decisions.

== See also ==
- History of Haiti
- List of United Nations Security Council Resolutions 1201 to 1300 (1998–2000)
- Operation Uphold Democracy
- United Nations Mission in Haiti
