= United Nations Security Council Resolution 1202 =

UN Security Council Resolution 1202
- Flag of Angola
- Date: 15 October 1998
- Meeting no.: 3,936
- Code: S/RES/1202 (Document)
- Subject: The situation in Angola
- Voting summary: 15 voted for; None voted against; None abstained
- Result: Adopted

Security Council composition
- Permanent members: China; France; Russia; United Kingdom; United States
- Non-permanent members: Bahrain; Brazil; Costa Rica; Gabon; Gambia; Japan; Kenya; Portugal; Slovenia; Sweden

United Nations Security Council resolution 1202 was adopted unanimously on 15 October 1998, after reaffirming Resolution 696 (1991) and all subsequent resolutions on Angola, including Resolution 1196 (1998) on Africa. The council extended the mandate of the United Nations Observer Mission in Angola (MONUA) until 3 December 1998.

The security council reaffirmed that the Acordos de Paz, Lusaka Protocol and relevant security council resolutions formed the basis of the peace process in Angola. It called on the international community, especially countries that could have an influence on Jonas Savimbi, the leader of UNITA, to persuade the movement to move towards peace and reconstruction of the country.

The resolution reiterated that the primary cause of the political crisis in Angola was the failure of UNITA to comply with its obligations under peace agreements and Security Council resolutions. Furthermore, it demanded that it complete the demilitarisation of its forces and withdraw from territories it occupied through military means; there could be no military solution to the conflict and both parties were urged to seek a political settlement.

After extending MONUA's mandate, the Council stated that it could be deployed as needed in accordance with the peace process. UNITA was urged to transform itself into a political party and legal authority and human rights had to be respected. The Council highlighted the humanitarian situation in the country, particularly the 1.3 million displaced persons and lack of humanitarian access to vulnerable groups.

In recalling that countries had to comply with resolutions 864 (1993), 1127 (1997) and 1173 (1998), the Security Council requested further investigations into reports that Jonas Savimbi had travelled outside Angola (to Uganda and Togo) and UNITA forces had received illicit arms transfers and military training in violation of the aforementioned resolutions.

Finally, the Council deplored the fatal crash of a Russian passenger jet in Malanje Province and asked Angola to conduct a thorough investigation into the cause of the incident. UNITA was allegedly responsible for shooting down the plane.

== See also ==
- Angolan Civil War
- List of United Nations Security Council Resolutions 1201 to 1300 (1998–2000)
- United Nations Angola Verification Mission I
- United Nations Angola Verification Mission II
- United Nations Angola Verification Mission III
