= United Nations Security Council Resolution 1238 =

UN Security Council Resolution 1238
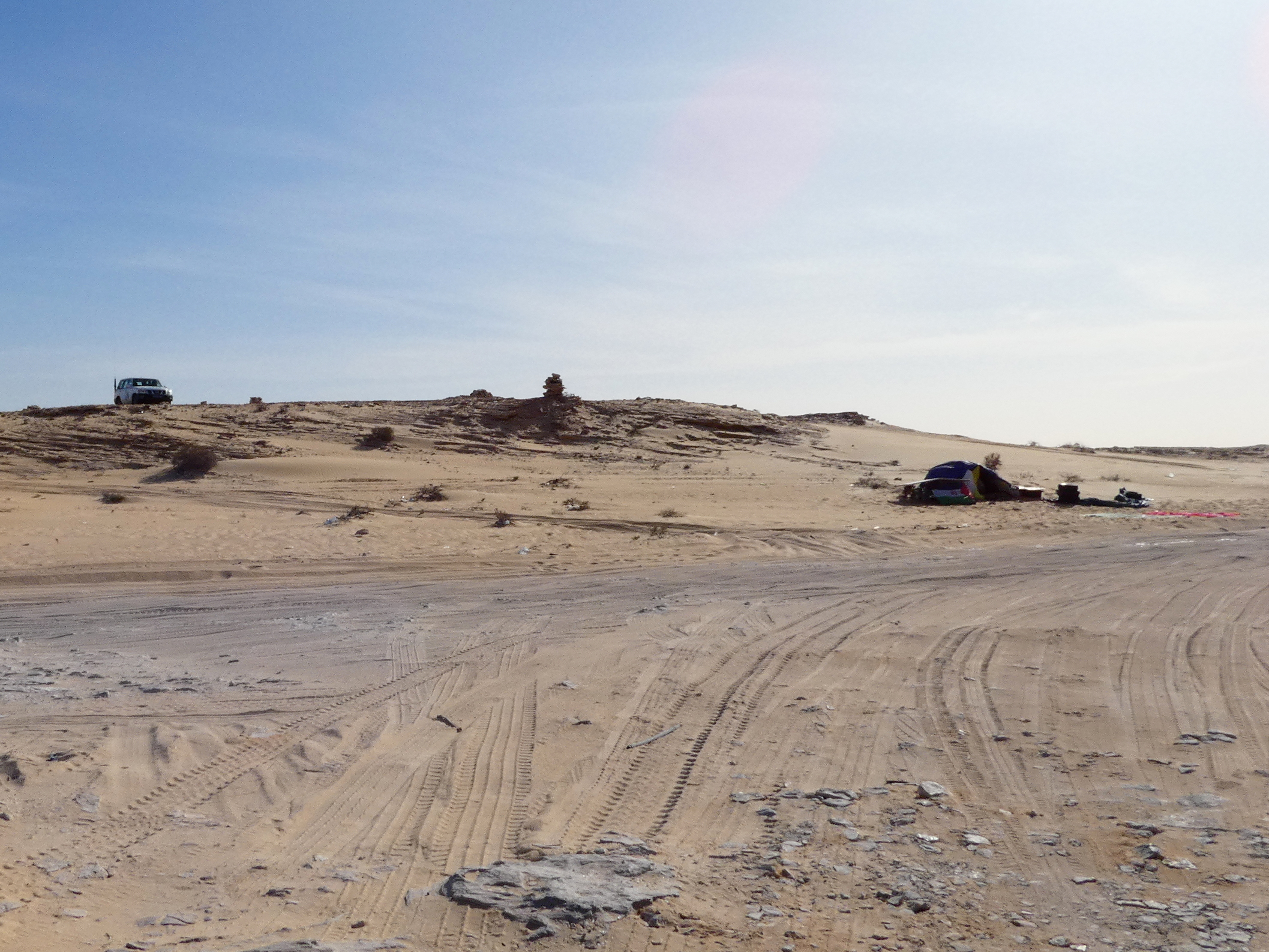
- UN patrol in the Western Sahara
- Date: 14 May 1999
- Meeting no.: 4,002
- Code: S/RES/1238 (Document)
- Subject: The situation concerning Western Sahara
- Voting summary: 15 voted for; None voted against; None abstained
- Result: Adopted

Security Council composition
- Permanent members: China; France; Russia; United Kingdom; United States
- Non-permanent members: Argentina; Bahrain; Brazil; Canada; Gabon; Gambia; Malaysia; Namibia; Netherlands; Slovenia

United Nations Security Council resolution 1238 extended the mandate of the United Nations Mission for the Referendum in Western Sahara (MINURSO) until 14 September 1999. It was adopted unanimously on 14 May 1999, after reaffirming all previous resolutions on the question of the Western Sahara.

The Security Council welcomed the acceptance by the Government of Morocco and the Polisario Front concerning the detailed modalities for the implementation of the Secretary-General Kofi Annan's package of measures relating to voter identification, the appeals process and the revised implementation timetable as part of the Settlement Plan.

MINURSO's mandate was extended to allow for the resumption of the identification process, the beginning of the appeals process and the conclusion of all outstanding agreements relating to the Settlement Plan. The Council supported the increase in staff at the Identification Commission from 25 to 30 members.

The Secretary-General was requested to report every 45 days on developments concerning the Settlement Plan, particularly with regard to the co-operation of both parties relating to voter identification, protocols relating to refugees and confirmation that the United Nations High Commissioner for Refugees (UNHCR) was operational in the region. Additionally, the UNHCR was instructed to provide reports on confidence-building measures and timelines for their implementation.

Finally, the Secretary-General was required to submit a revised timetable for the holding of a referendum on self-determination for the people of Western Sahara and the financial implications, in accordance with the Settlement Plan.

== See also ==
- Free Zone (region)
- History of Western Sahara
- List of United Nations Security Council Resolutions 1201 to 1300 (1998–2000)
- Sahrawi Arab Democratic Republic
- Moroccan Western Sahara Wall
- List of United Nations resolutions concerning Western Sahara
