= United Nations Security Council Resolution 1226 =

UN Security Council Resolution 1226
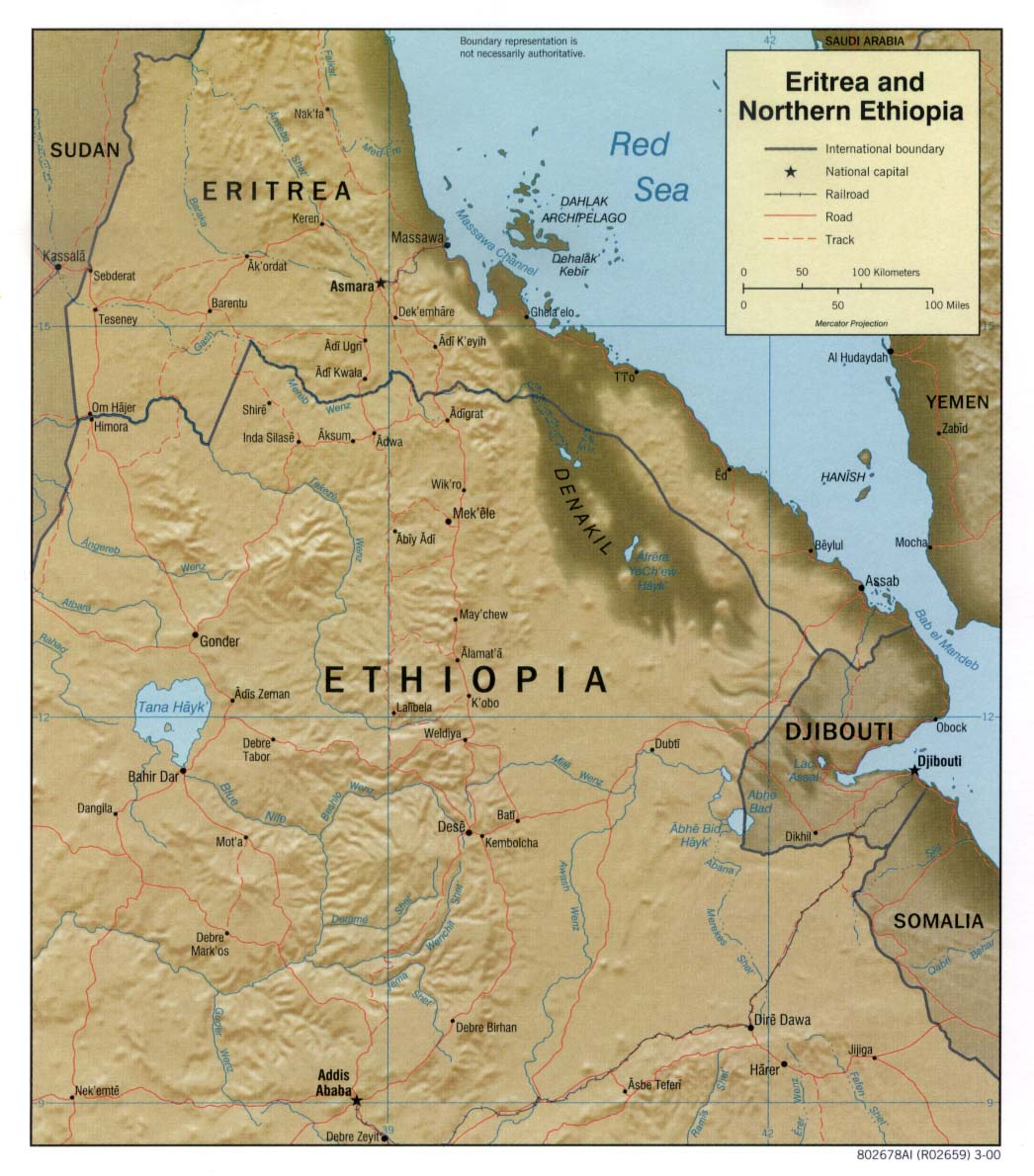
- Eritrea and northern Ethiopia
- Date: 29 January 1999
- Meeting no.: 3,973
- Code: S/RES/1226 (Document)
- Subject: The situation between Eritrea and Ethiopia
- Voting summary: 15 voted for; None voted against; None abstained
- Result: Adopted

Security Council composition
- Permanent members: China; France; Russia; United Kingdom; United States
- Non-permanent members: Argentina; Bahrain; Brazil; Canada; Gabon; Gambia; Malaysia; Namibia; Netherlands; Slovenia

United Nations Security Council resolution 1226, adopted unanimously on 29 January 1999, after reaffirming Resolution 1177 (1998) on the situation between Eritrea and Ethiopia, the Council strongly urged Eritrea to accept an agreement proposed by the Organisation of African Unity (OAU) to resolve the conflict between the two countries.

The security council expressed concern at the risk of armed conflict and the build up of arms along the border between Eritrea and Ethiopia. It noted that such a conflict would have a devastating impact on the populations of both countries and the region as a whole. The rehabilitation and reconstruction efforts of the two countries over the past eight years would be put in jeopardy by armed conflict. Meanwhile, the efforts of certain countries and regional bodies to seek a solution to the conflict were welcomed.

The resolution supported the mediation efforts of the OAU and the decision of the Secretary-General Kofi Annan to send a Special Envoy to support the OAU initiatives. It stressed that importance of the OAU Framework Agreement and welcomed Ethiopia's acceptance. Eritrea had requested further clarification and the OAU had responded, prompting the council to urge Eritrea to accept the agreement.

Both parties were called upon to towards a reduction in tension by adopting measures leading to the restoration of confidence between both sides, improve the humanitarian situation and respect for human rights. Finally, the two countries were urged to seek a peaceful resolution, exercise restraint and refrain from taking military action.

Ethiopia accepted the provisions Resolution 1226, which was rejected by Eritrea. The latter defended its right to seek clarifications and accused the Security Council resolution of being "imbalanced" as it did not refer to human rights violations allegedly committed by Ethiopia.

== See also ==
- Eritrean–Ethiopian War
- List of United Nations Security Council Resolutions 1201 to 1300 (1998–2000)
- United Nations Mission in Ethiopia and Eritrea
