= United Nations Security Council Resolution 1204 =

UN Security Council Resolution 1204
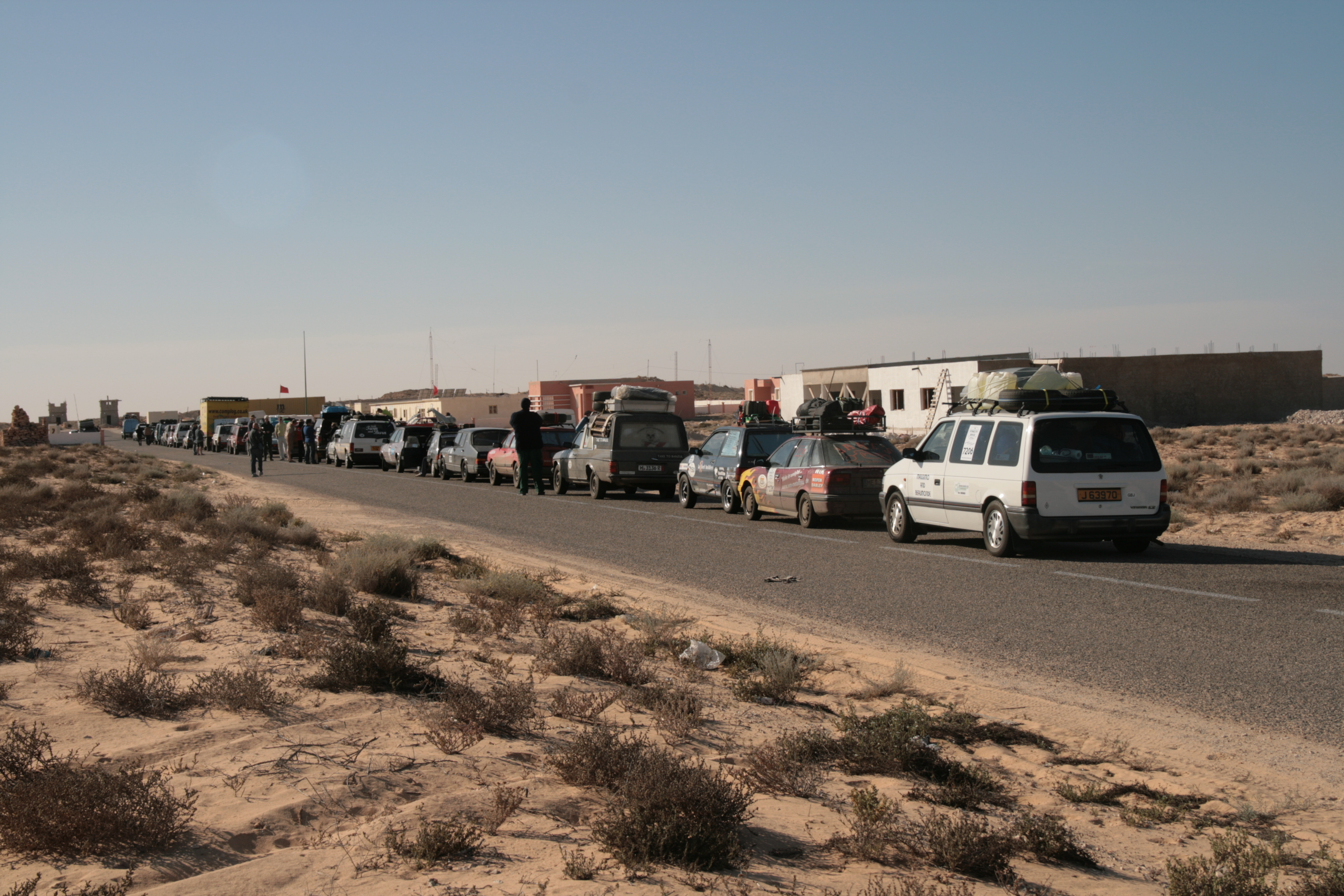
- Border between Western Sahara and Mauritania
- Date: 30 October 1998
- Meeting no.: 3,938
- Code: S/RES/1204 (Document)
- Subject: The situation concerning Western Sahara
- Voting summary: 15 voted for; None voted against; None abstained
- Result: Adopted

Security Council composition
- Permanent members: China; France; Russia; United Kingdom; United States
- Non-permanent members: Bahrain; Brazil; Costa Rica; Gabon; Gambia; Japan; Kenya; Portugal; Slovenia; Sweden

United Nations Security Council resolution 1204, adopted unanimously on 30 October 1998, after reaffirming all previous resolutions on the question of the Western Sahara, the Council extended the mandate of the United Nations Mission for the Referendum in Western Sahara (MINURSO) until 17 December 1998.

The Security Council reiterated its commitment to finding a lasting solution to the conflict in Western Sahara and its determination to hold a referendum on self-determination for the people of the territory in accordance with the Settlement Plan which both Morocco and the Polisario Front had accepted.

Both parties were requested to allow the United Nations High Commissioner for Refugees (UNHCR) to conduct preparatory work for the repatriation of Saharan refugees eligible to vote. Additionally they were asked to agree to a package of measures concerning the appeals process, the role of the UNHCR and the future stages of the Settlement Plan by mid-November 1998. The resolution regretted that the technical support unit was still not fully operational and called for the conclusion of a Status of Forces Agreement which would facilitate the deployment of military units in Western Sahara. It supported the intention of MINURSO to publish the voter lists by 1 December 1998 and an increase in staff at the Identification Commission from 18 to 25 as well as necessary support personnel.

== See also ==
- Free Zone (region)
- History of Western Sahara
- List of United Nations Security Council Resolutions 1201 to 1300 (1998–2000)
- Sahrawi Arab Democratic Republic
- Moroccan Western Sahara Wall
