= United Nations Security Council Resolution 1218 =

UN Security Council Resolution 1218
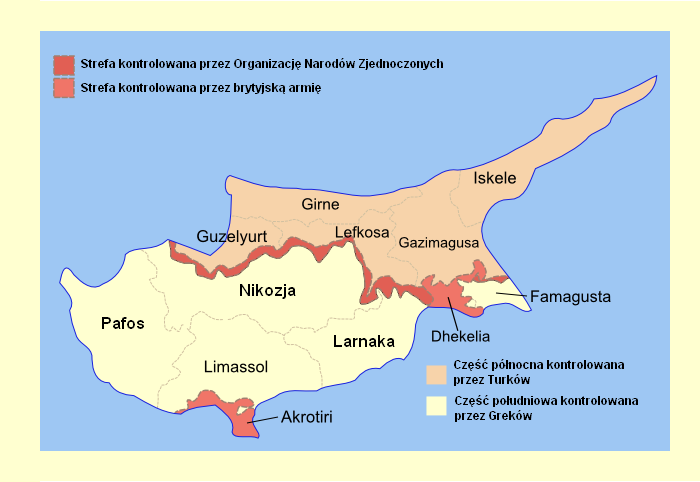
- Divided Cyprus
- Date: 22 December 1998
- Meeting no.: 3,959
- Code: S/RES/1218 (Document)
- Subject: The situation in Cyprus
- Voting summary: 15 voted for; None voted against; None abstained
- Result: Adopted

Security Council composition
- Permanent members: China; France; Russia; United Kingdom; United States
- Non-permanent members: Bahrain; Brazil; Costa Rica; Gabon; Gambia; Japan; Kenya; Portugal; Slovenia; Sweden

United Nations Security Council resolution 1218, adopted unanimously on 22 December 1998, after reaffirming all resolutions on the situation in Cyprus, the Council addressed the peace process surrounding the Cyprus dispute and called upon both parties to co-operate with the Secretary-General.

The Security Council expressed concern at the lack of progress towards an overall political settlement in Cyprus. It endorsed the initiative of the Secretary-General Kofi Annan to reduce tension promote progress on the island between the Republic of Cyprus and Northern Cyprus, and commended both sides for their constructive efforts. The Secretary-General was urged to continue the objectives taking into account Resolution 1178 (1998), and to work intensively on the following issues:

(a) Refraining from threats or use of violence;
(b) To limit and reduce the presence of foreign troops on the island;
(c) Implementing proposals recommended by the United Nations Peacekeeping Force in Cyprus to reduce tensions along the Buffer Zone;
(d) Further progress in reducing tension;
(e) Making progress on substantive issues;
(f) Other measures to build co-operation and trust.

Both parties were urged to comply with the aforementioned issues and the Secretary-General was requested to keep the Council updated on progress.

== See also ==
- Annan Plan for Cyprus
- Cyprus problem
- List of United Nations Security Council Resolutions 1201 to 1300 (1998–2000)
- Turkish invasion of Cyprus
