= United Nations Security Council Resolution 1177 =

UN Security Council Resolution 1177
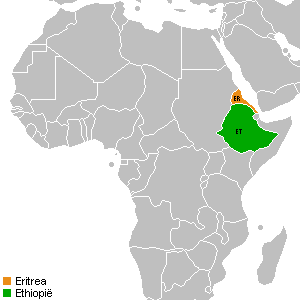
- Eritrea (orange) and Ethiopia (green)
- Date: 26 June 1998
- Meeting no.: 3,895
- Code: S/RES/1177 (Document)
- Subject: The situation between Eritrea and Ethiopia
- Voting summary: 15 voted for; None voted against; None abstained
- Result: Adopted

Security Council composition
- Permanent members: China; France; Russia; United Kingdom; United States
- Non-permanent members: Bahrain; Brazil; Costa Rica; Gabon; Gambia; Japan; Kenya; Portugal; Slovenia; Sweden

United Nations Security Council resolution 1177, adopted unanimously on 26 June 1998, after recognising the deteriorating situation between Eritrea and Ethiopia, the Council condemned the outbreak of war and demanded an immediate ceasefire in their border dispute.

There was serious concern about the consequences of the conflict between Ethiopia and Eritrea, with the Council affirming that disputes should be settled in a peaceful manner and the use of armed force was unacceptable. It noted pledges by the Government of Ethiopia and Government of Eritrea to end air strikes and of their goal to demarcate and delimit their border in a mutually agreeable way.

The Security Council condemned the use of force and demanded that both sides ceased hostilities with immediate effect. It called for a peaceful settlement of the conflict in co-operation with the Organisation of African Unity (OAU). The parties were also asked to refrain from actions that would escalate the situation and to adopt measures that would boost confidence between the two sides including the guaranteeing of the rights and safety of each other's nationals. The Secretary-General Kofi Annan was directed to establish a Trust Fund and to provide technical assistance in the process of both parties demarcating their common border.

Both parties welcomed the resolution; Eritrea said that for the first time the concerns of both countries were being addressed, while Ethiopia was aware that its adoption appeared to reinforce a demand by Rwanda, the United States and OAU that Eritrea withdraw to territory it occupied before the outbreak of the conflict.

== See also ==
- Eritrean–Ethiopian War
- List of United Nations Security Council Resolutions 1101 to 1200 (1997–1998)
- United Nations Mission in Ethiopia and Eritrea
