= United Nations Security Council Resolution 1478 =

UN Security Council Resolution 1478
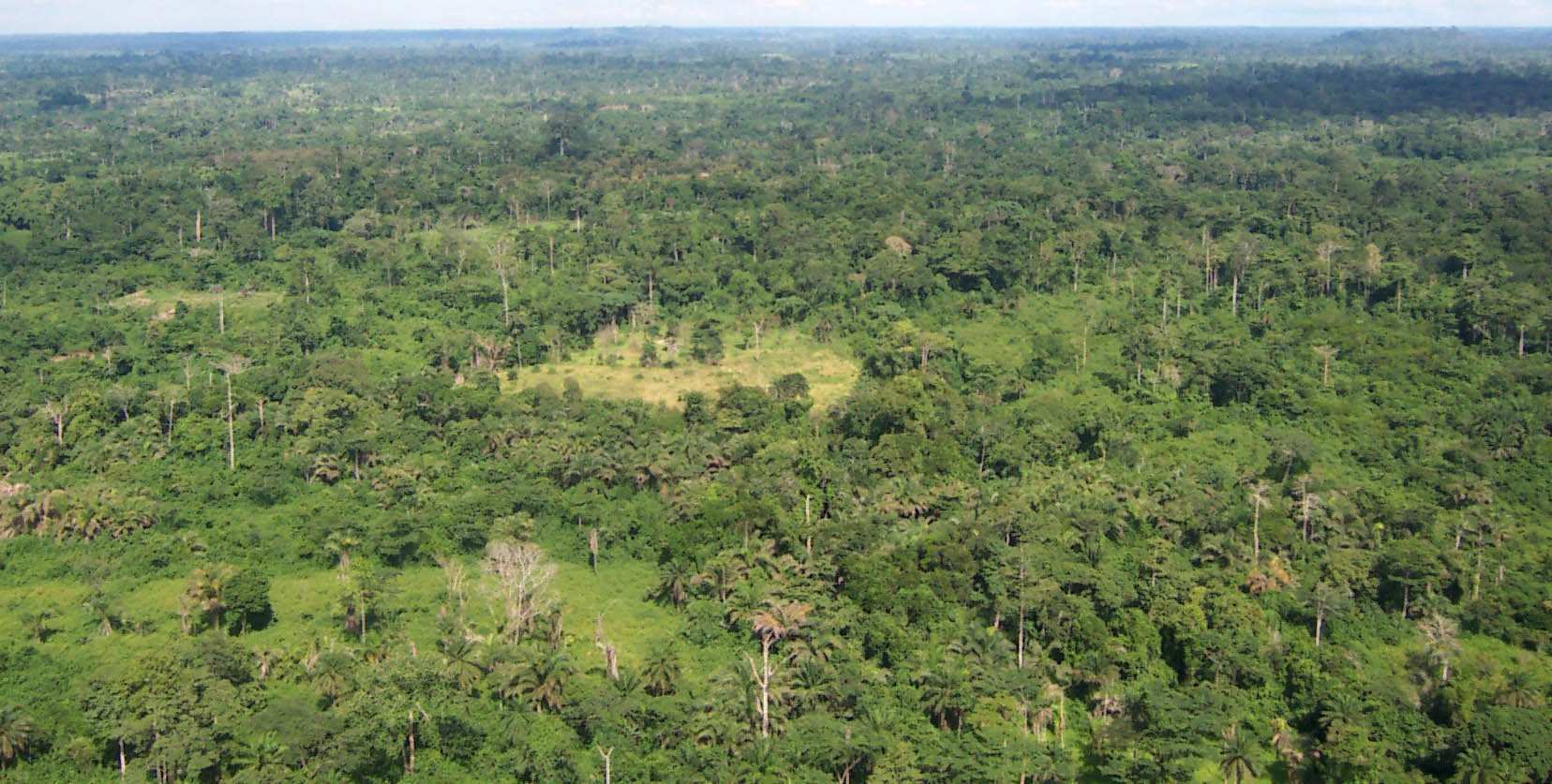
- Liberian forest
- Date: 6 May 2003
- Meeting no.: 4,751
- Code: S/RES/1478 (Document)
- Subject: The situation in Liberia
- Voting summary: 15 voted for; None voted against; None abstained
- Result: Adopted

Security Council composition
- Permanent members: China; France; Russia; United Kingdom; United States
- Non-permanent members: Angola; Bulgaria; Chile; Cameroon; Germany; Guinea; Mexico; Pakistan; Spain; Syria

United Nations Security Council resolution 1478, adopted unanimously on 6 May 2003, after recalling resolutions 1132 (1997), 1171 (1998), 1306 (2000), 1343 (2001), 1385 (2001), 1395 (2002), 1400 (2002), 1408 (2002), 1458 (2003), 1467 (2003) and others on the situation in Liberia, the Council extended sanctions against the Liberian government for an additional period of twelve months until 7 May 2004 and imposed a ban on imports of its timber for ten months.

Liberian President Charles Taylor had previously announced he would import weapons in defiance of Security Council resolutions.

== Resolution ==
=== Observations ===
The Security Council expressed concern at the findings of the investigative panel about the Liberian government, the Guinean-backed Liberians United for Reconciliation and Democracy (LURD) and other armed groups concerning breaches of Resolution 1343. It welcomed the launch of the Kimberley Process Certification Scheme on 1 January 2003 and the efforts of the Economic Community of West African States (ECOWAS) and International Contact Group on Liberia to bring about peace and stability in the region, particularly the appointment of Nigerian President Atiku Abubakar as mediator in Liberia. Furthermore, the Council noted positive progress the Rabat Process had made in the subregion and urged members of the Mano River Union to reinvigorate the process, while civil society initiatives were also encouraged.

The preamble of the resolution additionally urged all states in the region, particularly Liberia, to co-operate with the Special Court for Sierra Leone. It remained concerned at the humanitarian situation, violations of human rights and serious instability in Liberia and Côte d'Ivoire. Support offered by the Liberian government to rebels in the civil war in Côte d'Ivoire and to the Revolutionary United Front rebels in Sierra Leone was determined to constitute a threat to international peace and security in the region.

=== Acts ===
Acting under Chapter VII of the United Nations Charter, the Council decided that the Liberian government had not complied with Resolution 1343, and was concerned that a new aircraft registry remained inactive. It stressed that demands to comply with Resolution 1343 were to help build peace and security in Sierra Leone and the region. All states in the region were called upon to participate in regional peace initiatives, while Liberia and the LURD were urged to enter into bilateral negotiations aimed at finalising a ceasefire. Exemptions to the travel ban imposed on Liberian officials would be granted in cases where such travel would assist in the resolution of conflict in the region. Both the Liberian government and LURD were called upon to allow unimpeded and safe access to United Nations humanitarian personnel and those of non-governmental organisations and to end the use of child soldiers, sexual violence and torture. Additionally, all states in the region were asked to refrain from supporting armed groups in nearby countries, and in the event of non-compliance, further measures would be considered to ensure compliance.

The resolution extended existing international sanctions against Liberia for another year and would be extended or terminated if necessary. The Liberian government was asked to establish a certificate of origin regime for rough diamonds, while it was reaffirmed that diamonds controlled by the government would be exempt from previous restrictions. Considering that audits commissioned by the Liberian government did not demonstrate revenue from the Liberia Ship and Corporate Registry and timber industry was used for legitimate purposes, the Council imposed a ban on imports of Liberian timber for ten months. The ban would come into force on 7 July 2003 unless decided otherwise and would be reviewed before the end of the period. The socio-economic impact of the sanctions would also be considered by 7 September 2003.

The Secretary-General Kofi Annan was requested to submit reports on the socio-economic implications of the sanctions and, along with ECOWAS, on compliance of the Liberian government with the Security Council's demands and their implementation. States in the region were called upon to strengthen measures against the proliferation of small arms, light weapons and mercenary activities. Furthermore, the secretary-general was requested to an expert panel consisting of six members to conduct a follow-up mission to Liberia and neighbouring states on the Liberian government's compliance; investigate the illegal use of revenues; assess the socio-economic impact of the sanctions; and report with observations and recommendations to the council by 7 October 2003.

The Security Council urged states to comply in the implementation of previous resolutions and impose a travel ban on LURD members. A list of maritime and air companies acting in violation of Resolution 1343 would be listed and ECOWAS states were requested to assist in the identification of such aircraft and vessels. A review of the measures would be conducted before 7 November 2003 and every six months thereafter.

== See also ==
- Blood diamonds
- Ivorian Civil War
- List of United Nations Security Council Resolutions 1401 to 1500 (2002–2003)
- Second Liberian Civil War
- Sierra Leone Civil War
