= United Nations Security Council Resolution 1446 =

UN Security Council Resolution 1446
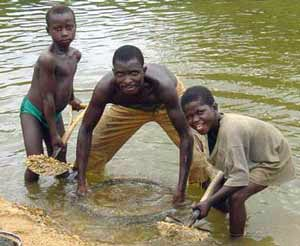
- Diamond miners in Sierra Leone
- Date: 4 December 2002
- Meeting no.: 4,654
- Code: S/RES/1446 (Document)
- Subject: The situation in Sierra Leone
- Voting summary: 15 voted for; None voted against; None abstained
- Result: Adopted

Security Council composition
- Permanent members: China; France; Russia; United Kingdom; United States
- Non-permanent members: Bulgaria; Cameroon; Colombia; Guinea; Ireland; Mauritius; Mexico; Norway; Singapore; Syria

United Nations Security Council resolution 1446, adopted unanimously on 4 December 2002, after recalling all previous resolutions on the situation in Sierra Leone, particularly resolutions 1132 (1997), 1171 (1998), 1299 (2000), 1306 (2000) and 1385 (2001), the Council extended prohibitions relating to the import of rough diamonds not under the control of the Sierra Leonean government until 5 June 2003.

The Security Council began by welcoming the end of the civil war in the country and significant progress in the peace process and security situation. It urged the government to extend its authority throughout the country, including the diamond-producing areas. The Council noted that the illicit trade in diamonds had fuelled the conflict in Sierra Leone and welcomed international efforts to combat the link between the illegal trade in diamonds and armed conflict, particularly by the World Diamond Council.

Acting under Chapter VII of the United Nations Charter, the resolution extended restrictions against the import of diamonds from Sierra Leone not controlled by a certificate of origin regime until 5 June 2003, though they would be terminated if appropriate. It welcomed a report indicating that the regime was helping to curb the illicit trade in diamonds. The Secretary-General Kofi Annan was called upon to publicise the provisions and obligations of the current resolution.

== See also ==
- Blood diamonds
- List of United Nations Security Council Resolutions 1401 to 1500 (2002–2003)
- Sierra Leone Civil War
- Special Court for Sierra Leone
