= United Nations Security Council Resolution 1459 =

UN Security Council Resolution 1459
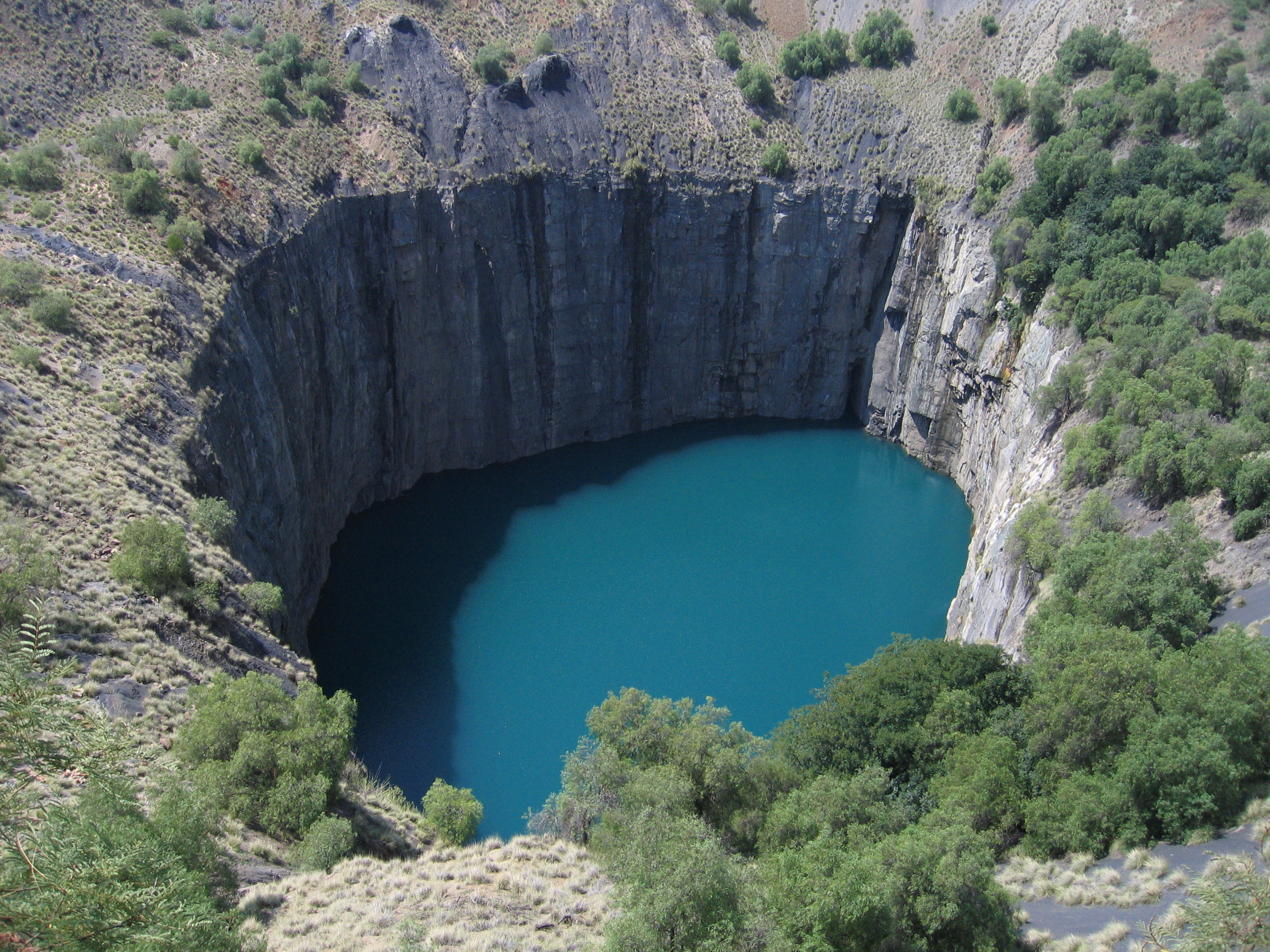
- The Kimberley Mine or "Big Hole" in Kimberley, South Africa
- Date: 28 January 2003
- Meeting no.: 4,694
- Code: S/RES/1459 (Document)
- Subject: The Kimberley Process Certification Scheme
- Voting summary: 15 voted for; None voted against; None abstained
- Result: Adopted

Security Council composition
- Permanent members: China; France; Russia; United Kingdom; United States
- Non-permanent members: Angola; Bulgaria; Chile; Cameroon; Germany; Guinea; Mexico; Pakistan; Spain; Syria

United Nations Security Council resolution 1459, adopted unanimously on 28 January 2003, after recalling resolutions 1173 (1998), 1295 (2000), 1306 (2000), 1343 (2001), 1385 (2001) and 1408 (2002) concerning the illicit trade in diamonds, the Council expressed support for the Kimberley Process Certification Scheme (KPCS).

In the preamble of the resolution, the Security Council remained concerned at the connection between the illegal trade in rough diamonds and the fuelling of armed conflicts. It highlighted the importance of conflict prevention and major diamond producing, trading and processing countries participating in the Kimberley Process. Furthermore, the contributions of industry and civil society to the development of the Scheme were appreciated.

The resolution expressed support for the Kimberley Process Certification Scheme and ongoing efforts to implement and refine the regime as an important contribution against the trafficking of blood diamonds. It also welcomed the voluntary self-regulation system and stressed that the widest possible participation in the Scheme was essential.

== See also ==
- De Beers
- List of United Nations Security Council Resolutions 1401 to 1500 (2002–2003)
