= United Nations Security Council Resolution 1408 =

UN Security Council Resolution 1408
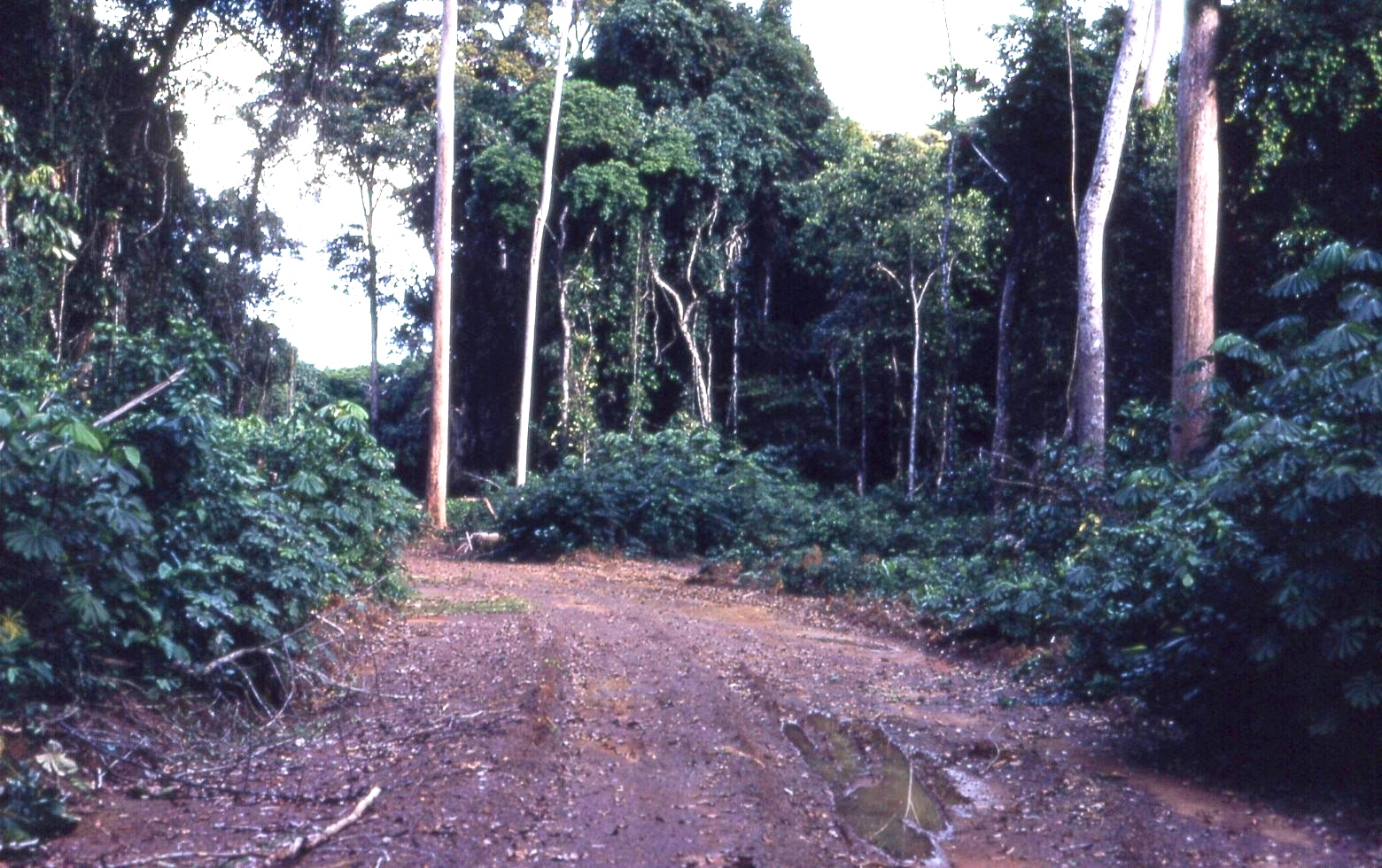
- Logging area in Liberia
- Date: 6 May 2002
- Meeting no.: 4,526
- Code: S/RES/1408 (Document)
- Subject: The situation in Liberia
- Voting summary: 15 voted for; None voted against; None abstained
- Result: Adopted

Security Council composition
- Permanent members: China; France; Russia; United Kingdom; United States
- Non-permanent members: Bulgaria; Cameroon; Colombia; Guinea; Ireland; Mauritius; Mexico; Norway; Singapore; Syria

United Nations Security Council resolution 1408, adopted unanimously on 6 May 2002, after recalling resolutions 1132 (1997), 1171 (1998), 1306 (2000), 1343 (2001), 1385 (2001), 1395 (2002) and 1400 (2002) on the situation in Sierra Leone, the council extended sanctions against Liberia for its support of rebels in the civil war in Sierra Leone.

== Resolution ==
=== Observations ===
The expert panel monitoring compliance of the Liberian government with sanctions had presented its report, and the council was concerned that Liberia continued to violate measures from Resolution 1343 particularly through the acquisition of weapons. It anticipated the full implementation of the Kimberley Process Certification Scheme and diplomatic efforts to restore peace and stability in the region. The council determined that the continued support of the Revolutionary United Front (RUF) combatants in Sierra Leone and the region by the Liberian government constituted a threat to peace and security.

=== Acts ===
Acting under Chapter VII of the United Nations Charter, the security council decided that Liberia had not met the requirements of Resolution 1343 which were designed to consolidate and further the peace process in Sierra Leone and Mano River Union. However, the country had met the requirement to update its aircraft registry. All countries in the region were urged to end their support of and prevent armed groups from destabilising the situation on the borders between Guinea, Liberia and Sierra Leone.

The resolution extended sanctions relating to rough diamonds and travel against Liberia for a further 12 months beginning at 00.01 EST on 7 May 2002 and a review would take place at the end of the period on whether the Liberian government had complied. Furthermore, it was called upon to set up an effective, transparent and verifiable certificate of origin regime, taking into account the international Kimberley Process Certification Scheme. Rough diamonds under the control of the Liberian government would be exempt from the embargo.

The Liberian government was also requested to establish transparent and verifiable audits to ensure that revenue generated from the Liberian Shipping Registry and timber industry is used for legitimate purposes and not in violation of the current resolution. The Secretary-General Kofi Annan was instructed to report by 21 October 2002 on the implementation of the current resolution while a security council committee was asked to investigate violations of Resolution 788 (1992) when it was in effect.

The secretary-general was requested to establish a panel of up to five experts for a period of three months to investigate violations of sanctions and their possible impact on the Liberian population. Any information gathered by the panel was to be brought to the attention of the states concerned. All states were urged to fully comply with the embargoes and exercise caution in weapons transactions to prevent the illegal diversion of weapons to illegal markets in the region.

Finally, the council declared that a review of the sanctions would take place before 7 November 2002 and every six months thereafter.

== See also ==
- Blood diamonds
- List of United Nations Security Council Resolutions 1401 to 1500 (2002–2003)
- Sierra Leone Civil War
- Special Court for Sierra Leone
