= United Nations Security Council Resolution 1521 =

UN Security Council Resolution 1521
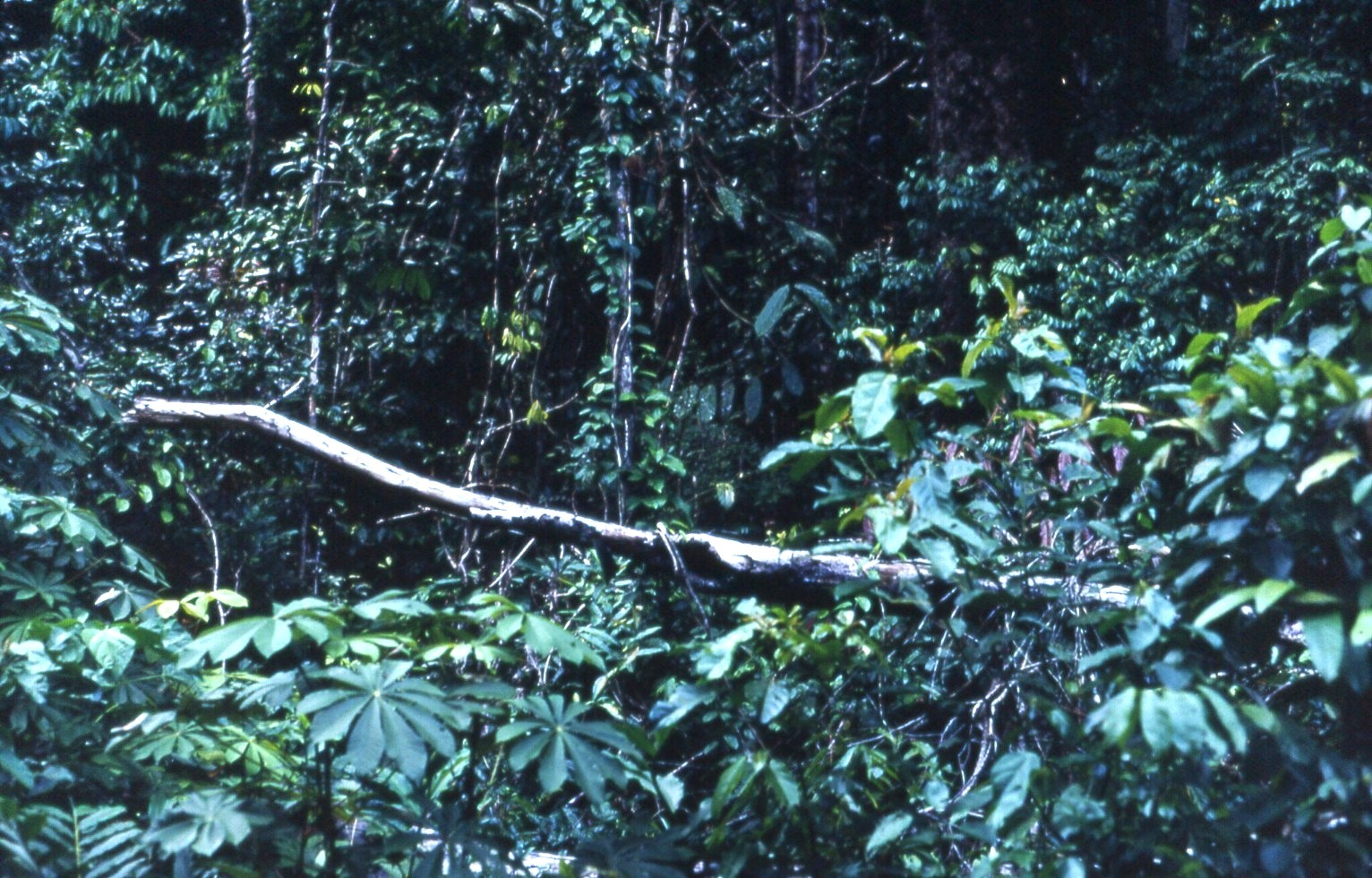
- Liberian rainforest near a logging area
- Date: 22 December 2003
- Meeting no.: 4,890
- Code: S/RES/1521 (Document)
- Subject: The situation in Liberia
- Voting summary: 15 voted for; None voted against; None abstained
- Result: Adopted

Security Council composition
- Permanent members: China; France; Russia; United Kingdom; United States
- Non-permanent members: Angola; Bulgaria; Chile; Cameroon; Germany; Guinea; Mexico; Pakistan; Spain; Syria

United Nations Security Council resolution 1521, adopted unanimously on 22 December 2003, after recalling all previous resolutions on the situation in Liberia and West Africa, the council established a monitoring body to oversee international sanctions against Liberia. It was the final Security Council resolution adopted in 2003.

== Resolution ==
=== Observations ===
In the preamble of the resolution, the council expressed concern at the findings of an expert panel that violations of sanctions imposed by Resolution 1343 (2001) continue to occur. It welcomed a peace agreement signed by the Liberian government, Liberians United for Reconciliation and Democracy (LURD) and the Movement for Democracy in Liberia (MODEL) on 18 August 2003 and that the National Transitional Government of Liberia under Chairman Gyude Bryant took office on 14 October 2003. States in the region were called upon to build lasting peace through the Economic Community of West African States (ECOWAS), International Contact Group on Liberia, Mano River Union and Rabat Process.

Furthermore, there was concern that the peace agreement was not being implemented throughout the entirety of Liberia, especially in areas where the United Nations Mission in Liberia (UNMIL) had not been deployed. The council recognised the connection between the illegal exploitation and trade of natural resources and the proliferation of arms trafficking fuelling conflicts in West Africa. It determined that the situation, proliferation of arms and armed non-state actors including mercenaries in the region continued to constitute a threat to international peace and security.

=== Acts ===
The resolution was divided into two sections, both enacted under Chapter VII of the United Nations Charter thus making its provisions legally enforceable.

==== A ====
The Security Council recalled resolutions 1343, 1408 (2002), 1478 (2003), 1497 (2003) and 1509 (2003), and noted changed circumstances including the departure of former President Charles Taylor and progress with the peace process in Sierra Leone. In this regard, the previous Committee was dissolved and prohibitions on the sale or supply of arms, diamonds, timber and travel were terminated.

==== B ====
At the same time, the restrictions were reimposed for a period of twelve months and relevant exemptions were made relating to the United Nations. The measures would end once the council determined that the Liberian ceasefire was fully respected; disarmament, demobilisation, reintegration, repatriation and restructuring of the security sector have been completed; the peace agreement implemented; a diamond certificate of origin regime established and stability maintained in Liberia and the subregion. The transitional government was also urged to join the Kimberley Process and establish its authority over the timber producing areas, including through oversight mechanisms, as soon as possible. The international community was urged to provide assistance to the transitional government during these processes. The measures would be reviewed by 17 June 2004.

The resolution established a new Committee of the Security Council to monitor the implementation of the sanctions, update a list of sanctioned individuals and entities and make recommendations. Meanwhile, the Secretary-General Kofi Annan was requested to establish a panel of five experts to conduct a follow-up mission to Liberia and neighbouring states concerning the implementation and violations of the restrictions against Liberia, including rebel movements; it had to report by 30 May 2004. It welcomed UNMIL's readiness to co-operate with the committee and requested the United Nations Mission in Sierra Leone and United Nations Mission in Côte d'Ivoire to assist the committee and expert panel. The Secretary-General was directed to report by 30 May 2004 on progress made with regard to the implementation of the measures.

Finally, the transitional government was urged to inform the Liberian population as to the contents of the current resolution, including the criteria for the removal of sanctions.

== See also ==
- List of United Nations Security Council Resolutions 1501 to 1600 (2003–2005)
- Second Liberian Civil War
