= United Nations Security Council Resolution 1176 =

UN Security Council Resolution 1176
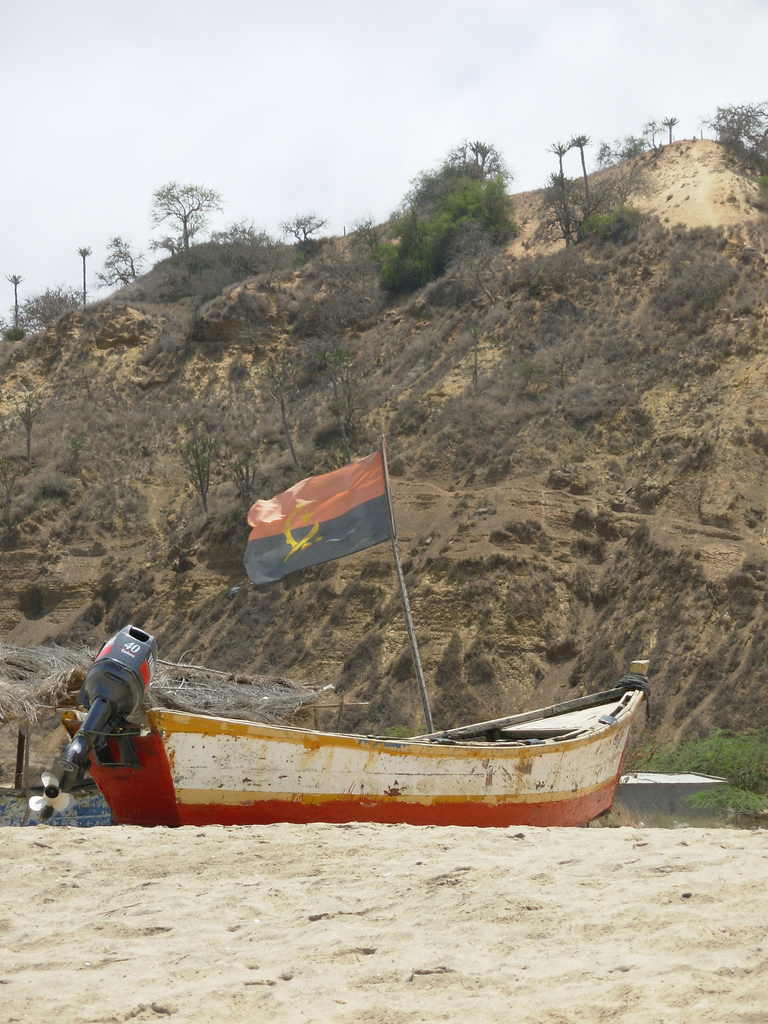
- Fishing boat in Bengo province
- Date: 24 June 1998
- Meeting no.: 3,894
- Code: S/RES/1176 (Document)
- Subject: The situation in Angola
- Voting summary: 15 voted for; None voted against; None abstained
- Result: Adopted

Security Council composition
- Permanent members: China; France; Russia; United Kingdom; United States
- Non-permanent members: Bahrain; Brazil; Costa Rica; Gabon; Gambia; Japan; Kenya; Portugal; Slovenia; Sweden

United Nations Security Council resolution 1176, adopted unanimously on 24 June 1998, after reaffirming Resolution 696 (1991) and all subsequent resolutions on Angola, particularly Resolution 1173 (1998), the Council suspended its intention to impose further sanctions against UNITA for non-compliance until 1 July 1998.

Acting under Chapter VII of the United Nations Charter, the security council demanded UNITA comply unconditionally with its obligations and decided that the restrictions would come into force at 00:01 EST on 1 July 1998, unless the council and secretary-general decided otherwise. The committee established in Resolution 864 (1993) was to report by 7 August 1998 on how countries had implemented the measures specified in Resolution 1173. In a similar manner, countries were asked to report on the measures they had taken to enforce the sanctions by 22 July 1998.

== See also ==
- Angolan Civil War
- Blood diamond
- De Beers
- Kimberley Process Certification Scheme
- List of United Nations Security Council Resolutions 1101 to 1200 (1997–1998)
- United Nations Security Council Resolution 1295
