= Fowler Report =

2000 United Nations report on the diamond trade

The Fowler Report, released on March 14, 2000, is a United Nations report that described the actions undertaken to support the illicit diamond trade by European companies like De Beers, African and European governments, in particular it singled out the diamond industry in Antwerp, Belgium, including that of Angola and the political wing of UNITA, violated the Lusaka Protocol as well as UN-imposed sanctions. Robert Fowler, Canada's ambassador to the United Nations, headed the commission that compiled the report, which raised widespread international concern by highlighting the strong link between the illicit diamond trade and third world conflicts.

== UN sanctions ==
Following the resumption of the Angolan civil war by UNITA, the United Nations Security Council passed Resolution 1173 and Resolution 1176 in 1998, which sought to bring an end to the conflict by imposing sanctions against the UNITA movement, specifically targeting its ability to finance the war through the sale of blood diamonds.

== Sanctions-breaking diamond trade ==
Despite the sanctions imposed against UNITA, the organisation was able to continue financing the conflict; the UN therefore passed United Nations Security Council Resolution 1237, which gave Robert Fowler's panel of experts a mandate to investigate how the sanctions were being circumvented. According to the Fowler Report, UNITA used a number of channels to sell or barter diamonds for cash or weapons. In one of the schemes that was identified, Joe de Deker, a former stockholder in De Beers, worked with the government of Zaire to supply military equipment to UNITA from 1993 to 1997. De Deker's brother, Ronnie, was an arms dealer who allegedly travelled with him from South Africa to Angola, directing weapons originating in Eastern Europe. In return, UNITA gave Ronnie bushels of diamonds worth US$6 million. De Deker sent the diamonds to De Beer's buying office in Antwerp, Belgium. De Beers openly acknowledges spending $500 million on legal and illegal Angolan diamonds in 1992 alone. The United Nations estimates Angolans made between three and four billion dollars through the diamond trade between 1992 and 1998. The UN also estimates that out of that sum, UNITA made at least $3.72 billion, or 93% of all diamond sales, despite international sanctions.

=== Support for UNITA ===
Togolese President Gnassingbé Eyadéma allowed UNITA to use Togo as a base of operations. He gave money to relatives of Jonas Savimbi and shipped arms to UNITA militants. The report condemned Burkinabé President Blaise Compaoré for sending fuel to UNITA and maintaining a stronger alliance with UNITA than all other African leaders. The Rwandan and Gabonese governments refueled UNITA airplanes and sent fuel to Angola. The governments of South Africa, Zambia, Côte d'Ivoire, Morocco and Belgium did not enforce the UN-travel ban on UNITA officials while France, Portugal, Germany, Switzerland, and the United States allowed UNITA to maintain offices in their respective countries.

== Impact ==
The UN had no powers to enforce compliance with the sanctions, so the report instead set out to name and shame the countries, companies and individuals involved, and thereby led directly to the passing of United Nations Security Council Resolution 1295 and the subsequent establishment of the Kimberley Process Certification Scheme.

== See also ==
- United Nations Security Council Resolution 864
