= United Nations Security Council Resolution 1458 =

UN Security Council Resolution 1458
- Liberia
- Date: 28 January 2003
- Meeting no.: 4,693
- Code: S/RES/1457 (Document)
- Subject: The situation in Liberia
- Voting summary: 15 voted for; None voted against; None abstained
- Result: Adopted

Security Council composition
- Permanent members: China; France; Russia; United Kingdom; United States
- Non-permanent members: Angola; Bulgaria; Chile; Cameroon; Germany; Guinea; Mexico; Pakistan; Spain; Syria

United Nations Security Council resolution 1458, adopted unanimously on 28 January 2003, after reaffirming Resolution 1408 (2002) on the situation in Liberia, and recognising the importance of implementing Resolution 1343 (2001), the Council re-established an expert panel to monitor the implementation of sanctions against the Liberian government including an arms embargo, travel ban for officials, and prohibitions on the import of its rough diamonds.

The Security Council noted that a review of measures against the Liberian government was due to take place by 6 May 2003. Additionally, there was also concern at the situation in Liberia and in neighbouring countries, particularly Côte d'Ivoire (Ivory Coast). It noted a previous report by an expert panel concern restrictions against Liberia and intended to give full consideration to the report.

The resolution re-established the expert panel for a period of three months to conduct a follow-up assessment on Liberia and nearby states, in order to ascertain compliance by the Liberian government with measures contained in Resolution 1343 and any violations of Resolution 1408, including the movement of rebels in Sierra Leone. Any information collected by the panel was to be brought to the attention of states concerned. The Secretary-General Kofi Annan was requested to appoint a panel of up to five experts with expertise in order to fulfil the panel's mandate.

Finally, all countries and organisations were urged to co-operate with the expert panel and Committee of the Security Council established in Resolution 1343.

== See also ==
- Blood diamonds
- Ivorian Civil War
- List of United Nations Security Council Resolutions 1401 to 1500 (2002–2003)
- Second Liberian Civil War
- Sierra Leone Civil War
