= United Nations Security Council Resolution 1385 =

UN Security Council Resolution 1385
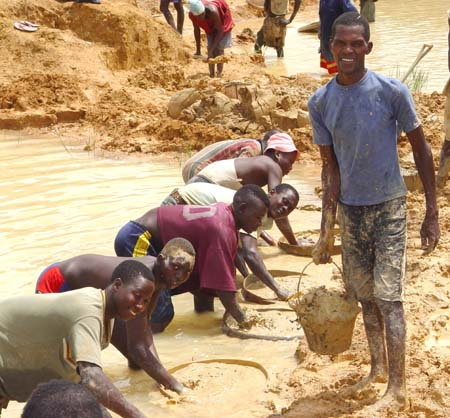
- Diamond miners in Sierra Leone
- Date: 19 December 2001
- Meeting no.: 4,442
- Code: S/RES/1385 (Document)
- Subject: The situation in Sierra Leone
- Voting summary: 15 voted for; None voted against; None abstained
- Result: Adopted

Security Council composition
- Permanent members: China; France; Russia; United Kingdom; United States
- Non-permanent members: Bangladesh; Colombia; Ireland; Jamaica; Mali; Mauritius; Norway; Singapore; Tunisia; Ukraine

United Nations Security Council resolution 1385, adopted unanimously on 19 December 2001, after recalling all resolutions on the situation in Sierra Leone, particularly resolutions 1132 (1997), 1171 (1998), 1299 (2000) and 1306 (2000), the Council extended sanctions against the import of rough diamonds except those controlled by the government from the country for a further 11 months, beginning on 5 January 2002.

The security council welcomed progress made in the Sierra Leone peace process and the efforts of the Sierra Leone government to extend its authority in diamond-producing areas with assistance from the United Nations Mission in Sierra Leone (UNAMSIL). There was concern at the role of the illicit trade of diamonds in the conflict. It welcomed the founding of a certification regime in relation to neighbouring Guinea's exports of rough diamonds, and there were efforts to break the link between armed conflict and the illicit trade in diamonds.

Acting under Chapter VII of the United Nations Charter, the council welcomed the establishment of a Certificate of Origin regime for the diamond trade in Sierra Leone and that it was curbing the flow of blood diamonds. The restrictions on the trade of conflict diamonds (except those controlled by the government) were extended for an additional 11 months. The resolution further noted that the council could terminate the measures if it so decided and requested the Secretary-General Kofi Annan to publicise the provisions of the current resolution and obligations it imposed.

== See also ==
- Kimberley Process Certification Scheme
- List of United Nations Security Council Resolutions 1301 to 1400 (2000–2002)
- Sierra Leone Civil War
- Special Court for Sierra Leone
