= Eli Izhakoff =

American businessperson

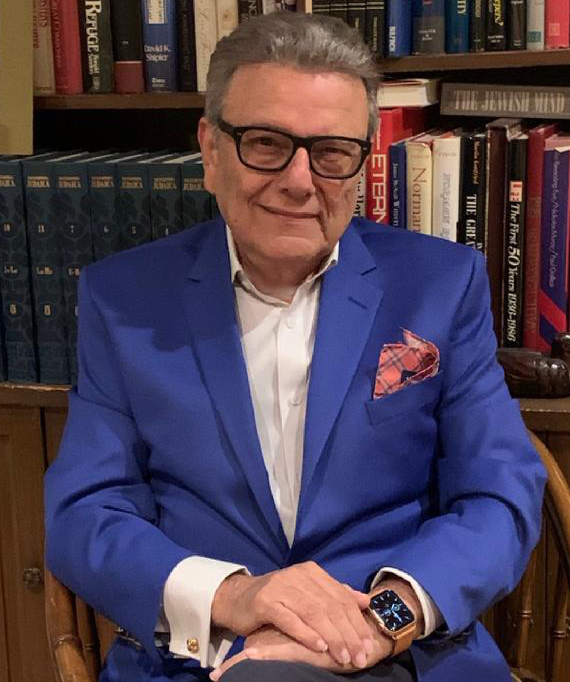
Eli Izhakoff

Eli Izhakoff is an American businessman in the international diamond and jewelry industry, filling a variety of public positions since 1979. He was the founding president of the World Diamond Council from 2000 to 2013.

== Early career ==
Izhakoff is a partner at J. Izhakoff & Sons, a diamond manufacturing and import/export firm, with offices in New York.

He joined the board of the Diamond Dealers Club in New York in 1979, later serving in senior roles, including chairman and secretary. In 1986, he became treasurer-general of the World Federation of Diamond Bourses and joined its executive committee.

In January 1990, Izhakoff was elected president of the Diamond Dealers Club and conceived and formed the Diamond Industry Steering Committee, an umbrella organization of the four diamond trade associations in New York, and served as its first chairman.

== World Federation of Diamond Bourses (WFDB) ==
At the May 1991 World Diamond Congress in London, Izhakoff was elected president of the World Federation of Diamond Bourses (WFDB). He was re-elected in 1993 (Antwerp) and 1996 (Tel Aviv).

During his presidency, the WFDB expanded, establishing new diamond bourses in Thailand, the United Arab Emirates, China, Russia, and India.

In June 1995, he helped organize an international diamond summit that highlighted Russia’s diamond industry. The event included a conference in Moscow and a tour of mining sites in the Republic of Sakha. At the summit, industry figures, including Izhakoff, Nicholas Oppenheimer, Gary Ralfe of De Beers, and Maurice Tempelsman of Lazare Kaplan International, received awards from Sakha’s president, Mikhail Yefimovich Nikolayev.

At the July 1998 World Diamond Congress in Bangkok, Izhakoff was named Honorary Life President of the WFDB.

== World Diamond Council ==
Following the emergence of the conflict diamond crisis in Africa in the late 1990s, Izhakoff was requested by industry leaders to head a new organization that would coordinate efforts to end the trade in rough diamonds financing civil conflict. Called the World Diamond Council (WDC), it was established at the World Diamond Congress in Antwerp, Belgium, in July 2000, and he was unanimously elected as its founding president.

Over the three years that followed, Izhakoff worked together with government representatives from around the world and representatives of civil society, to create an international system that will regulate the flow of rough diamonds into the distribution pipeline, in order to eliminate the presence of merchandise from areas of civil conflict. The Kimberley Process Certification Scheme was accepted an implemented in 2003, and endorsed by the United Nations Security Council. It is recognized as having reduced the number of conflict diamonds in the pipeline from more than 4 percent of the total to less than one tenth of 1 percent.

In November 2006, Izhakoff, briefed G8 ministers in Moscow on the Kimberley Process and its success as a possible model to meet the challenges of global terror.

A critical achievement was recorded during the 7thWorld Diamond Council Annual Meeting in St. Petersburg, Russia, in July 2010, when the Kimberley Process was able to reach consensus on an agreement that would enable the renewal of rough diamond exports from the Marange diamond fields in Zimbabwe, solving a crisis that threatened to paralyze the rough diamond trade. Izhakoff had earlier invited the Kimberley Process to hold a mini-summit in St. Petersburg alongside the World Diamond Council, in a further attempt to reach agreement over Marange. As a result, a senior delegation from the government of Zimbabwe, including Minister of Mining Obert Moses Mpofu, and Zimbabwe's attorney general, Johanne Tomama, traveled to St. Petersburg for the meeting. So did a high-level delegation from the U.S. State Department led by Susan Page, Assistant U.S. Deputy Secretary of State.

Just prior to the WDC Annual Meeting in St. Petersburg, Zimbabwe had released from custody Farai Maguwu, a local human rights activist who it earlier had been accused of providing false information prejudicial to the state in connection with the Marange diamond fields. During the meeting, Izhakoff publicly called on the Zimbabwe attorney general to drop the still-pending charges against Mr. Maguwu, and this eventually happened in October. In book he later contributed to about the period, Maguwu credited Izhakoff for helping obtain his release from custody and convincing the Zimbabwe authorities to drop the charges against him.

When he stepped down as WDC President in 2013, he was elected Honorary Life President of the organization.

== Panama ==
In 2014, Izhakoff was invited to assist in the development of a major project in the Republic of Panama, the goal of which was to establish the first dedicated diamond, colored gemstone and jewelry trading center in Latin America. Called the World Jewelry Hub, it also is the headquarters of Latin America's first recognized diamond bourse, the World Jewelry & Diamond Hub, Panama.

== Recognition and awards ==
Izhakoff holds the titles of Honorary Chairman of the Diamond Industry Steering Committee, New York, USA; Honorary President of the Diamond Dealers Club, New York, USA; and Honorary Chairman of the Bangkok Diamonds and Precious Stones Exchange, Bangkok, Thailand.

At the CIBJO Congress in Vancouver, Canada, in 2006, Izhakoff was named an Honorary Life President of CIBJO, The World Jewellery Confederation.

He has received the Officer of the Order of Leopold from the King of Belgium, the Rapaport Award for Corporate Social Responsibility, the Israel Diamond Industry Dignitary Award, the New York Diamond Industry Lifetime Achievement Award, Diamantaire of the Year from the World Federation of Diamond Bourses (WFDB), the Medal of Honor from the Israel Diamond Institute, a special award from the Israel Diamond Exchange, the Andrea Palladio International Jewellery Award for Corporate and Social Responsibility, and special honors from the president of the Republic of Sakha, the government of Thailand, the government of South Africa and the Dubai Multi Commodities Center.
