= Ruff&Cut =

American jewelry company

- Industry: Jewelry
- Founded: September 2008; 16 years ago
- Founder: Wade Watson
- Headquarters: New York City, New York, United States

Ruff&Cut is an American fine jewelry company founded by Wade Watson in 2008. The company sells ethically sourced jewelry items that contain conflict-free diamonds and gemstones and recycled metals.

== Overview ==
The company's headquarters are in New York City and its products are sold via e-commerce, retail and wholesale. The name "Ruff&Cut" refers to the ruff sandpiper bird, which inhabits southern Africa, and to cut diamonds; as a whole, "ruff and cut" is a play on words referring to rough and cut diamonds, as well as the ruff sandpiper.

== History ==
Although the company was officially launched in September 2008, founder Wade Watson started formulating Ruff&Cut in January 2007 when he became inspired to create a company that "gives back" after the September 11 attacks. He was already involved in the diamond mining trade, and decided to create a jewelry company with only conflict-free diamonds and recycled metals of 18k gold and sterling silver. Watson put together a team of designers interested in creating environmentally and socially conscious jewelry designs such as Todd Reed and Me&Ro and launched the official website containing all of the designs in September 2008.

== Social responsibility ==
The company "gives back" by donating 10% of proceeds to affiliated non-profit organizations such as Shine on Sierra Leone (SOSL) and the St. George Foundation. Watson's mining company Target Resources, on which he serves as executive vice president, has built schools, roads and bridges in the impoverished mining communities in Sierra Leone, Africa. Watson used funds and diamonds from Target to create jewelry for Ruff&Cut, ensuring that the diamonds used were indeed fair trade. On November 20, 2008, Watson attended Selita Ebanks event for her NGO, Women's Coalition for Empowerment and Opportunities fund-raiser in New York City, along with SOSL, and Watson has also spoken at several events regarding sustainability, such as UNICEF Fundraisers and on the Julie Watts special "From Sacramento to Sierra Leone" which aired December 2008.

== Authentication ==
All jewelry is made in America and all diamonds and gem stones are ethically sourced. Each piece is accompanied by a certificate of authentication which provides details on the style itself, as well as the diamond or diamonds contained in it. The rough diamonds are uncut and unpolished and many pieces are accompanied by cut and polished diamonds as well.

== See also ==
- The Jewelry Exchange
