= APDA =

APDA may refer to:

- African Diamond Producers Association
- American Parliamentary Debate Association
- Adult patent ductus arteriosus, a congenital heart disease
- American Parkinson Disease Association
- The Apple Programmers and Developer's Association
