= IMPACT (Canadian organization) =

Nongovernmental organization

- Formation: 1986
- Type: NGO
- Headquarters: Ottawa, Canada
- President: Rolland Morier
- Vice-President: Nicole Piggott
- Website: impacttransform.org/en/

IMPACT, formerly known as Partnership Africa Canada (PAC) until October 2017, is a non-governmental organization which attempts to control the sourcing of minerals in regions of conflict and campaign against "blood diamonds".

== Zimbabwe ==
Location of the Marange diamond fields roughly 90 km south west of Mutare.

IMPACT claimed that around $2bn (£1.26bn) worth of diamonds was stolen by Zimbabwe's rulers, such as the military, police, and "ruling elite", saying that "The scale of illegality is mind-blowing".

IMPACT also claimed that Robert Mugabe gained $2 billion from looting in the Marange diamond fields in 2012. IMPACT went on to say that "This shows Zimbabwe was wilfully in breach of the ... ban on Marange diamonds", following the leaking of a document from the Mineral Marketing Corporation, which detailed the proposed sale of $200 million worth of illegal diamonds through several Zimbabwe banks. This led to criticism from IMPACT, and the Human Rights Watch.

=== Diamond sale ===
Alan Martin went on to criticise major European banks, such as Barclays, for having investments in some of the Zimbabwe banks involved in the sale of diamonds; saying "By facilitating these transactions, Barclays, Stanbic (Standard Bank) and the IFC are participating in diamond-related violence".

== Publications ==
In 2000, Partnership Africa Canada released a report entitled The Heart of the Matter: Sierra Leone, Diamonds & Human Security: Complete Report about the effect of diamonds in Sierra Leone. Since that time, they have produced a number of reports on the state of the diamond industry, and efforts to control the flow of conflict minerals.

== Awards ==
In 2003, Partnership Africa Canada was nominated jointly for the Nobel Peace Prize, with Global Witness for their role in establishing the Kimberley Process Certification Scheme to limit the ability of armed groups to fund their operations through the sale of conflict diamonds They were jointly nominated by the American Senator Patrick Leahy, and the American Representatives Ralph Hall and Frank Wolf. However, the award was won by Shirin Ebadi for her work on democracy and human rights.
