= United Nations Security Council Resolution 1395 =

UN Security Council Resolution 1395
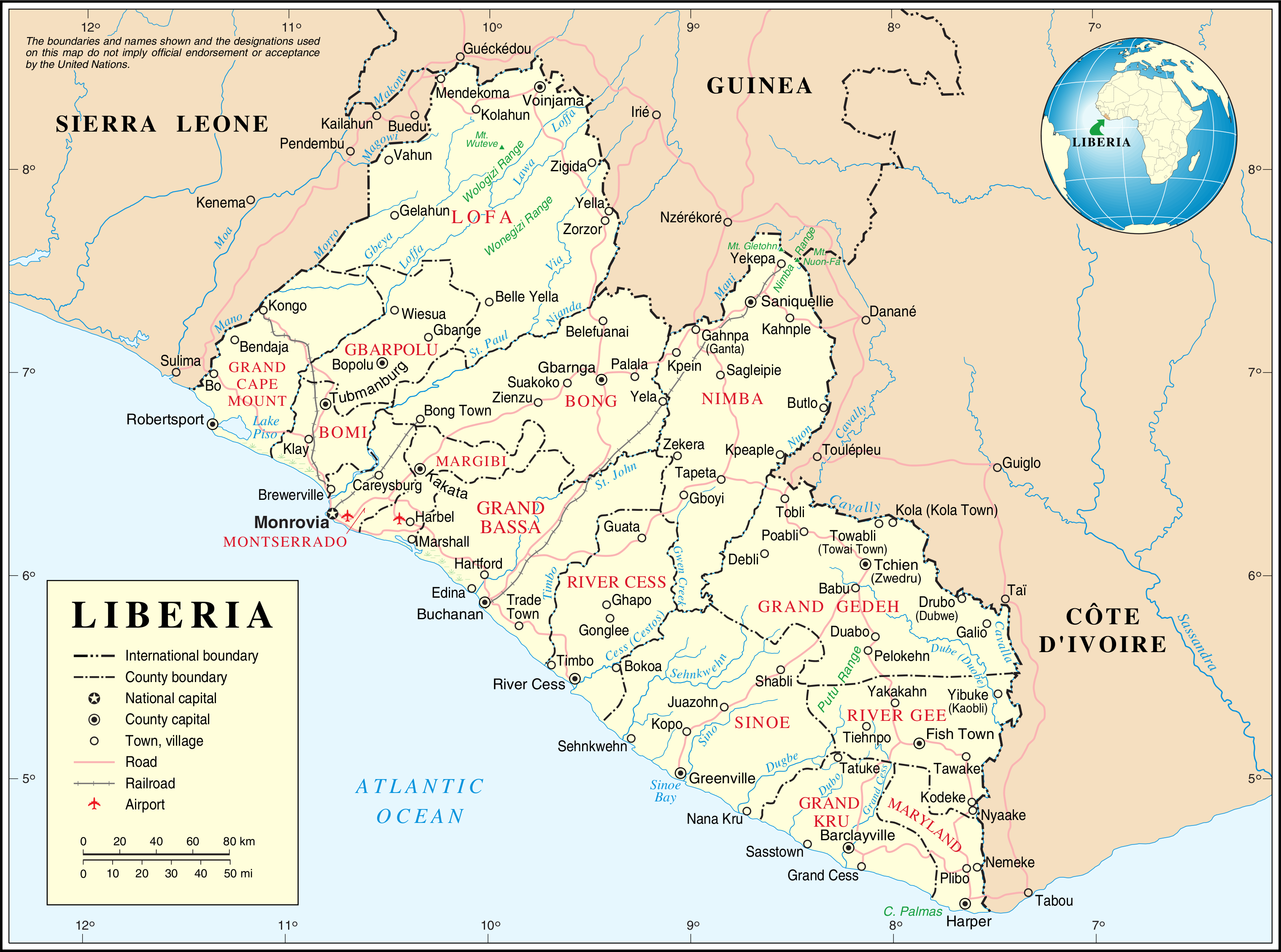
- Liberia
- Date: 27 February 2002
- Meeting no.: 4,481
- Code: S/RES/1395 (Document)
- Subject: The situation in Liberia
- Voting summary: 15 voted for; None voted against; None abstained
- Result: Adopted

Security Council composition
- Permanent members: China; France; Russia; United Kingdom; United States
- Non-permanent members: Bulgaria; Cameroon; Colombia; Guinea; Ireland; Mauritius; Mexico; Norway; Singapore; Syria

United Nations Security Council resolution 1395, adopted unanimously on 27 February 2002, after reaffirming Resolution 1343 (2001) which imposed sanctions on Liberia for support of rebels during the civil war in Sierra Leone, the Council re-established an expert panel to monitor compliance with the restrictions relating to embargoes on arms and unofficial rough diamonds from Sierra Leone.

The Security Council noted that the next six-monthly review of the sanctions against Liberia was scheduled to take place before 6 May 2002 and recognised the importance of monitoring the sanctions. The expert panel established in Resolution 1343 was re-established for a period of five weeks beginning no later than 11 March 2002. The panel was requested to conduct an independent audit of compliance by the Liberian government with Security Council demands and to report by 8 April 2002 with its findings and recommendations.

The resolution instructed the Secretary-General Kofi Annan to appoint no more than five experts for the panel and make financial arrangements to support its work. Finally, all states were called upon to co-operate with the panel.

== See also ==
- Blood diamonds
- List of United Nations Security Council Resolutions 1301 to 1400 (2000–2002)
- Sierra Leone Civil War
- Special Court for Sierra Leone
