= United Nations Security Council Resolution 1295 =

UN Security Council Resolution 1295
- Location of SADC in the world
- Date: 18 April 2000
- Meeting no.: 4,129
- Code: S/RES/1295 (Document)
- Subject: The situation in Angola
- Voting summary: 15 voted for; None voted against; None abstained
- Result: Adopted

Security Council composition
- Permanent members: China; France; Russia; United Kingdom; United States
- Non-permanent members: Argentina; Bangladesh; Canada; Jamaica; Malaysia; Mali; Namibia; Netherlands; Tunisia; Ukraine

United Nations Security Council resolution 1295, adopted unanimously on 18 April 2000, after reaffirming Resolution 864 (1993) and all subsequent resolutions on Angola, particularly resolutions 1127 (1997), 1173 (1998) and 1237 (1999), the Council authorised a tightening of sanctions against UNITA and established a panel of experts to investigation violations of Security Council resolutions imposing measures against UNITA.

Resolution 1295 was adopted in the aftermath of the Fowler Report, which detailed how countries worldwide were violating sanctions against UNITA.

== Resolution ==
=== Observations ===
The Security Council expressed its alarm at the continuing civil war in Angola and its impact on the civilian population. It reiterated that the primary cause of the crisis in Angola was the failure of UNITA, under the leadership of Jonas Savimbi, to comply with obligations under the Acordos de Paz, Lusaka Protocol and relevant Security Council resolutions. In this regard, it demanded that UNITA immediately and unconditionally complete the demilitarisation of its forces and co-operate in the extension of state authority throughout Angola.

The council noted that the measures against UNITA were intended to promote a political settlement of the conflict by restricting its ability to achieve goals through military means. There were violations of the measures relating to the provisions of arms and related materiel, petroleum and petroleum products, diamonds, funds and financial assets and travel and representation against UNITA. The preamble of the resolution also expressed concern at the provision of military assistance to UNITA and presence of foreign mercenaries. It welcomed decisions by the chairman of the committee established in Resolution 864 to improve the effectiveness of the sanctions, and of the Organisation of African Unity (OAU) and Southern African Development Community (SADC) supporting measures against UNITA.

=== Acts ===
The resolution, proposed by Canada, was divided into several sections concerning different aspects of the measures against UNITA.

==== Violation of sanctions against UNITA ====
Acting under Chapter VII of the United Nations Charter, the council stressed the importance of all states complying with measures imposed against UNITA in previous Security Council resolutions. The Secretary-General Kofi Annan was required to establish a monitoring mechanism consisting of up to five experts to investigate alleged violations of the sanctions against UNITA for a period of six months. They were instructed to provide a report on their findings by 18 October 2000 with a view to improving the measures. The council would then, upon the receipt of the report, consider ways of improving the sanctions and action under the United Nations Charter for states involved in the violation of the measures.

==== Trade in arms ====
All countries were urged to be vigilant so as to avoid the transfer of weapons to unauthorised users or destinations and were encouraged to ensure effective monitoring in this regard. Countries were also invited to consider to convene conferences with states where weapons were manufactured or exported for the purposes of ending illicit flows of weapons into Angola. Representatives from SADC were invited to participate.

==== Trade in petroleum and petroleum products ====
The convening of a conference on methods of curbing the illegal supply of petroleum or petroleum products into Angola was encouraged by the council, such as monitoring of supplies of oil in the area and the role of SADC in this process. SADC was invited to monitor the border areas with Angola counter arms smuggling and was asked to take the lead against the illegal fuel supplies to UNITA.

==== Trade in diamonds ====
The council was concerned that the trade in diamonds was a major source of funding for UNITA. Diamond trading countries were asked to impose severe penalties for possession of diamonds in violation of Resolution 1173. Belgium had announced steps in that direction and it was called upon to restrict UNITA's access to the diamond market and other countries were asked to adopt similar measures.

==== Funds and financial measures ====
Countries were encouraged to hold a conference on ways to strengthen the implementation of the financial measures imposed against UNITA. They were asked to work with financial institutions on their territory to identify funds and assets and the freezing of such funds.

==== Travel and representation ====
It was important that all countries continued with travel bans against UNITA officials and their families, and to withdraw travel documents to those residing in their territory. The Committee and Government of Angola was asked to update the list of such persons subject to travel restrictions.

==== Additional steps ====
SADC countries were asked to consider additional measures for air traffic in the region for detecting illegal flight activities across borders and were invited to co-operate with the International Civil Aviation Organization in this respect. The resolution called upon countries near Angola to enact domestic legislation making it a criminal offence to violate measures against UNITA imposed by the Security Council. The Secretary-General was invited to strengthen co-operation between the United Nations and regional and subregional organisations, including Interpol to monitor and enforce the sanctions.

The Council welcomed international support for the measures against UNITA and underlined the important role that SADC would play in the implementation of the sanctions.

== See also ==
- Angolan Civil War
- Blood diamonds
- Kimberley Process Certification Scheme
- List of United Nations Security Council Resolutions 1201 to 1300 (1998–2000)
