= United Nations Security Council Resolution 1306 =

UN Security Council Resolution 1306
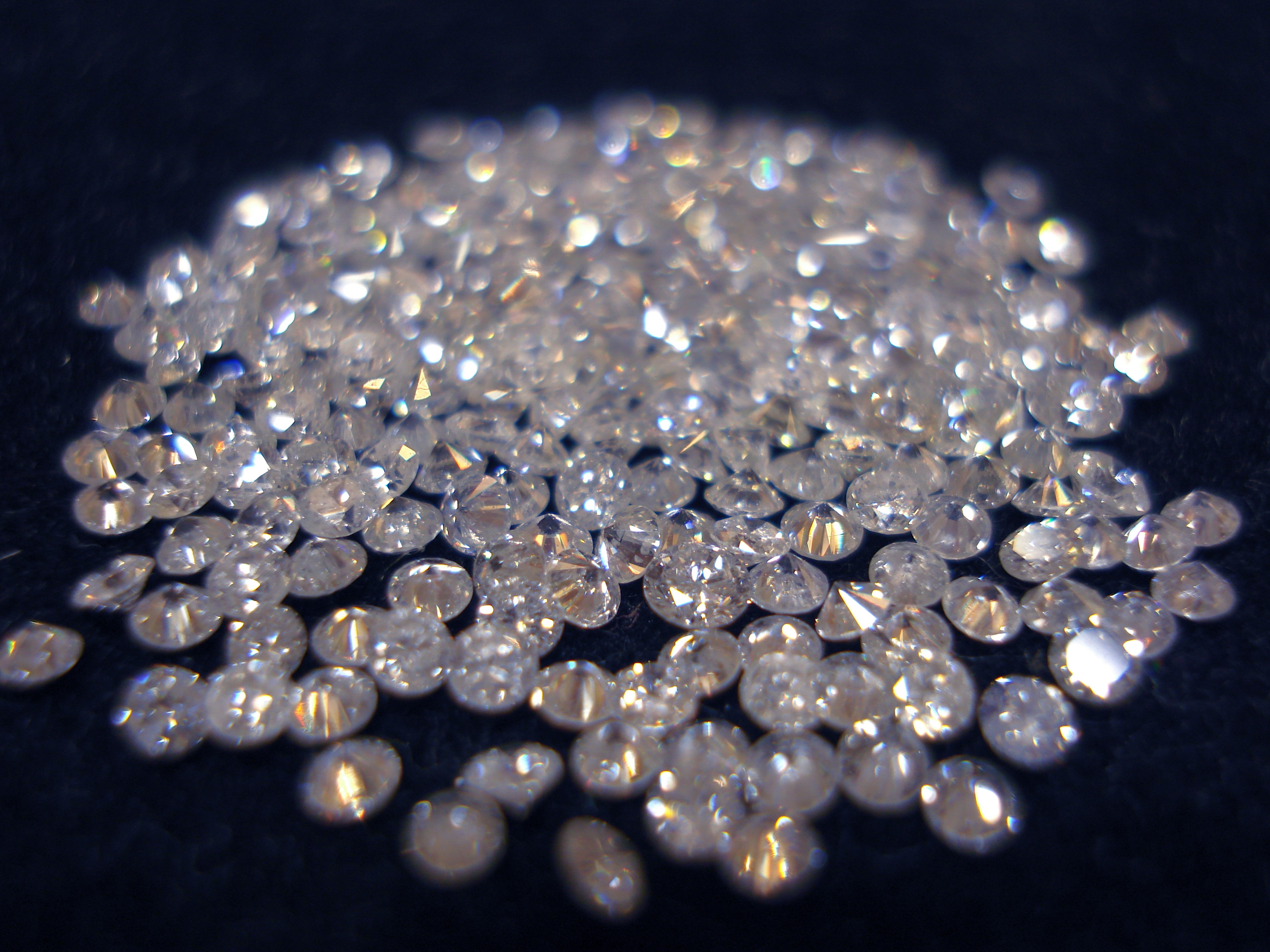
- Diamonds
- Date: 5 July 2000
- Meeting no.: 4,168
- Code: S/RES/1306 (Document)
- Subject: The situation in Sierra Leone
- Voting summary: 14 voted for; None voted against; 1 abstained
- Result: Adopted

Security Council composition
- Permanent members: China; France; Russia; United Kingdom; United States
- Non-permanent members: Argentina; Bangladesh; Canada; Jamaica; Malaysia; Mali; Namibia; Netherlands; Tunisia; Ukraine

United Nations Security Council resolution 1306, adopted on 5 July 2000, after recalling all previous resolutions on the situation in Sierra Leone, particularly resolutions 1132 (1997), 1171 (1998) and 1299 (2000), the Council decided to prohibit the direct or indirect import of rough diamonds from the country. The rebel Revolutionary United Front controlled 90% of the diamond-producing areas in Sierra Leone and was using diamonds to finance its operations.

Resolution 1306 was adopted by 14 votes to none against and one abstention from Mali, which at the time was also the chair of the Economic Community of West African States (ECOWAS) and had felt its position was not taken into account in the text of the resolution.

== Resolution ==
The resolution, enacted under Chapter VII of the United Nations Charter, was divided into two parts to address sanctions on diamonds and the arms embargo on the country (but not the government) referred to in Resolution 1171.

=== On diamonds ===
==== Observations ====
The illegal diamond trade fueled the conflict in Sierra Leone, and there was concern at their transit to neighbouring countries, particularly Liberia. The Council welcomed efforts by the diamond industry to work on a more transparent system of diamond trading. It reaffirmed that the legitimate diamond trade was of economic importance for many countries that had a positive impact on prosperity and stability. To this end, the resolution was not intended to undermine the industry, the Council declared. ECOWAS had decided to conduct a regional study on illegal trade in diamonds.

==== Acts ====
The council decided to ban the direct or indirect import of all rough diamonds from Sierra Leone to their territory for an initial period of 18 months. The Government of Sierra Leone, with assistance from the international community and organisations, was requested to immediately establish a certificate of origin regime. Diamonds under the control of the government were excluded from the prohibitions. The measures would be reviewed by 15 September 2000 and every six months thereafter.

The committee established in Resolution 1132 was to gather information on measures taken by countries to implement the diamond import ban, investigation violations and make recommendations on improving the sanctions regime. All countries and organisations were instructed to strictly enforce the measures. It was also requested to co-operate with similar committees established in Resolution 985 (1995) on Liberia and Resolution 864 (1993) on Angola. Meanwhile, the committee was also asked to conduct an exploratory hearing in New York City by 31 July 2000 to assess the role of diamonds in the civil war in Sierra Leone.

Finally, the council welcomed efforts by the some elements of the diamond industry to not trade diamonds in conflict zones, and stressed the need for the extension of government authority in areas that produced diamonds for a durable solution to the illegal exploitation of diamonds.

=== On the arms embargo ===
==== Observations ====
The resolution stressed that it was important that measures relating to the arms embargo in Resolution 1171 were implemented effectively with the compliance of all states. ECOWAS had adopted a moratorium imposed on the import, export and manufacture of light weapons in West Africa.

==== Acts ====
All countries were reminded of their obligations under the embargo and they were asked to report violations to the Committee of the Security Council. The Secretary-General Kofi Annan was requested to establish a panel of no more than five members for a period of four months to investigate violations of measures imposed in Resolution 1171 (a travel ban was also in effect) and make recommendations on the effectiveness of air control for the purpose of detecting aircraft flights suspected of carrying arms and related materiel in violation of resolutions. It was also asked to investigate links between the diamond sector and arms trade.

The resolution concluded by directing the committee to improve contacts with ECOWAS, the Organisation of African Unity and international organisations such as Interpol with a view to publicising its findings through appropriate media.

== See also ==
- Blood diamond
- Kimberley Process Certification Scheme
- List of United Nations Security Council Resolutions 1301 to 1400 (2000–2002)
- Lomé Peace Accord
- Revolutionary United Front
- Sierra Leone Civil War
