= World Diamond Council =

The World Diamond Council is an organization representing the entire diamond value chain including representatives from diamond mining, manufacturing, trading and retail. The council was established in July 2000. The purpose was to create a system to keep the supply chain of diamonds as free as possible from conflict diamonds.

In December 2000, the United Nations General Assembly adopted a landmark resolution supporting the creation of an international certification scheme for rough diamonds. By November 2002, negotiations between governments, the international diamond industry and civil society organisations resulted in the creation of the Kimberley Process Certification Scheme (KPCS). The KPCS document sets out the requirements for controlling rough diamond production and trade. The KPCS entered into force in 2003, when participating countries started to implement its rules.

The KPCS is credited as being instrumental toward dramatically reducing “conflict diamonds” to less than 1% of the world's diamond production today.

The World Diamond Council has representation on all the Kimberley Process's working groups and is influential in determining its implementation and future reform.

The council was set up in July 2000 in Antwerp, Belgium after a joint meeting of the World Federation of Diamond Bourses (WFDB), representing all the world's significant diamond trading centres, and the International Diamond Manufacturers Association (IDMA), representing significant manufacturers. The founding president was Eli Izhakoff, who served in the position until July 2013.

Charter members are the WFDB, the IDMA and International Confederation of Jewellers (CIBJO).

The council, headquartered in the US, is currently led by President Edward Asscher from Amsterdam, Netherlands.

== See also ==
- Diamond (gemstone)
