= United Nations Security Council Resolution 1299 =

UN Security Council Resolution 1299
- Sierra Leone
- Date: 19 May 2000
- Meeting no.: 4,145
- Code: S/RES/1299 (Document)
- Subject: The situation in Sierra Leone
- Voting summary: 15 voted for; None voted against; None abstained
- Result: Adopted

Security Council composition
- Permanent members: China; France; Russia; United Kingdom; United States
- Non-permanent members: Argentina; Bangladesh; Canada; Jamaica; Malaysia; Mali; Namibia; Netherlands; Tunisia; Ukraine

United Nations Security Council resolution 1299 was adopted unanimously on 19 May 2000, after recalling all previous resolutions on the situation in Sierra Leone. The Council expanded the military component of the United Nations Mission in Sierra Leone (UNAMSIL) to include a maximum of 13,000 personnel.

Having been convinced of the deteriorating security situation in Sierra Leone, the Council declared that a rapid deployment of reinforcements for UNAMSIL was necessary, and the operation was therefore expanded to a maximum of 13,000 military personnel including 260 military observers already present in the country. It commended states who had made troops available to UNAMSIL, accelerated deployment and offered other forms of military assistance.

Finally, acting under Chapter VII of the United Nations Charter, the Council decided that restrictions imposed in Resolution 1171 (1998) did not apply to states co-operating with UNAMSIL or the Government of Sierra Leone.

== See also ==
- List of United Nations Security Council Resolutions 1201 to 1300 (1998–2000)
- Lomé Peace Accord
- Revolutionary United Front
- Sierra Leone Civil War
