= United Nations Security Council Resolution 1343 =

UN Security Council Resolution 1343
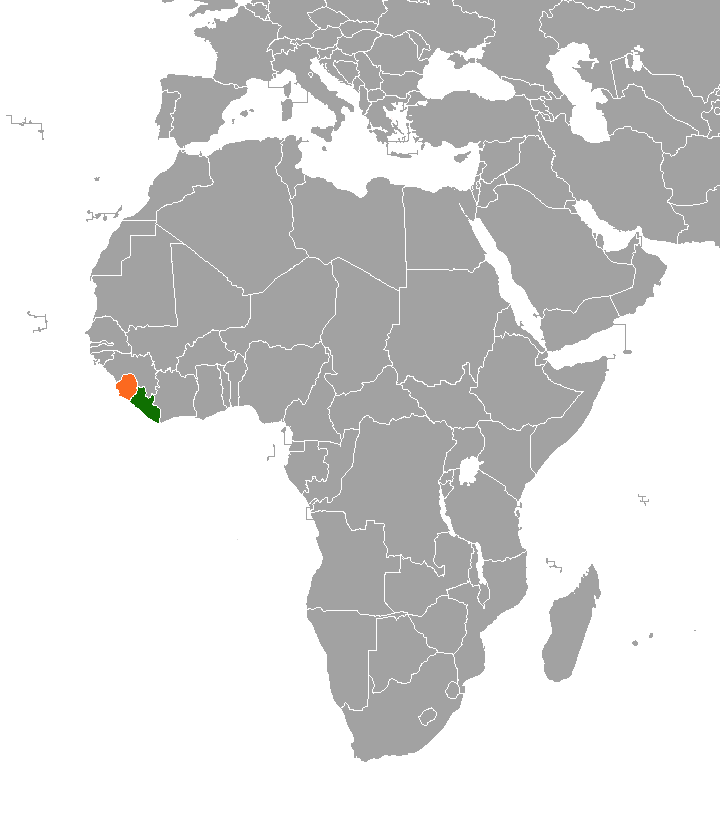
- Locations of Sierra Leone and Liberia in Africa
- Date: 7 March 2001
- Meeting no.: 4,287
- Code: S/RES/1343 (Document)
- Subject: The situation in Sierra Leone
- Voting summary: 15 voted for; None voted against; None abstained
- Result: Adopted

Security Council composition
- Permanent members: China; France; Russia; United Kingdom; United States
- Non-permanent members: Bangladesh; Colombia; Ireland; Jamaica; Mali; Mauritius; Norway; Singapore; Tunisia; Ukraine

United Nations Security Council resolution 1343, adopted unanimously on 7 March 2001, after recalling resolutions on Sierra Leone and the region, including resolutions 1132 (1997), 1171 (1998) and 1306 (2000), the Council demanded that Liberia end its support for rebels in Sierra Leone and threatened the imposition of wide-ranging sanctions unless the country complied with the Security Council.

The Economic Community of West African States (ECOWAS) urged the United Nations to delay the coming into force of the restrictions against Liberia. The sanctions came into effect in May 2001, after the Liberian government maintained contacts with rebels in Sierra Leone in violation of Security Council demands.

== Resolution ==
=== Observations ===
It was recognised that diamonds provided a major source of income for the Revolutionary United Front (RUF) and other armed groups in Sierra Leone. The diamonds would leave Sierra Leone through Liberia with permission from Liberian authorities, and there was concern at evidence that the Liberian government was supporting the RUF at all levels. The illicit diamond trade was fuelling the conflict in Sierra Leone and transiting neighbouring countries including Liberia.

The council reiterated the call on all West African states, particularly Liberia, to cease military support for armed groups in neighbouring countries or allowing their territory to be used for attacks by individuals against other states. It determined that the support for RUF rebels in Sierra Leone by the Liberian government constituted a threat to international peace and security.

=== Acts ===
The following provisions were enacted under Chapter VII of the United Nations Charter, thus making them legally enforceable.

==== A ====
The security council recalled resolutions 788 (1992) and 985 (1995) and noted that the Liberian conflict had been resolved and elections had taken place. The arms embargo was terminated and Committee established to monitor the sanctions dissolved.

==== B ====
The resolution demanded that the Liberian government end its support for rebels in Sierra Leone and expel RUF members from its country; end financial and military support; cease import of rough diamonds; freeze RUF assets and ground Liberia-registered aircraft operating within its jurisdiction until a proper registration system was in place. Furthermore, the President of Liberia Charles Taylor was asked to allow the United Nations Mission in Sierra Leone (UNAMSIL) freedom of movement in the country and return seized weapons and equipment; release all abductees and enter their fighters into disarmament, demobilization and reintegration programmes. It demanded that all states in the region take action to prevent armed attacks against neighbouring countries that could contribute to the destabilisation of the situation at the borders between Guinea, Sierra Leone and Liberia.

All countries were then instructed to implement an arms embargo against Liberia including the prevention of military assistance; the measures would not apply to resources destined for United Nations or humanitarian personnel. The import of rough diamonds from Liberia was prohibited and a travel ban imposed on senior Liberian government officials, army officials and others providing aid to rebels in Sierra Leone; humanitarian and religious exceptions to the restrictions would be granted by a Committee of the Security Council established in the current resolution. The Council decided that the sanctions would come into effect at 00:01 EST two months following the adoption of the current resolution unless Liberia had complied with Security Council demands. If there was no compliance, the arms embargo would be in effect for 14 months and the arms embargo and travel ban for 12 months, both of which were to be followed by a review. In this regard, the Secretary-General Kofi Annan was requested to submit his first report on 30 April 2001 and every six months thereafter on whether there had been progress on Liberian compliance with Security Council demands and other aspects of the situation in the country.

The security council authorised the establishment of a Committee to gather information on what measures states had taken to implement the restrictions, investigate violations and make recommendations to improve their effectiveness. The Liberian government and diamond exporting countries in West Africa were called upon to establish Certificate of Origin regimes. Countries were asked to combat the proliferation and trafficking of weapons in West Africa and to report within 30 days on the measures they had taken to implement the sanctions against Liberia.

The secretary-general was requested to establish an expert panel for six months consisting of up to five members to investigate links between the exploitation of natural resources and the conflict in Sierra Leone and neighbouring countries and monitor the compliance of the Liberian government with security council demands. Any information the panel found, particularly regarding violations of the sanctions, would be brought to the concerned Member States' attention. All countries were urged to co-operate with the committee and expert panel, with the Council decided to conduct a review of the sanctions within 60 days and every six months thereafter.

== See also ==
- Blood diamonds
- List of United Nations Security Council Resolutions 1301 to 1400 (2000–2002)
- Sierra Leone Civil War
- Special Court for Sierra Leone
