= United Nations Security Council Resolution 1400 =

UN Security Council Resolution 1400
- Sierra Leone
- Date: 28 March 2002
- Meeting no.: 4,500
- Code: S/RES/1400 (Document)
- Subject: The situation in Sierra Leone
- Voting summary: 15 voted for; None voted against; None abstained
- Result: Adopted

Security Council composition
- Permanent members: China; France; Russia; United Kingdom; United States
- Non-permanent members: Bulgaria; Cameroon; Colombia; Guinea; Ireland; Mauritius; Mexico; Norway; Singapore; Syria

United Nations Security Council resolution 1400, adopted unanimously on 28 March 2002, after recalling all previous resolutions on the situation in Sierra Leone, the Council extended the mandate of the United Nations Mission in Sierra Leone (UNAMSIL) for a further six months until 30 September 2002 in the run up to the May 2002 general elections.

== Resolution ==
=== Observations ===
The Security Council welcomed progress in the Sierra Leonean peace process, including the lifting of a state of emergency. Meanwhile, the situation in the Mano River region remained fragile and there was a significant increase in the number of refugees. It emphasised the importance of free and fair elections, the extension of state authority throughout the country, reintegration of ex-combatants, respect for human rights, the unhindered return of refugees and internally displaced persons and taking action to end impunity. An agreement between the Sierra Leonean government and United Nations to establish a Special Court was welcomed.

=== Acts ===
The Sierra Leone government and Revolutionary United Front (RUF) were encouraged to strengthen efforts towards the implementation of the Ceasefire Agreement signed in Abuja and further dialogue and national reconciliation. The Council welcomed the completion of the disarmament process and expressed concern at a financial shortfall in the multi-donor trust fund. It urged the restoration of civil authority and public services, particularly in the diamond mining areas, and welcomed the deployment of the Sierra Leone Armed Forces on border security operations.

The resolution welcomed the establishment of an electoral component in UNAMSIL, a Truth and Reconciliation Commission and the recruitment of a further 30 police advisers. There was concern at violence, particularly sexual violence, against women and children during the conflict, including by personnel from the United Nations. Furthermore, UNAMSIL had reported evidence of violations of human rights and international humanitarian law. The Secretary-General Kofi Annan was to investigate the allegations of abuse by UNAMSIL personnel, and was to report by 30 June 2002 on the post-electoral, human rights and humanitarian situation in Sierra Leone.

== See also ==
- Elections in Sierra Leone
- List of United Nations Security Council Resolutions 1301 to 1400 (2000–2002)
- Sierra Leone Civil War
