= African Diamond Producers Association =

Intergovernmental organization

African Diamond Producers Association (ADPA)
- Type: Intergovernmental organization
- Industry: Diamond
- Founded: November 4, 2006
- Headquarters: Luanda, Angola
- Key people: Mrs. Ellah Muchemwa - ADPA Executive Director Mrs. Martha Haindongo - Deputy Executive Director for Planning and Strategy Mrs. Justina Tavares da Asunção Fernando - Deputy Executive Director for Operational Support
- Number of employees: 13 (2024)

The African Diamond Producers Association (ADPA) is an intergovernmental organization of leading diamond-producing nations. Founded on 4 November 2006 through the Luanda Declaration, ADPA is headquartered in Luanda, Republic of Angola.

== Strategic objectives ==
- To promote cooperation and mutual assistance among Member States on policies and strategies in diamond exploration, mining, cutting, polishing, and trading.
- The adoption of harmonized legal solutions between Member States in areas related to exploration, mining, cutting, and trade in diamonds, where individuals in Member States have acquired valuable experience.
- Development of human resources and promotion of mutual technical assistance in coordinating policies and strategies for the development of the diamond industry.
- Transformation of conflict diamonds, wherever they exist, into diamonds for peace and sustainable development, in accordance with the minimum requirements of the Kimberley Process Certification Scheme.

== Vision ==
To be a strategic platform for cooperation and coordination that promotes a sustainable and dynamic African diamond industry that contributes to stability and prosperity.

== Mission ==
To maximize the potential of ADPA Member States and Observers through coordinated cooperation, creating an enabling environment through policy adoption, and technical advancement across the diamond value chain to build sustainable livelihoods of communities.

== Core values ==
- Accountability
- Collaboration
- Integrity
- Excellency
- Innovation
- Transparency

== Governance Structure ==
The Association has the following bodies:

=== Council of Ministers ===
The Council of Ministers is the highest deliberative body composed of Ministers responsible for the mining sector or any other Minister from Effective member and Observer duly authorised to do so.

- The Chairperson of the ADPA Council is elected at the Ordinary meeting of the Council of Ministers and shall hold office for two years.
- ADPA Chairperson for 2023-2024 is Honorable Zhemu Soda, Minister of Mines and Mining Development of the Republic of Zimbabwe.
- The Vice Chairperson for 2023 - 2024 is Honorable Julius Daniel Matta, Minister of Mines and Mineral Resources of the Republic of Sierra Leone.

=== Committee of Experts ===
- Consultation body of the Council of Ministers and supervision body of the Executive Directorate.
- Composed of senior officials from Effective Members and Observers.
- Divided into two working groups: technical advisors and internal auditors.

=== Executive Directorate ===
The Executive Directorate is responsible for the day-to-day management and implements policies and strategies set by the Council of Ministers and currently comprises the following:

- Executive Director – Ellah Muchemwa
- Deputy Executive Director for Planning and Strategy – Martha Haindongo
- Deputy Executive Director for Operational Support – Justina Fernando.

== Members ==
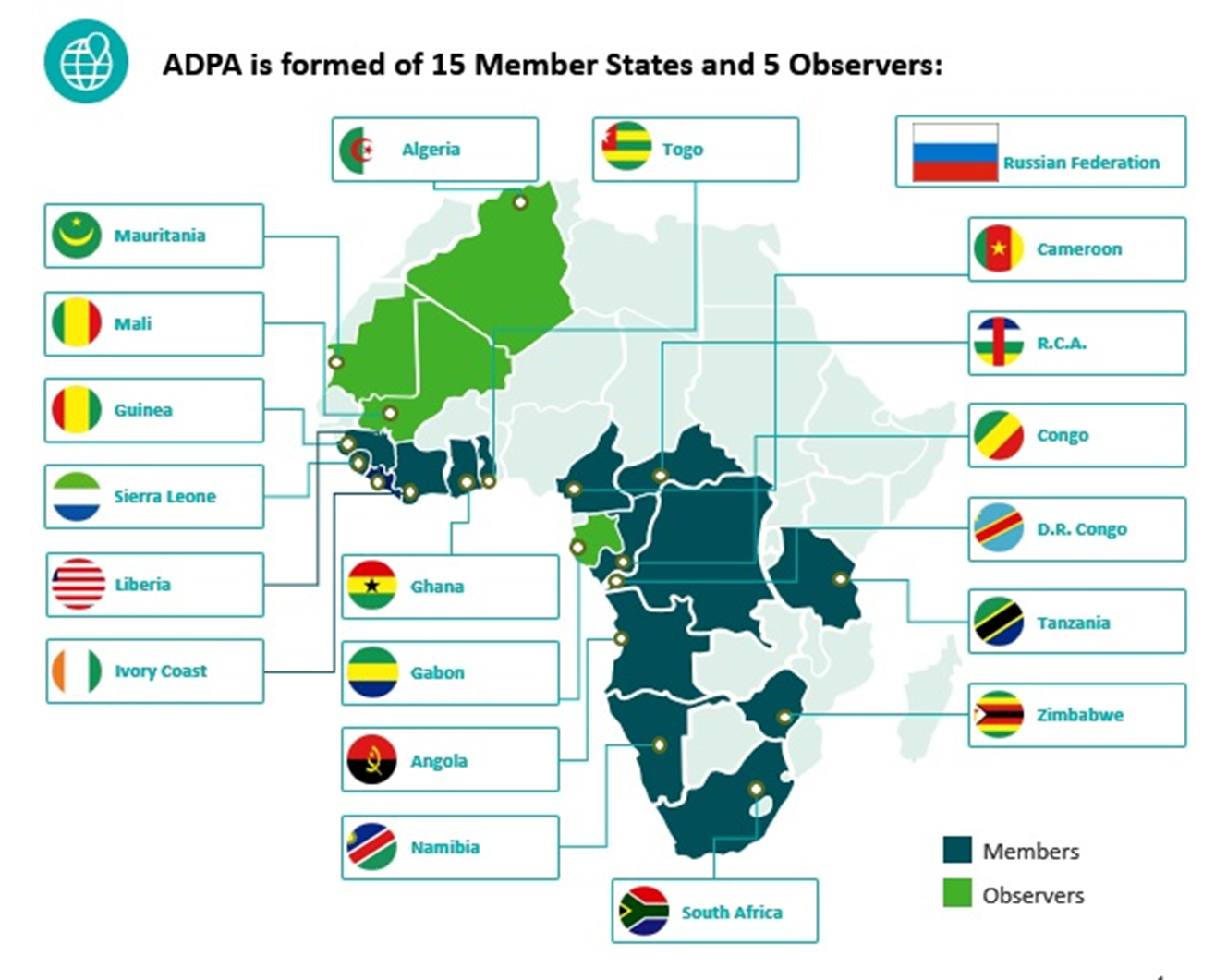
APDA Membership Member Observer

Effective members are those African diamond-producing countries that have signed or ratified the ADPA Statute and meet the requirements of the Kimberley Process Certification Scheme (KPCS).

1. Angola
2. Cameroon
3. Central African Republic
4. Côte d'Ivoire
5. Democratic Republic of the Congo
6. Ghana
7. Guinea
8. Liberia
9. Namibia
10. Republic of the Congo
11. Sierra Leone
12. South Africa
13. Tanzania
14. Togo
15. Zimbabwe

== Observers ==
All African nations with diamond potential can apply for membership, regardless of the timeframe for becoming producers.

Diamond-producing African countries not meeting the requirements of the KPCS.

Non-African countries or organizations involved in the diamond value chain can join if they meet the criteria as stipulated in the Statute and internal regulations.

Currently, ADPA has five observers:

1. Algeria
2. Mali
3. Mauritania
4. Gabon
5. Russian Federation
