= United Nations Security Council Resolution 1173 =

UN Security Council Resolution 1173
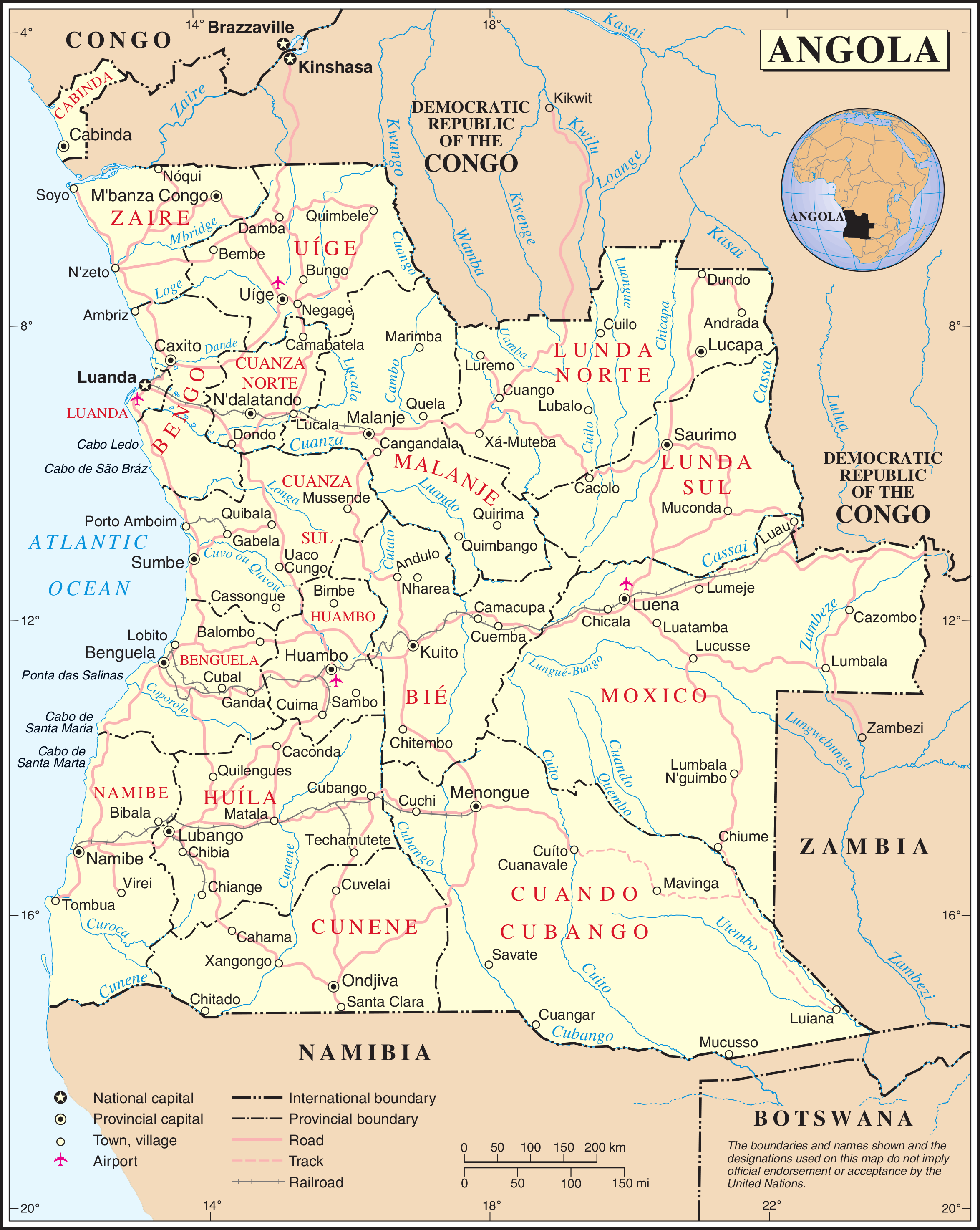
- Angola
- Date: 12 June 1998
- Meeting no.: 3,891
- Code: S/RES/1173 (Document)
- Subject: The situation in Angola
- Voting summary: 15 voted for; None voted against; None abstained
- Result: Adopted

Security Council composition
- Permanent members: China; France; Russia; United Kingdom; United States
- Non-permanent members: Bahrain; Brazil; Costa Rica; Gabon; Gambia; Japan; Kenya; Portugal; Slovenia; Sweden

United Nations Security Council resolution 1173, adopted unanimously on 12 June 1998, after reaffirming Resolution 696 (1991) and all subsequent resolutions on Angola, particularly Resolution 1127 (1997), the council announced its intention to impose further sanctions against UNITA for non-compliance, unless it co-operated to extend state administration throughout the country.

The security council expressed concern at the situation in the peace process, brought about by UNITA's failure to implement measures under the Acordos de Paz, Lusaka Protocol and resolutions by the Security Council. At the same time, it was recognised that the Government of Unity and National Reconciliation (GURN) had made progress in ending hostile propaganda in the state-controlled media and reduced brutality by the Angolan National Police.

The resolution condemned UNITA for not implementing aspects of the peace agreements and security council resolutions, demanding that it restore state authority in areas such as Andulo, Bailundo, Mungo and Nharea. It also reiterated demands for UNITA to complete demobilisation, co-operate with the United Nations Observer Mission in Angola (MONUA) and cease attacks on MONUA, international personnel, police and civilians. MONUA was redeployed to the areas where the extension of state administration was to take place, and both the GURN and UNITA were urged to refrain from actions that could escalate tensions.

Acting under Chapter VII of the United Nations Charter, the council demanded that all countries freeze assets of UNITA in their territories, deciding further that member states should:

(a) prevent contacts with UNITA in areas where state administration had not been extended;
(b) prohibit the import of diamonds not controlled through the certificate of origin scheme or Angolan government;
(c) prevent the sale of mining equipment to areas not under state administration;
(d) prevent the sale of motorised vehicles or watercraft and equipment or spare parts.

The committee established in Resolution 864 (1993) would grant exceptions to the measures upon request. The restrictions would come into force at 00:01 EST on 25 June 1998 unless decided otherwise, and a review would be undertaken of the restrictions, including the possibility of further measures.

The GURN was requested to notify the committee which areas it did not control, further requesting the committee to report to the council by 31 July 1998 on the imposition of the measures and for countries to report on the measures they had taken by 15 July 1998.

== See also ==
- Angolan Civil War
- Blood diamond
- List of United Nations Security Council Resolutions 1101 to 1200 (1997–1998)
- United Nations Security Council Resolution 1176
- United Nations Security Council Resolution 1295
