= Kimberley Process Certification Scheme =

Process to certify the origin of rough diamonds

Countries who are participants and official applicants Participant ongoing conflict Official applicants ongoing conflict Ongoing conflicts in Africa

The Kimberley Process Certification Scheme (KPCS) is the process established in 2003 to prevent "conflict diamonds" from entering the mainstream rough diamond market.

The scheme was established under United Nations General Assembly Resolution 55/56, following recommendations in the Fowler Report of March 2000. The process was set up "to ensure that diamond purchases were not financing violence by rebel movements and their allies seeking to undermine legitimate governments".

In order for a country to be a participant, it must ensure that any diamond originating from the country does not finance a rebel group or other entity seeking to overthrow a UN-recognized government, that every diamond export be accompanied by a Kimberley Process certificate and that no diamond is imported from, or exported to, a non-member of the scheme. This three-step plan is a simple description of the steps taken to ensure a chain of countries that deal exclusively with non-conflict diamonds. By restricting diamond revenues to government-approved sources, the Kimberley Process is neutral towards different governments.

The effectiveness of the process has been brought into question by organizations such as Global Witness (pulled out of the scheme on 5 December 2011) and IMPACT (pulled out on 14 December 2017), claiming it has failed in its purpose and does not provide markets with assurance that the diamonds are not conflict diamonds. Human Rights Watch has also argued that the Kimberley Process is too narrow in scope and does not adequately serve to eliminate other human rights concerns from the diamond production chain.

Administration and funding of the KPCS has been an ongoing question. Until 2011, there was no formal funding mechanism for KPCS administrative expenses, with some expenses borne by member countries and others borne by the country holding the chair position in a given year. In 2011, the KPCS Administrative Support Mechanism was approved to handle administrative tasks, supported by four industry organizations. In 2022, members voted to make Botswana the host of the Permanent Secretariat for KPCS, with costs shared by Botswana, as well as the World Diamond Council and KPCS member countries.

== History ==
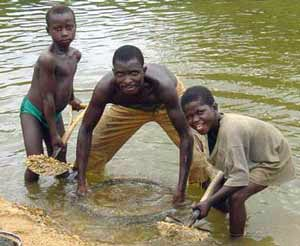
A man and two children sifting for diamonds in Sierra Leone in 2004

=== United Nations ===
The United Nations imposed sanctions against UNITA in 1998 through United Nations Security Council Resolution 1173; however investigators led by Robert Fowler presented the Fowler Report to the UN in March 2000, which detailed how the movement was able to continue financing its war efforts through the sale of diamonds on the international market. The UN wished to clamp down on this sanctions-breaking trade, but had limited powers of enforcement; the Fowler report therefore set out to name the countries, companies, government and individuals involved. This led to a meeting of diamond-producing and trading states from around the world in Kimberley, Northern Cape in May 2000. A culminating ministerial meeting followed during September in Pretoria, from which the KPCS originated.

In December 2000, the United Nations General Assembly adopted Resolution A/RES/55/56, supporting the creation of an international certification scheme for rough diamonds, and this was followed by support from the United Nations Security Council in its Resolution 1459 passed in January 2003. Every year since, the General Assembly has renewed its support for the KP – most recently in March 2018.

=== World Diamond Council involvement ===
The World Diamond Council is an industry trade group representing the diamond supply chain including representatives from diamond mining, manufacturing, trading and retail. It was established in response to concerns about blood diamonds. It was established in July 2000 in Antwerp, Belgium, after a joint meeting of the World Federation of Diamond Bourses, representing all the world's significant diamond trading centres, and the International Diamond Manufacturers Association, representing significant manufacturers. Its stated purpose is "to represent the diamond industry in the development and implementation of regulatory and voluntary systems to control the trade in diamonds embargoed by the United Nations or covered by the KPCS".

By November 2002, negotiations between governments, the international diamond industry and civil society organisations resulted in the creation of the KPCS. The KPCS document set out the requirements for controlling rough diamond production and trade.

The KPCS is credited as being instrumental toward dramatically reducing "conflict diamonds" to less than 1% of the world's diamond production today.

The World Diamond Council created a System of Warranties for diamonds, which has been endorsed by all KPCS participants. The Council has representation on all the Kimberley Process's working groups and is influential in determining its implementation and future reform.

=== Exclusions ===
In 2004, the Republic of the Congo was removed from the scheme because it was found unable to prove the origin of its gems, most of which were believed to have come from the neighbouring Democratic Republic of the Congo. For countries economically dependent on diamond exports, this can be a substantial punishment, as it disallows trade with much of the rest of the world. The Republic of the Congo's membership in the KPCS was reinstated at the scheme's plenary meeting in 2007.

In 2005, trade in diamonds from Côte d'Ivoire was prohibited. Ivorian diamonds and cocoa are considered conflict resources.

In 2008, Venezuela voluntarily removed itself from the KPCS, after it had been in non-compliance for several years. The nation ignored several attempts to communicate from Kimberley working groups, finally responding to an Angolan ambassador in 2007. Venezuela invited Kimberley officials to visit the nation, but this required authorization, and the deadline expired without further correspondence. Finally, Venezuela agreed to remove itself from the KPCS and work toward strengthening its infrastructure.

Côte d'Ivoire and Venezuela are still considered Kimberley Process members, but not Kimberley Process participants. As explained in the FAQ section of the Kimberley Process website, "Participants in the Kimberley Process (KP) are states or regional economic integration organisations (currently the European Community) that have met the minimum requirements of the Kimberley Process Certification Scheme (KPCS) and are, therefore, eligible to trade in rough diamonds with one another. The KPCS prohibits participants from trading with non-participants. Therefore, while the aforementioned countries still retain membership in the KPCS, they do not fulfill the requirements for participation, and thus cannot be called "participants".

In 2022, members debated whether Russian diamonds were conflict diamonds.

== Compliance ==
=== System of warranties ===
Under the World Diamond Council's System of Warranties, all buyers and sellers of both rough and polished diamonds must make the following affirmative statement on all invoices:

"The diamonds herein invoiced have been purchased from legitimate sources not involved in funding conflict and in compliance with United Nations resolutions. The seller hereby guarantees that these diamonds are conflict free, based on personal knowledge and/or written guarantees provided by the supplier of these diamonds."

It is considered a violation of the KPCS to issue a warranty declaration on a sales invoice unless it can be corroborated by warranty invoices received for purchases. Each company trading in diamonds must also keep records of the warranty invoices received and the warranty invoices issued when buying or selling diamonds. This flow of warranties in and out must be audited and reconciled on an annual basis by the company's auditors.

Industry self-regulation is built into the scheme, and the diamond industry organizations and their members have adopted the following principles of self-regulation:

- to trade only with companies that include warranty declarations on their invoices;
- to not buy diamonds from suspect sources or unknown suppliers, or which originate in countries that have not implemented the Kimberley Process Certification Scheme;
- to not buy diamonds from any sources that, after a legally binding due process system, have been found to have violated government regulations restricting the trade in conflict diamonds;
- to not buy diamonds in or from any region that is subject to an advisory by a governmental authority indicating that conflict diamonds are emanating from or available for sale in such region, unless diamonds have been exported from such region in compliance with the Kimberley Process Certification Scheme;
- to not knowingly buy or sell or assist others to buy or sell conflict diamonds;
- to ensure that all company employees that buy or sell diamonds within the diamond trade are well informed regarding trade resolutions and government regulations restricting the trade in conflict diamonds.

Failure to abide by these principles exposes the member to "internal penalties set by industry", or expulsion from industry organizations.

== Working procedure ==
The working procedure of the KPCS is done by the chair, elected on an annual basis at a plenary meeting. A working group on monitoring, works to ensure that each participant is implementing the scheme correctly. The working group reports to the chair. Other working groups include the technical working group (or working group of diamond experts) which reports on difficulties in implementation and proposes solutions, and the statistics working group, which reports diamond trading data.

While the process has been broadly welcomed by groups aiming to improve human rights in countries previously affected by conflict diamonds, such as Angola, some say it does not go far enough. For instance, Amnesty International says "[We] welcome the Kimberley Process as an important step to dealing with the problem of conflict diamonds. But until the diamond trade is subject to mandatory, impartial monitoring, there is still no effective guarantee that all conflict diamonds will be identified and removed from the market." Canadian aid group One Sky (funded in part by the Canadian government) concurs with Amnesty's view saying "If effectively implemented, the Kimberley Process will ensure that diamonds cannot be used to finance war and atrocities... However, without a system of expert, independent and periodic reviews of all countries, the overall process remains open to abuse." Fatal Transactions campaign's (started in 1998) founder Anne Jung in 2008 criticized KPCS for not being a legally binding agreement and suggested a revision of the scheme.

Another form of criticism by the African Diamond Council (ADC) is whether the Kimberley Process is realistically enforceable. There are many factors that can jeopardize the "officialdom of certificates and paperwork" from lack of enforcement on the ground to the secrecy in the diamond trading centers such as Antwerp. Human Rights Watch has also found that there is little independent monitoring of compliance with the Kimberley Process, and few penalties for violations.

=== Working groups ===
KPCS has established a number of working groups for carrying out its programs. As of 2019, it had seven working groups: Working Group of Diamond Experts (WGDE), Working Group on Monitoring (WGM), Working Group on Statistics (WGS), Working Group on Artisanal & Alluvial Production (WGAAP), Committee on Participation and Chairmanship (CPC), Committee on Rules and Procedures (CRP) and Ad Hoc Committee on Reform and Review (AHCRR).

== Current membership ==
As of 1 January 2024, there were 59 participants in the KPCS representing 85 countries, with the European Union counting as a single participant. The participants include all major rough diamond producing, exporting and importing countries. The following is a list of participant countries with their year of entry (and re-entry, as appropriate) in brackets.

- Angola (2003)
- Armenia (2003)
- Australia (2003)
- Bangladesh (2006)
- Belarus (2003)
- Botswana (2003)
- Brazil (2003)
- Cambodia (2012)
- Cameroon (2012)
- Canada (2003)
- Central African Republic (2003, suspended 2013-2015)
- China (2003)
- Democratic Republic of the Congo (2003)
- Côte d'Ivoire (2003)
- European Union (2003)
- Eswatini (2011)
- Gabon (2018)
- Ghana (2003)
- Guinea (2003)
- Guyana (2003)
- India (2003)
- Indonesia (2005)
- Israel (2003)
- Japan (2003)
- Kazakhstan (2012)
- Kyrgyzstan (2021)
- Laos (2003)
- Lebanon (2003/2005)
- Lesotho (2003)
- Liberia (2007)
- Malaysia (2003)
- Mali (2013)
- Mauritius (2003)
- Mexico (2008)
- Mozambique (2021)
- Namibia (2003)
- New Zealand (2006)
- Norway (2003)
- Panama (2012)
- Qatar (2021)
- Republic of the Congo (2003/2007)
- Russia (2003)
- Sierra Leone (2003)
- Singapore (2004)
- South Africa (2003)
- South Korea (2003)
- Sri Lanka (2003)
- Switzerland (2003)
- Tanzania (2003)
- Thailand (2003)
- Togo (2003)
- Turkey (2007)
- Ukraine (2003)
- United Arab Emirates (2003)
- United Kingdom (2021, previously a member as part of the European Union)
- United States (2003)
- Venezuela (2003, withdrew in 2008, re-admitted in 2016)
- Vietnam (2003)
- Zimbabwe (2003)

=== Applicants ===
The following countries have expressed interest in joining the KPCS, but have yet to satisfy the minimum requirements:

- Azerbaijan
- Burkina Faso
- Pakistan

=== Waiver ===
The World Trade Organization (WTO) in December 2006 approved a waiver for the KPCS while recognizing the importance and effectiveness of the KPCS.

== Chairs ==
The chair oversees the implementation of the program, the operations of the working groups and committees, and general administration. The chair rotates annually. The current chair of KPCS is the nation that held the position of vice chair the previous year. The following is a list of the Kimberley Process Certification Scheme's chairs and vice chairs:

- 2003: South Africa; vice chair Canada
- 2004: Canada; vice chair Russian Federation
- 2005: Russian Federation; vice chair Botswana
- 2006: Botswana; vice chair European Commission
- 2007: European Commission; vice chair India
- 2008: India; vice chair Namibia
- 2009: Namibia; vice chair Israel
- 2010: Israel, Boaz Hirsch; vice chair DRC
- 2011: DRC, Mathieu Yamba; vice chair United States
- 2012: United States, Ambassador Gillian Milovanovic; vice chair South Africa
- 2013: South Africa, vice chair China
- 2014: China, vice chair Angola
- 2015: Angola, vice chair United Arab Emirates
- 2016: United Arab Emirates, vice chair Australia
- 2017: Australia, vice chair European Union
- 2018: European Union, vice chair India
- 2019: India, vice chair Russian Federation
- 2020: No chairmanship due to Covid-19
- 2021: Russian Federation, vice chair Botswana
- 2022: Botswana, vice chair Zimbabwe
- 2024: United Arab Emirates

The DRC's position as the 2011 KPCS chair is notable, in that it had been a known source of conflict diamonds and other minerals in recent years.

== Statistics ==
KPCS emphasizes collecting and publishing data relating to actual mining and international trade in diamonds. Member countries are required to officially submit statistics that can be verified through audit. Also, all member countries are required to produce and submit an Annual Report on the trade in diamonds. According to the Working Group on Statistics (WGS) of KPCS, in 2006, the KPCS monitored $35.7 billion in rough diamond exports representing more than 480 million carats. The number of Certificates issued by KPCS members was 55,000.

In 2014, 100 Reporters published an article showing how the use of KP certificates had allowed for the publication to identify transfer pricing manipulation in South Africa's trade of rough diamond exports, detailing "Most imported diamonds appear to be re-exported uncut and unpolished. While imports make up relatively small volume, or carats, they drastically increase the value of rough diamond exports. Subtracting the values and volume of imported diamonds shown on South Africa's K.P. certificates from corresponding exports, the actual price per carat of rough diamonds being exported for the first time falls dramatically."

The article revealed that when, "asked about the anomalies in reported trade figures for diamonds under the Kimberley Process (K.P.) in South Africa, where De Beers is a dominant player, [Lynette] Gould, [head of media relations for De Beers], responded, "The primary purpose of the K.P. process (or the issuing of the certificates at least) is for Governments to certify the origin of diamonds, not to keep track of the volume and value of diamonds imported or exported."

=== Annual report ===
Annual reporting by all KPCS members is a component of peer review mechanism established by KPCS. In the United States, for example, all companies that buy, sell, and ship rough diamonds must submit an annual report via email to the State Department, deadline April 1. The report must include the company's contact information and a detailed breakdown of the total carat weight and value in U.S. dollars of rough diamonds imported, exported, and stockpiled (still in inventory) for the previous calendar year. These are also sorted by HTS codes for unsorted (gem and industrial) rough diamonds, sorted rough industrial diamonds, and sorted rough gem diamonds – the latter of which is most likely to be polished into finished stones and jewelry for retail sale, while industrial diamonds are most likely to be used in cutting and drilling tools. Failure to submit this annual report in a timely fashion could result in a fine up to $10,000. If found to be in willful violation, the convicted offender could be fined up to $50,000 and sentenced to up to ten years in prison.

== Criticism ==
Global Witness is a London-based NGO, a key member of the KPCS and was one of the first organizations to bring the issue of 'conflict diamonds' to international attention. They state that a report they wrote, "A Rough Trade", was partial inspiration for the film Blood Diamond. According to Global Witness, the Kimberley Process has ultimately failed to stem the flow of conflict diamonds, leading them to abandon the scheme in 2011.

In December 2013, the World Policy Journal published an investigative report by journalists Khadija Sharife and John Grobler. This showed that a minimum of $3.5 billion in KP-certified diamonds from Angola and Democratic Republic of Congo (DRC) had been moved through KP-certified tax havens such as Dubai and Switzerland. This was in collaboration with self-regulating 'KP-approved' governments including Angola; arms dealers such as Arkadi Gaydamak, diamond magnate Lev Leviev and certain international banks.

The authors concluded that tax havens should not be allowed to handle resource revenues because they provide "the legal and financial-secrecy infrastructure enabling illicit activities, while the former struggle to generate revenue for citizens' needs". Under-invoicing and other illicit manipulation of reported income or tax avoidance were excluded from the definition of "conflict diamond" used by the KP, they note, and this "has enabled a 99 percent clean diamond industry to exist largely because the real violence of the industry is whitewashed, ignored, or excluded entirely from the framework – the criminal portion of which continues to exist entirely on the periphery."

In 2013, US investigative platform 100 Reporters released another Khadija Sharife investigate through Central Intelligence Organization (CIO) documents, showing $3 billion in diamond revenues used to rig the Zimbabwean elections.

In June 2009, Ian Smillie of the Canadian-based NGO, Partnership Africa Canada (PAC), one of the founder members of the Kimberley Process resigned his position accusing the regulator of failing to regulate and saying he could no longer contribute to the "pretense that failure is success".

Another founding member of the process, UK-based NGO Global Witness said, "Despite having all tools in place, the Scheme was failing effectively to address issues of non-compliance, smuggling, money laundering and human rights abuses in the world's ... diamond fields". The scheme came under further criticism from Global Witness and Partnership Africa Canada in June 2010 after the Kimberley Monitor appointed to review diamond mining conditions in Zimbabwe recommended that the country be allowed to sell diamonds as conflict-free from its contested Marange diamond fields in Chiadzwa. For the first time the two NGOs jointly called for a redefined classification for conflict diamonds.

In August 2010, another key draftsman of the KP, and also Africa's highest-ranking diamond official, African Diamond Council (ADC) and ADPA chairman M'zée Fula Ngenge, demoralized KP supporters by persuading African diamond-producing nations to renounce their support for the scheme. Ngenge blasted the KP for its ongoing ineffectiveness, stating that "the system has failed to thwart trading of diamonds mined as a result of human suffering."

Ahead of this denunciation, the ADC unleashed a distressing TV infomercial that exposed internal problems at the front end of the African diamond industry. The broadcast was not only a huge boost for the ADC, it proved to be an enormous setback for the Kimberley Process and ultimately ended De Beers’ ascendancy on the African continent.

In December 2010 Time Magazine published a piece discussing the newly established rough diamond trade in Zimbabwe. The article questioned the legitimacy of the Kimberley Process, stating that it was unable to prevent Zimbabwean conflict diamonds from entering the market.

On 11 August 2011, a BBC radio documentary titled "Zimbabwe's Diamond Fields" repeated an interview with representatives of the Kimberley Process claiming officials were unaware of the tortures and killings exposed in the documentary. Official stated they were only aware of incidents uncovered by their brief visits to the field, implying that they were not staffed to do in-depth investigations.

Global Witness walked out on KP in December 2011. The human rights watchdog group has stated that in recent times, the governments of Zimbabwe, Côte d'Ivoire and Venezuela have all dishonored, breached and exploited the system without bearing any consequential penalties for their infringements.

== See also ==
- African Diamond Producers Association, aka African Diamond Council
- Blood Diamond (film): Film scenes are located in Sierra Leone; the end titles mention the Kimberley Process
- Clean Diamond Trade Act
- Conflict resource
- Diamonds as an investment
- Energy in Angola
- Fair trade certification
- Resource curse
