= United Nations Security Council Resolution 1171 =

UN Security Council Resolution 1171
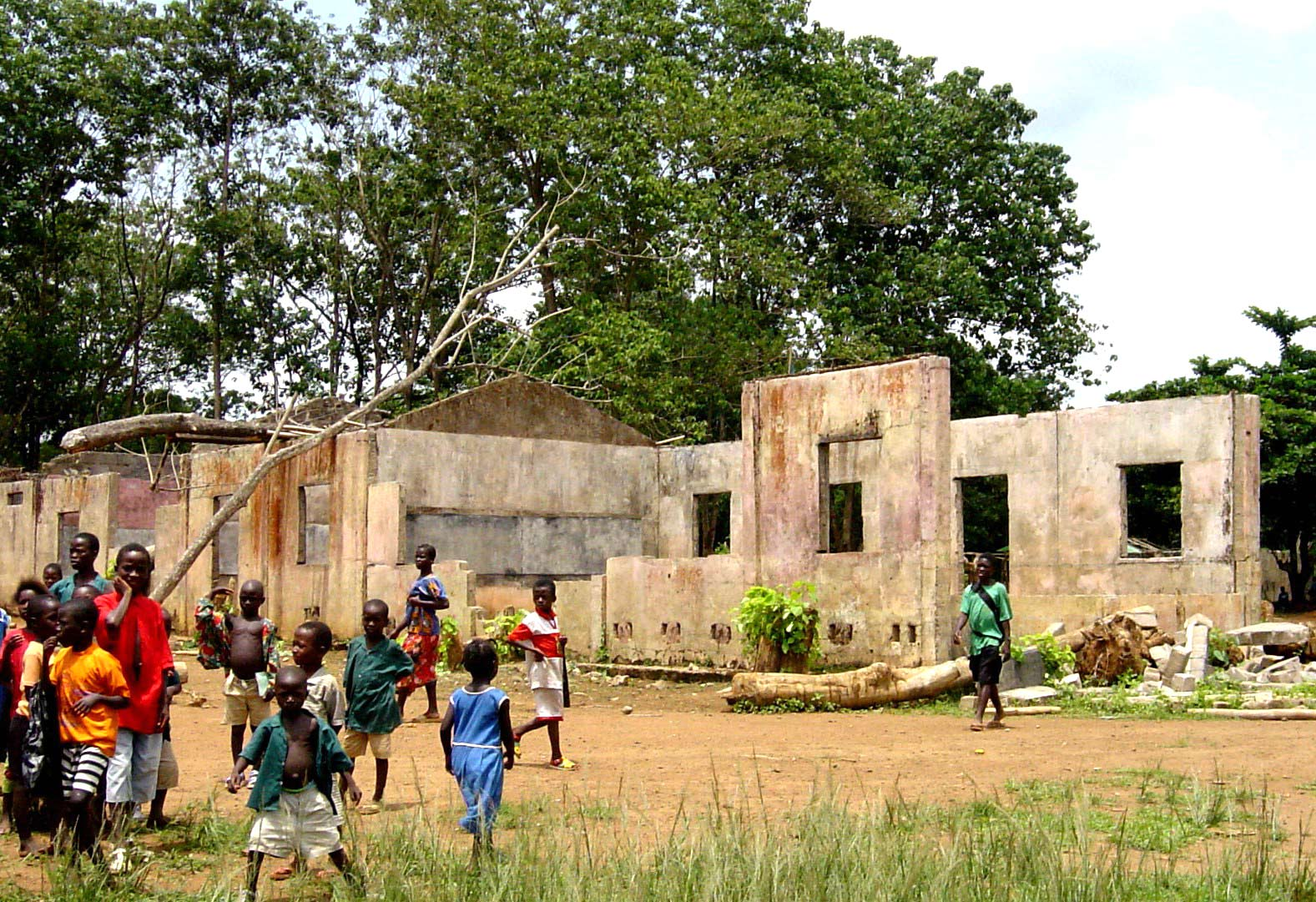
- School destroyed during the civil war in Sierra Leone
- Date: 5 June 1998
- Meeting no.: 3,889
- Code: S/RES/1171 (Document)
- Subject: The situation in Sierra Leone
- Voting summary: 15 voted for; None voted against; None abstained
- Result: Adopted

Security Council composition
- Permanent members: China; France; Russia; United Kingdom; United States
- Non-permanent members: Bahrain; Brazil; Costa Rica; Gabon; Gambia; Japan; Kenya; Portugal; Slovenia; Sweden

United Nations Security Council resolution 1171 is a United Nation Security Council resolution that was adopted unanimously on 5 June 1998. After recalling resolutions 1132 (1997), 1156 (1998) and 1162 (1998) on the situation in Sierra Leone, the council, acting under Chapter VII of the United Nations Charter, terminated the arms embargo against the Government of Sierra Leone.

The Security Council welcomed the efforts of the Sierra Leone government to restore peace and security in the country, including the democratic process and national reconciliation. It deplored resistance to the government by rebels and demanded that they put an end to their resistance and lay down their arms.

Acting under Chapter VII of the United Nations Charter, the Council terminated the arms embargo against the government. It decided to continue to prevent the sale of weapons and materiel to non-governmental forces by requesting all states to continue to prohibit sales of weapons to Sierra Leone except through named points of entry. The restrictions would also not apply to the Economic Community of West African States Monitoring Group (ECOMOG) peacekeeping force or United Nations personnel.

The resolution then imposed a travel ban on leading members of the former military junta and Revolutionary United Front. All measures would be terminated once the authority of the Sierra Leone government was restored in the country and all non-governmental forces were disarmed and demobilised. Finally, the Secretary-General was requested to report within three and six months since the adoption of the current resolution regarding the sanctions and progress made by the government of Sierra Leone and non-governmental forces.

== See also ==
- History of Sierra Leone
- List of United Nations Security Council Resolutions 1101 to 1200 (1997–1998)
- Sierra Leone Civil War
