= United Nations Security Council Resolution 1132 =

UN Security Council Resolution 1132
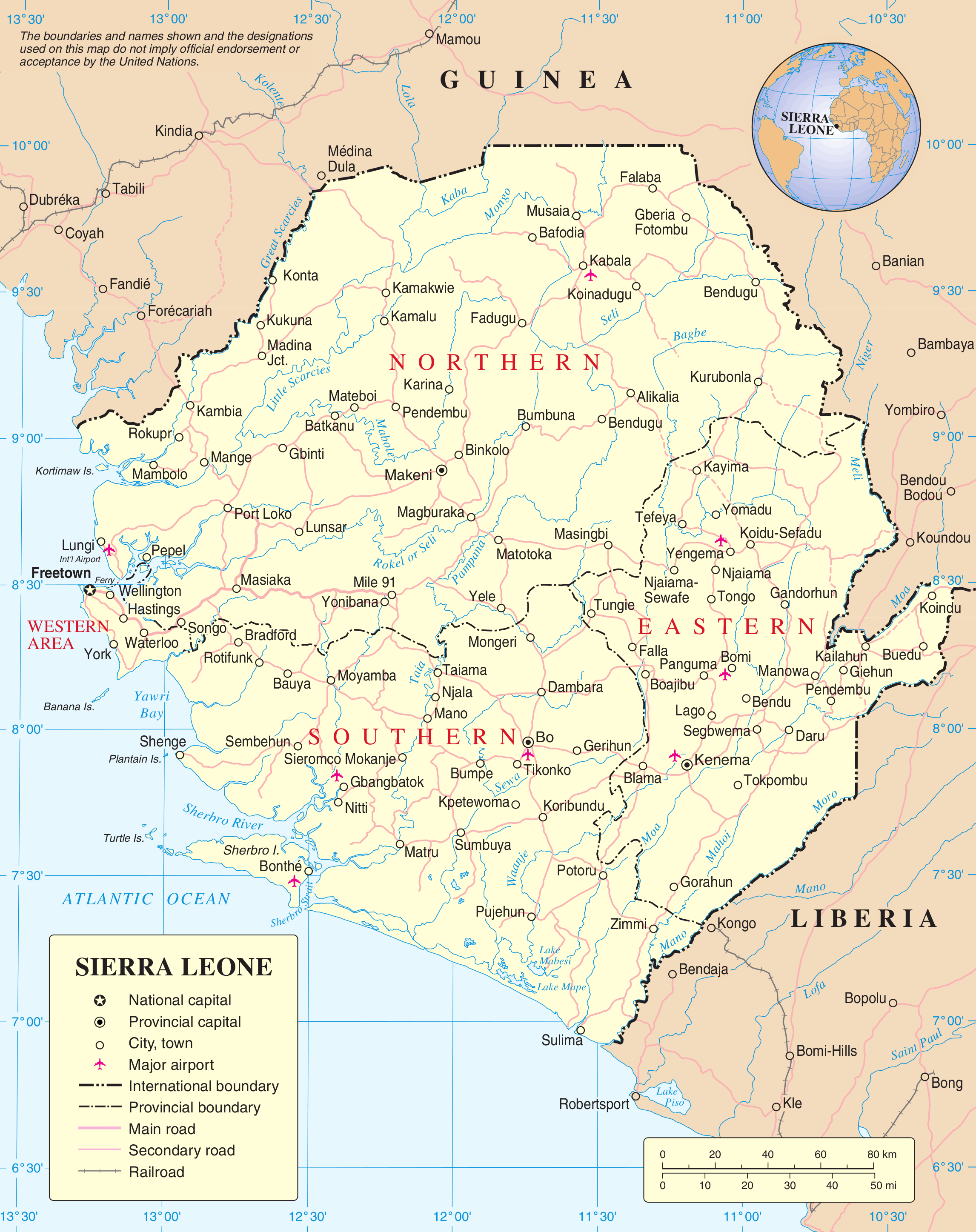
- Sierra Leone
- Date: 8 October 1997
- Meeting no.: 3,822
- Code: S/RES/1132 (Document)
- Subject: The situation in Sierra Leone
- Voting summary: 15 voted for; None voted against; None abstained
- Result: Adopted

Security Council composition
- Permanent members: China; France; Russia; United Kingdom; United States
- Non-permanent members: Chile; Costa Rica; Egypt; Guinea-Bissau; Japan; Kenya; South Korea; Poland; Portugal; Sweden

United Nations Security Council resolution 1132, adopted on 8 October 1997, after expressing concern at the situation in Sierra Leone, the council, acting under Chapter VII of the United Nations Charter, imposed an oil and arms embargo on the country.

== Background ==
A series of military governments held power in Sierra Leone and there was violence in the country and at the border with Liberia. The Revolutionary United Front (RUF) established a military government, however due to international pressure and popular demands held elections in 1996, agreeing to hand over power to a civilian government. Ahmad Tejan Kabbah won the election, and the Abidjan Peace Accord was signed with the RUF and Sierra Leone People's Party. The agreement later broke down, and the civilian government was toppled and was replaced with a military junta. It was later removed by the Economic Community of West African States Monitoring Group forces and civilian government was restored. After further violence, the civil war ended in 2002.

== Resolution ==
The president of the security council had earlier condemned the coup d'état in Sierra Leone and the Economic Community of West African States (ECOWAS) had imposed sanctions on the junta. The Abidjan Agreement was reaffirmed as providing a basis for peace, security and reconciliation. It deplored the junta's refusal to take steps to restore the democratically elected government, and was concerned about the level of violence in the country.

Acting under Chapter VII, the security council demanded that the junta relinquish power and to cease all attacks and violence in the country, so that humanitarian aid could be delivered to the civilian population. Sanctions were then placed on Sierra Leone military government, which included a travel ban on members of the junta and their immediate families and an oil and arms embargo. A committee was established to manage those sanctions, suggest ways to improve their effectiveness and report periodically to the council on the implementation of the sanctions. Any oil for humanitarian purposes had to be approved by the committee. It also authorised, under Chapter VIII of the United Nations Charter, ECOWAS and the legitimate government of Sierra Leone to co-operate with the implementation of the current resolution.

It was then decided that, if the measures had not been terminated within 180 days, a thorough review would be undertaken, including on whether the junta had complied with the current resolution. The Secretary-General Kofi Annan was requested to submit a report within 15 days of the adoption of the current resolution detailing the humanitarian situation in Sierra Leone and compliance from the junta, and thereafter every 60 days.

== See also ==
- History of Sierra Leone
- List of United Nations Security Council Resolutions 1101 to 1200 (1997–1998)
