= Blood diamond =

Diamond mined in conflict areas

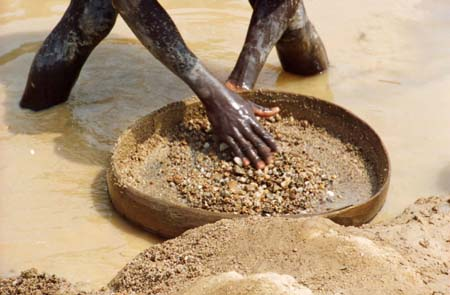
Panning for diamonds in Sierra Leone

Diamond mining in Sierra Leone

Blood diamonds, also known as conflict diamonds and less commonly as hot diamonds, are diamonds mined or traded in areas affected by armed conflict and used to finance rebel movements, insurgencies, or other armed groups. The term became widely associated with diamonds mined in the late 20th and early 21st centuries during civil wars in Angola, Ivory Coast, Sierra Leone, Liberia, Guinea, and Guinea-Bissau. Blood diamonds are also frequently smuggled by organized crime syndicates for sale on the black market. According to the Kimberley Process, 2023 global trade in rough diamonds totaled approximately 112 million carats. Similar terms, such as conflict resources and conflict minerals, are used for other natural resources exploited under comparable conditions.

== Financing conflict ==
Diamonds and other valuable natural resources can sustain armed conflict by giving armed groups access to revenue. Political geographer Philippe Le Billon argues that resources may prolong or motivate warfare when they create lucrative opportunities for groups that might otherwise lack access to finance. In this context, global commodity prices are an inadequate proxy for a resource's value to armed groups. Location, method of extraction, and access to markets are also important. Diamonds are especially attractive because they have a high value relative to their weight and size, making them portable and comparatively easy to smuggle.

The type of diamond deposit also affects its role in conflict. Deep mining for gold, kimberlite diamonds, or other minerals usually requires capital-intensive facilities and technical expertise. Alluvial diamonds, by contrast, can often be extracted with simple tools once the surrounding land is controlled. This makes alluvial deposits easier for rebel groups or other armed actors to exploit. Research on Botswana and Sierra Leone has linked their differing experiences of stability and conflict to the distinction between primary and secondary diamond deposits.

Armed groups may also raise funds through future claims to natural resources. Michael Ross describes these arrangements as "booty futures": agreements in which rebels or governments obtain money in exchange for future rights to exploit resources. Ross cites examples involving diamonds and oil in conflicts in Sierra Leone, Liberia, Angola, Equatorial Guinea, the Republic of the Congo, and the Democratic Republic of the Congo. Such arrangements can allow resources to finance conflict even before they are physically controlled or extracted.

These characteristics have led campaigners, policymakers, and diplomats to support regulatory measures intended to prevent natural resources from financing armed conflict. In the twelve years after the end of the Cold War, the United Nations Security Council passed resolutions imposing sanctions on resource exporters in ten conflicts.

== History ==
The conflict diamond trade became a major international concern in the late 20th century, although estimates of its scale have varied over time. Reports cited by Partnership Africa Canada estimated that as much as 21% of global diamond production in the 1980s was sold for illegal or unethical purposes, with 19% specifically conflict-related. The prominence of diamonds in conflicts in Angola, Sierra Leone, and the Democratic Republic of the Congo contributed to international efforts to regulate the rough diamond trade. The Kimberley Process began in 2000 and the Kimberley Process Certification Scheme came into effect in 2003.

=== Angola ===
During the Angolan Civil War, UNITA used diamonds to help finance its war against the Angolan government. The United Nations Security Council imposed sanctions on UNITA, including measures intended to restrict its trade in diamonds. Despite these sanctions, UNITA continued to sell or trade diamonds to finance its war effort.

The United Nations appointed Canadian ambassador Robert Fowler to investigate how the sanctions were being circumvented. The resulting Fowler Report, released in 2000, identified countries, organizations, and individuals involved in sanctions violations and drew international attention to the role of diamonds in financing armed conflict. The report contributed to further Security Council action, including United Nations Security Council Resolution 1295, which was adopted on 18 April 2000 and concerned sanctions against UNITA.

=== Ivory Coast ===
Ivory Coast (Côte d'Ivoire) had a small diamond industry. Partnership Africa Canada reported that although the industry had closed in the mid-1980s, Belgian records showed substantial diamond imports attributed to Ivory Coast in the mid-1990s. During the conflict in Ivory Coast, concerns over illicit diamond exports led the United Nations Security Council to impose a ban on imports of rough diamonds from the country in 2005. The ban was lifted in April 2014 after the Council noted progress toward implementation of the Kimberley Process Certification Scheme. Despite the 2005 UN embargo, diamond mining and smuggling reportedly continued in rebel-held areas. A 2013 U.S. Geological Survey report found that artisanal, or small-scale, diamond mining had continued in Ivory Coast during the embargo, particularly in the diamond-producing areas of Séguéla and Tortiya.

=== Democratic Republic of Congo ===
The Democratic Republic of the Congo, known as Zaire until 1997, has been affected by armed conflicts in which diamonds and other natural resources helped finance armed groups. Diamonds were among the mineral resources linked to the financing and prolongation of the conflict that began in the Democratic Republic of the Congo in 1998.

The Democratic Republic of the Congo has participated in the Kimberley Process Certification Scheme since 2003. Concerns have nevertheless persisted about the exploitation of natural resources in the country, including diamonds, and their role in sustaining conflict.

=== Liberia ===
Liberia experienced two civil wars between 1989 and 2003. During the presidency of Charles Taylor, the United Nations accused Liberia of supporting the Revolutionary United Front (RUF) in neighbouring Sierra Leone, including through the trade in diamonds. In 2001, the United Nations Security Council imposed sanctions on Liberia, including a ban on rough diamond imports, after finding that diamonds were helping to fuel the conflict in Sierra Leone. Separate reports also alleged that members of al-Qaeda bought diamonds in Liberia and from the RUF in Sierra Leone as a way to move assets into high-value commodities after some of its assets were frozen.

Taylor left office in August 2003 and was later tried by the Special Court for Sierra Leone. In April 2012, he was convicted of crimes including war crimes and crimes against humanity, and in May 2012 was sentenced to 50 years in prison. His son Charles McArther Emmanuel, also known as Chuckie Taylor or Roy Belfast Jr was also sentenced to 97 years in federal prison on multiple counts of torture, conspiracy to torture, and firearm violations on January 2009.

The United Nations Security Council lifted its ban on Liberian diamond exports in April 2007, after Liberia made progress toward joining the Kimberley Process Certification Scheme. The United States Department of Labor has continued to list diamonds from Liberia among goods it has reason to believe are produced with child labor.

=== Sierra Leone ===
The Sierra Leone Civil War lasted from 1991 to 2002 and caused widespread civilian suffering, including killings, mutilation, sexual violence, torture, abduction, and the recruitment of child soldiers. Much of the violence was carried out by the Revolutionary United Front (RUF), which became notorious for attacks on civilians, including the amputation of limbs.

Diamonds played a central role in financing the conflict. The RUF gained control of diamond-mining areas and used revenue from diamond sales to fund its operations. In 2000, the United Nations Security Council imposed sanctions on the direct or indirect import of rough diamonds from Sierra Leone unless they were controlled by the government through a certificate-of-origin regime. The sanctions were lifted in 2003 after the government strengthened controls over diamond exports.

After the war, Sierra Leone sought to rebuild its diamond sector and increase the benefits of mining for local communities. However, campaign groups argued that diamond-producing areas, including Kono District, had seen limited development despite decades of mining and increased official diamond exports.

=== Republic of Congo ===
The Republic of the Congo (Congo-Brazzaville) was removed from the Kimberley Process in 2004 after it was unable to account for large quantities of rough diamonds it was exporting despite limited domestic production. The country was readmitted in 2007 after authorities strengthened controls over the diamond trade.

=== Zimbabwe ===
Diamonds from Zimbabwe's Marange diamond fields became a source of controversy within the Kimberley Process Certification Scheme, particularly over whether abuses in the area fell within the scheme's definition of conflict diamonds. In 2010, Kimberley Process members reached an agreement allowing limited exports from Marange under monitoring, although human rights groups continued to raise concerns about abuses, smuggling, and military involvement in the fields.

=== Central African Republic ===
The Central African Republic (CAR) is a significant producer of rough diamonds, and diamonds have played an important role in the country's conflicts.

Following the 2001 Central African Republic coup attempt and subsequent unrest, Congolese rebel leader Jean-Pierre Bemba assisted in suppressing the rebellion. He was later accused of using the CAR to launder Congolese conflict diamonds, helping to finance the continuation of the Second Congo War.

The CAR was a founding member of the Kimberley Process Certification Scheme (KPCS) in 2003, but was suspended for two months that year after General François Bozizé took power in the 2003 Central African Republic coup d'état. The suspension was lifted after Bozizé gave assurances that the country would work to reduce the trade in conflict diamonds. The CAR subsequently established BEDCOR, a government body responsible for certifying diamonds as compliant with the KPCS, in conjunction with the USAID Property Rights and Artisanal Diamond Development Project. The initiative was not fully successful, and insurgent groups in the country continued to fund operations using conflict diamonds.

Following the rise of the Séléka alliance during the Central African Republic Civil War, the Kimberley Process suspended the CAR from the KPCS. A further administrative decision on 11 July 2014 was intended to reduce diamond smuggling from the country.

In 2015, the Kimberley Process allowed a partial resumption of diamond exports from approved areas, and legal diamond production gradually resumed. However, concerns about conflict diamonds have continued. The Wagner Group, whose forces entered the country in 2018, has been linked to conflict minerals, and illicit diamond smuggling into Cameroon has remained a concern. At the same time, restrictions under the KPCS reduced demand for illicit CAR diamonds, leading some rebel groups to turn instead to gold mining as a source of income.

== Conflict diamond campaign ==
Global Witness was one of the first organizations to document the link between diamonds and conflicts in Africa in its 1998 report A Rough Trade. With the adoption of United Nations Security Council Resolution 1173 in 1998, the United Nations identified the conflict diamond issue as a source of war funding.

The Fowler Report in 2000 described how UNITA financed its military activities through the diamond trade. It contributed to the adoption of United Nations Security Council Resolution 1295 and to the meeting of southern African diamond-producing countries in Kimberley, South Africa, where participants discussed measures to halt the trade in conflict diamonds and reassure buyers that diamonds had not contributed to violence. In this resolution, the Security Council wrote:

Welcomes the proposal that a meeting of experts be convened for the purpose of devising a system of controls to facilitate the implementation of the measures contained in Resolution 1173 (1998), including arrangements that would allow for increased transparency and accountability in the control of diamonds from their point of origin to the bourses, emphasizes that it is important that, in devising such controls, every effort be made to avoid inflicting collateral damage on the legitimate diamond trade, and welcomes the intention of the Republic of South Africa to host a relevant conference this year.

=== Kimberley Process Certification Scheme ===
On July 19, 2000, the World Diamond Congress in Antwerp adopted a resolution intended to strengthen the diamond industry's ability to block sales of conflict diamonds. The resolution called for an international certification system for diamond imports and exports, legislation requiring countries to accept only officially sealed packages of diamonds, criminal penalties for trafficking in conflict diamonds, and a ban from the diamond bourses of the World Federation of Diamond Bourses for individuals found trading in conflict diamonds.

The Kimberley Process was initially led by South Africa, with Canada as vice-chair. Since then, a new chair and vice-chair country have been elected each year. The system is intended to track rough diamonds from mine to market and regulate their export, import, and sale. Kimberley Process participants are not allowed to trade rough diamonds with non-participants. Before rough diamonds are exported, a Kimberley certificate must accompany the shipment to verify its origin.

On January 17–18, 2001, diamond industry figures convened and formed the World Diamond Council. The new organization sought to develop a process by which rough diamonds could be certified as coming from non-conflict sources.

The KPCS was approved by the United Nations on March 13, 2002. In November 2002, after two years of negotiations between governments, diamond producers, and non-government organizations, the Kimberley Process Certification Scheme was created.

The KPCS was intended to curtail the flow of conflict diamonds, help stabilize fragile countries, and support their development. By making illicit trade more difficult, the scheme brought larger volumes of diamonds into legal export channels. This increased revenues for some governments and helped them address development challenges. For instance, around $125 million worth of diamonds were legally exported from Sierra Leone in 2006, compared with almost none at the end of the 1990s.

=== Shortcomings and criticism ===
Critics have argued that the KPCS has failed to stem the flow of conflict diamonds, leading key proponent Global Witness to leave the scheme in 2011 after exports from Zimbabwe's Marange diamond field were reapproved. The organization also cited alleged failures to cut off conflict diamonds from Ivory Coast and to address alleged rule breaking by Venezuela. In addition, critics argue that KPCS certification does not guarantee that diamonds are conflict-free. They have pointed to corruption among officials in some diamond-producing countries, including allegations that officials accepted bribes in exchange for paperwork declaring that conflict diamonds are KPCS-certified.

=== Transparency ===
The Kimberley system seeks to increase government transparency by requiring participating states to keep records of the diamonds they export and import, including their value. In theory, these records would allow governments and the public to track diamond revenues and hold officials accountable for how public funds are used. However, non-compliance by countries such as Venezuela has limited this accountability.

Traceability technologies have also been proposed as a way to improve transparency beyond paper-based certification. Research involving Materialytics has reported that laser-induced breakdown spectroscopy can be used to determine diamond provenance. However, critics argue that consumers cannot always determine whether diamonds purchased online are conflict-free.

== Policy responses ==
=== American policy ===
On January 18, 2001, President Bill Clinton issued Executive Order 13194, which prohibited the importation of rough diamonds from Sierra Leone into the United States in accordance with UN resolutions. On May 22, 2001, President George W. Bush issued Executive Order 13213, which banned the importation of rough diamonds from Liberia into the United States. The United Nations had identified Liberia as a transit point for conflict diamonds from Sierra Leone.

The United States enacted the Clean Diamond Trade Act (CDTA) on April 25, 2003, and implemented it on July 29, 2003, through Executive Order 13312. The CDTA provided the legal basis for implementing the KPCS in the United States. Its implementation was important to the KPCS because the United States was the largest consumer market for diamonds. The CDTA states: "As the consumer of a majority of the world's supply of diamonds, the United States has an obligation to help sever the link between diamonds and conflict and press for implementation of an effective solution."

The United States Department of State coordinates U.S. implementation of the Kimberley Process through its Office of Multilateral Trade Affairs, which represents the United States in Kimberley Process meetings and oversees the U.S. Kimberley Process Authority.

=== Canadian policy ===
During the 1990s, diamond-rich areas were discovered in northern Canada, and Canada became an important participant in the diamond industry. Partnership Africa Canada was created in 1986 to support development initiatives in Africa. It was also involved in the Diamond Development Initiative, which sought to improve conditions for artisanal diamond miners and build on the Kimberley Process.

The KPCS was initiated in May 2000 by South Africa, with Canada as a major supporter of the scheme. Canada later passed several laws intended to help stop the trade in conflict diamonds. The laws address the import, export, and transit of rough diamonds. In December 2002, the Export and Import of Rough Diamonds Act was passed by the Canadian government, which established controls on the import, export and transport of rough diamonds through Canada. The Act makes the Kimberley Process the minimum requirement for certifying rough diamonds, and requires a certificate for all shipments. This certificate, known as the Canadian Certificate, allows officials to seize shipments that do not meet the requirements of the Act.

The Government of the Northwest Territories also has a certification program for diamonds mined, cut, and polished in the Northwest Territories. Canadian diamonds are tracked from the mine through the refining process to the retail jeweler with a unique diamond identification number (DIN) laser-inscribed on the diamond's girdle. To obtain this certificate, the diamond must be cut and polished in the Northwest Territories.

== Technology response ==
Technical services have emerged that may help track diamond movement across borders. In July 2016, IBM launched a blockchain-based service for tracking high-value or highly regulated items through a supply chain. Everledger used the system to record the movement of diamonds from mines to jewelry stores.

In addition, the rise of lab-grown diamonds has presented an alternative to mined diamonds. Lab-grown diamonds are chemically and physically identical to mined diamonds, but are marketed as avoiding some of the ethical and environmental concerns associated with traditional mining.

== In popular culture ==
- "Diamonds from Sierra Leone" is a Grammy-winning song by American rapper Kanye West about blood diamonds in Sierra Leone. The remix version includes verses about the blood diamond trade and the Western public's lack of awareness of diamonds linked to the conflict.
- The Walker, Texas Ranger episode "Blood Diamonds" from the final season involves Trivette posing as a deceased diamond smuggler and rebel from Uganda to help catch an arms dealer supplying weapons to rebels in exchange for conflict diamonds. The entirety of the episode is later revealed to be a vivid nightmare experienced by Alex.
- Conflict diamonds are a central plot point in the James Bond film Die Another Day (2002).
- The film Lord of War (2005), starring Nicolas Cage and Eamonn Walker, includes a scene in which diamonds are exchanged for weapons in Sierra Leone.
- The origins of the KPCS were dramatized in Ed Zwick's motion picture Blood Diamond (2006), starring Leonardo DiCaprio and Djimon Hounsou. The film helped publicize controversy surrounding conflict diamonds and raised awareness of West African involvement in the diamond trade.
- The CSI: Miami episode "Man Down" (2007) involves the trafficking of African blood diamonds.
- The CSI: NY episode "Not What It Looks Like" begins with a jewelry store robbery and later involves a blood diamond stolen during the crime.
- The Law & Order episode "Soldier of Fortune" (2001) involves the murder of a diamond broker connected to blood diamonds from Sierra Leone and a Swiss diamond company.
- Danish filmmaker Mads Brügger's documentary Ambassadøren (2011, in English: "The Ambassador") addresses the trade in diplomatic passports and blood diamonds.
- In the turn-based strategy game Diamond Trust of London, players compete to extract diamonds from Angola before the implementation of the Kimberley Process.
- Blood Diamonds is a thriller fiction book by Jon Land; ISBN 0-765-30226-8.
- The Hawaii Five-0 (2010) episode "Kalele" revolves around the smuggling of conflict diamonds.
- The 2009 Tamil movie Ayan portrays an insurgent group in the Democratic Republic of the Congo selling blood diamonds to international buyers to purchase AK-47s.
- The video game Far Cry 2 uses blood diamonds as currency and as a plot point in the main story.
- The video games Grand Theft Auto IV, Grand Theft Auto: The Lost and Damned, and Grand Theft Auto: The Ballad of Gay Tony include missions involving blood diamonds traded on the black market.
- The 2019 film Uncut Gems features blood diamonds being traded on the black market.

== See also ==
- List of diamonds
