= United Nations Security Council Resolution 890 =

UN Security Council Resolution 890
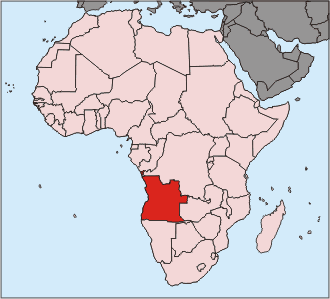
- Angola in Africa
- Date: 15 December 1993
- Meeting no.: 3,323
- Code: S/RES/890 (Document)
- Subject: Angola
- Voting summary: 15 voted for; None voted against; None abstained
- Result: Adopted

Security Council composition
- Permanent members: China; France; Russia; United Kingdom; United States
- Non-permanent members: Brazil; Cape Verde; Djibouti; Hungary; Japan; Morocco; New Zealand; Pakistan; Spain; Venezuela

United Nations Security Council resolution 890, adopted unanimously on 15 December 1993, after reaffirming resolutions 696 (1991), 747 (1992), 785 (1992), 793 (1992), 804 (1993), 811 (1993), 823 (1993), 834 (1993), 851 (1993) and 864 (1993) on the situation in Angola, the council noted the slight improvements in the country and extended the stationing of the United Nations Angola Verification Mission II (UNAVEM II) until 16 March 1994.

The security council began by underlining the importance it attached to the full implementation of the 'Accordos de Paz' peace agreements and relevant resolutions of the council. It also welcomed the resumption of negotiations in Lusaka between the Government of Angola and UNITA, noting that incidents of violence had decreased. At the same time however, it recognised the serious humanitarian situation in the country, the lack of ceasefire and the refusal of UNITA to accept the results of the 1992 elections.

The importance of a peaceful solution was stressed and urged both parties to be flexible in negotiations. The parties were called upon to abide by their commitments in Lusaka, urging both to immediately cease all military actions to stop the further suffering of the people and damage to the Angolan economy as well as establishing a durable ceasefire. The Secretary-General Boutros Boutros-Ghali was asked to report on the progress of the talks by 1 February 1994. The council also noted that the secretary-general had already taken steps to expand the UNAVEM II peacekeeping mission in the event of developments in the peace process. At the time, UNAVEM II was understaffed and was unable to monitor the entire country.

The resolution also affirmed the need for humanitarian aid to be delivered to the affected population, commending member states, United Nations agencies and non-governmental organisations for the efforts in this regard and urging them to continue the provision of humanitarian assistance. Given the ongoing negotiations between the Angolan government and UNITA, the security council decided not to impose an oil embargo against UNITA in Resolution 864 but announced its willingness to do so in the event of a recommendation by the secretary-general.

== See also ==
- Angolan Civil War
- Angolan legislative election, 1992
- Angolan presidential election, 1992
- List of United Nations Security Council Resolutions 801 to 900 (1993–1994)
- United Nations Angola Verification Mission III
