= United Nations Security Council Resolution 851 =

UN Security Council Resolution 851
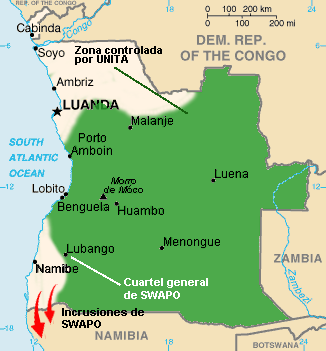
- UNITA expansion in Angola during the civil war
- Date: 15 July 1993
- Meeting no.: 3,254
- Code: S/RES/851 (Document)
- Subject: The situation in Angola
- Voting summary: 15 voted for; None voted against; None abstained
- Result: Adopted

Security Council composition
- Permanent members: China; France; Russia; United Kingdom; United States
- Non-permanent members: Brazil; Cape Verde; Djibouti; Hungary; Japan; Morocco; New Zealand; Pakistan; Spain; Venezuela

United Nations Security Council resolution 851, adopted unanimously on 15 July 1993, after reaffirming resolutions 696 (1991), 747 (1992), 785 (1992), 793 (1992), 804 (1993), 811 (1993), 823 (1993) and 834 (1993), the Council noted the continuing deterioration of the situation in Angola and extended the mandate of the United Nations Angola Verification Mission II (UNAVEM II) until 15 September 1993, discussing further the peace process in the country.

The resolution began by welcoming statements and declarations made by the Organisation of African Unity (OAU), Portugal, Russia, the United States and the World Conference on Human Rights in Vienna, Austria. There was concern however for the suspension of peace talks, lack of a ceasefire and the deteriorating political, military and humanitarian situation in the country. The efforts of the Secretary-General Boutros Boutros-Ghali and his Special Representative Margaret Anstee to bring about an end to the crisis through negotiations were supported, emphasising the importance of a continued United Nations presence in Angola.

The council reiterated its readiness to substantially expand the United Nations presence in the country in the event of significant progress in the peace process. It also demanded that UNITA accept the outcome of the elections in 1992 and abide by the "Acordos de Paz" peace agreement. UNITA's continued military actions which resulted in harm to the civilian population and Angolan economy as well as repeated attempts to seize additional territory and non-withdrawal of troops were all condemned. The Council stated that such violations were incompatible with the peace accords, stressing the need to immediately resume a ceasefire and implement the peace agreement and relevant Security Council resolutions. Meanwhile, all states were urged not to give military support to UNITA that could harm the peace process.

The security council stated it would consider further action under the United Nations Charter, including a compulsory arms embargo against UNITA, unless the Secretary-General reported by 15 September 1993 that a ceasefire was being observed and an agreement was reached on the implementation of the peace agreement and relevant Security Council resolutions. The legality of the Angolan government was recognised and welcomed the provision of assistance to the government in support of the democratic process and steps taken by Boutros-Ghali to implement the emergency humanitarian assistance plan. Taking note of UNITA's intention not to impede the delivery humanitarian aid, the resolution urged Member States, specialised agencies of the United Nations and non-governmental organisations to increase humanitarian relief assistance to Angola.

Further addressing UNITA, the council asked it to ensure the evacuation of foreign nationals and their family members from Huambo and other locations occupied by UNITA. An attack by UNITA forces on a train on 27 May 1993 in southern Angola which killed around 100 people, was condemned as a violation of international humanitarian law. In this regard, both parties were urged to ensure the safety of UNAVEM II and respect international humanitarian law and to guarantee unimpeded access for humanitarian assistance to the civilian population, praising the Secretary-General and his Special Representative for establishing agreed humanitarian aid corridors.

The resolution concluded by requesting the Secretary-General to report on developments in Angola by 15 September 1993, and submit as soon as possible the budgetary implications of bringing UNAVEM II up to its full strength as mandated in Resolution 696 (1991).

== See also ==
- Angolan Civil War
- Angolan legislative election, 1992
- Angolan presidential election, 1992
- List of United Nations Security Council Resolutions 801 to 900 (1993–1994)
- United Nations Angola Verification Mission III
