= United Nations Security Council Resolution 1102 =

UN Security Council Resolution 1102
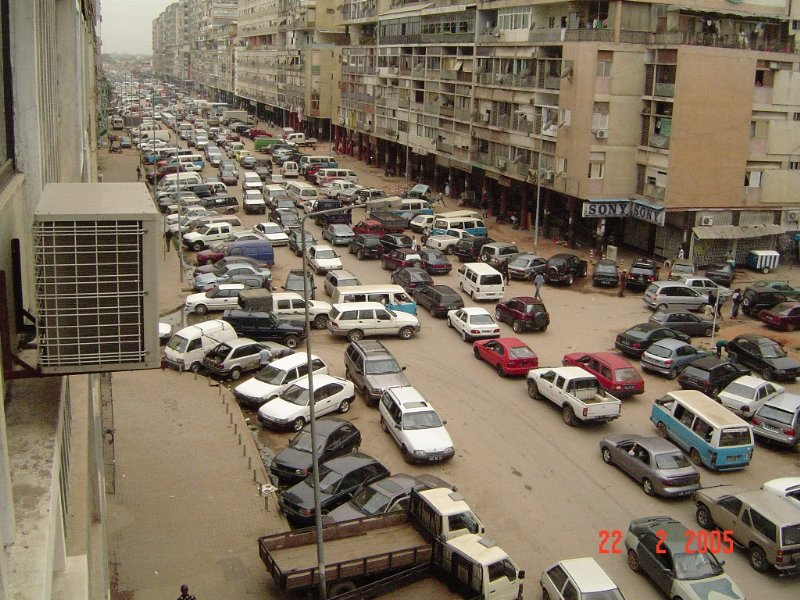
- Angolan capital Luanda
- Date: 31 March 1997
- Meeting no.: 3,759
- Code: S/RES/1102 (Document)
- Subject: The situation in Angola
- Voting summary: 15 voted for; None voted against; None abstained
- Result: Adopted

Security Council composition
- Permanent members: China; France; Russia; United Kingdom; United States
- Non-permanent members: Chile; Costa Rica; Egypt; Guinea-Bissau; Japan; Kenya; South Korea; Poland; Portugal; Sweden

United Nations Security Council resolution 1102, adopted unanimously on 31 March 1997, after reaffirming Resolution 696 (1991) and all subsequent resolutions on Angola, the Council extended the mandate of the United Nations Angola Verification Mission III (UNAVEM III) until 16 April 1997.

The Security Council began by reaffirming the sovereignty and territorial integrity of Angola and the importance of the implementation of the peace agreements, including the Lusaka Protocol. It stressed that the Government of Angola and UNITA had to take urgent and decisive steps forward in the peace process to ensure the continued involvement of the international community.

The efforts of the Secretary-General Kofi Annan during his visit to Angola were welcomed, along with the arrival of UNITA deputies and future officials of the Government of Unity and National Reconciliation (GURN) in the capital Luanda. According to the Angolan government, the GURN would be established by 11 April 1997 and subsequently all parties were called upon to form the GURN on that date. Both parties were also urged to implement the remaining military and political aspects of the peace process, such as the integration of UNITA soldiers into the Angolan Armed Forces, demobilisation and the improvement of state administration throughout the country.

The Secretary-General was requested to report on the formation of the GURN by 14 April 1997 and noted, in accordance with Resolution 1098 (1997), that measures in Resolution 864 (1993) would be imposed if the GURN was not established by the agreed date.

== See also ==
- Angolan Civil War
- List of United Nations Security Council Resolutions 1101 to 1200 (1997–1998)
- MONUA
- United Nations Angola Verification Mission I
- United Nations Angola Verification Mission II
