= United Nations Security Council Resolution 1055 =

UN Security Council Resolution 1055
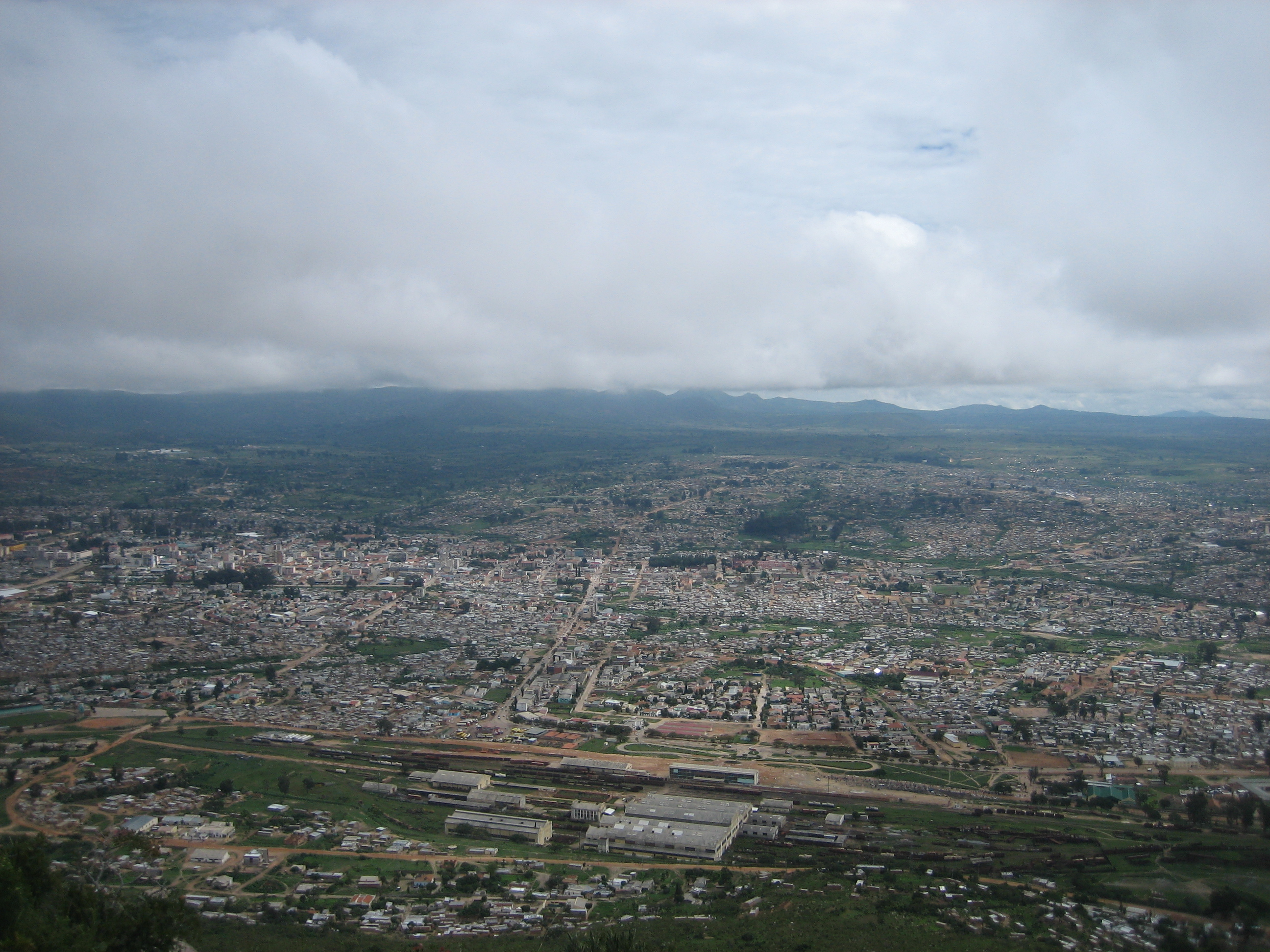
- Lubango in Angola
- Date: 8 May 1996
- Meeting no.: 3,662
- Code: S/RES/1055 (Document)
- Subject: The situation in Angola
- Voting summary: 15 voted for; None voted against; None abstained
- Result: Adopted

Security Council composition
- Permanent members: China; France; Russia; United Kingdom; United States
- Non-permanent members: Botswana; Chile; Egypt; Guinea-Bissau; Germany; Honduras; Indonesia; Italy; South Korea; Poland

United Nations Security Council resolution 1055, adopted unanimously on 8 May 1996, after reaffirming Resolution 696 (1991) and all subsequent resolutions on Angola, the Council discussed the peace process, and extended the mandate of the United Nations Angola Verification Mission III (UNAVEM III) until 11 July 1996.

The security council reiterated the importance of the peace accords and the Lusaka Protocol between Angola and UNITA. The peace process was progressing, but with delays, particularly the quartering of UNITA troops and the integration of the armed forces. Both sides had agreed to the formation of a unified armed forces in June 1996 and the establishment of a government of national unity and reconciliation between June and July 1996. In February 1997 it was expected, as provided for in Resolution 976 (1995) that UNAVEM III's mandate would be completed. The need for all parties to provide security to UNAVEM III, to respect human rights and ensure the demilitarisation of Angolan society was emphasised after the deaths of two UNAVEM III personnel on 3 April 1996. The arms embargo against the country was reaffirmed.

Concern was expressed at the lack of complete quartering of UNITA's troops in accordance with Resolution 1045 (1996), and was called on to complete this, hand over weapons to UNAVEM III and release all prisoners unconditionally by June 1996. Both UNITA and the Angolan government were required to resolve all remaining issues by 15 May 1996. Additionally, they were urged to cease all hostile propaganda and to assist the United Nations in establishing an independent radio. The Secretary-General was asked to brief the council on 17 May 1996 on whether the parties had completed the tasks set, and on 1 July 1996 to submit a progress report.

== See also ==
- Angolan Civil War
- List of United Nations Security Council Resolutions 1001 to 1100 (1995–1997)
- United Nations Angola Verification Mission I
- United Nations Angola Verification Mission II
