= United Nations Security Council Resolution 1157 =

UN Security Council Resolution 1157
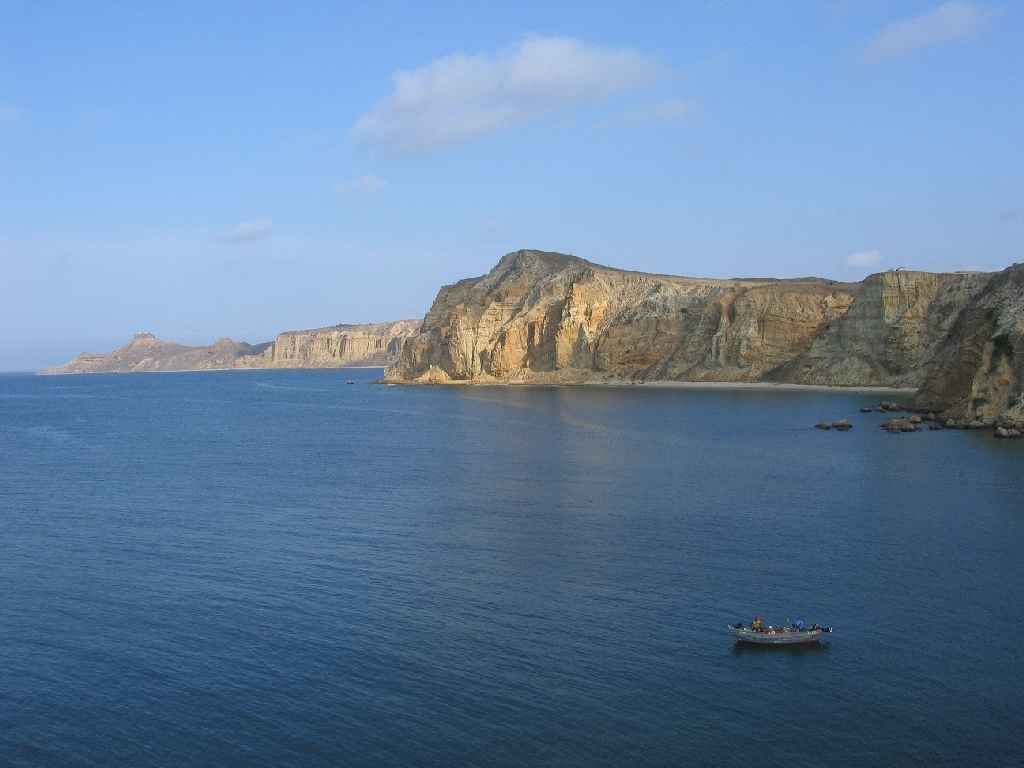
- Coastline of Benguela in western Angola
- Date: 20 March 1998
- Meeting no.: 3,863
- Code: S/RES/1157 (Document)
- Subject: The situation in Angola
- Voting summary: 15 voted for; None voted against; None abstained
- Result: Adopted

Security Council composition
- Permanent members: China; France; Russia; United Kingdom; United States
- Non-permanent members: Bahrain; Brazil; Costa Rica; Gabon; Gambia; Japan; Kenya; Portugal; Slovenia; Sweden

United Nations Security Council resolution 1157, adopted unanimously on 20 March 1998, after reaffirming Resolution 696 (1991) and all subsequent resolutions on Angola, the Council increased the number of civilian police monitors by up to 83 personnel to assist both the Angolan government and UNITA resolve issues in the peace process and reduced the military component of the United Nations Observer Mission in Angola (MONUA).

The preamble of the resolution deplored the failure of UNITA to complete its tasks under the Lusaka Protocol and noted declarations by UNITA concerning the complete demilitarisation of its forces and of the Government of Unity and National Reconciliation (GURN) legalising UNITA as a political party.

The security council demanded that the GURN and particularly UNITA unconditionally complete the remaining tasks under the Acordos de Paz, Lusaka Protocol and security council resolutions and end its delays. All countries were reminded to continue observing the restrictions imposed in Resolution 1127 (1997) and report violations to the committee established in Resolution 864 (1993). It endorsed the recommendation of Secretary-General Kofi Annan to reduce the military component of MONUA before 30 April 1998, leaving one infantry company, helicopter unit and medical staff remaining by 1 July 1998. At the same time, the number of police observers would gradually be increased to 83 to help with the normalisation of state authority throughout Angola and the training of the National Police.

The resolution requested the secretary-general by 17 April 1998 to report on the implementation of the peace process and the expected termination of MONUA and United Nations follow-on presence after 30 April 1998. It strongly condemned attacks by UNITA on MONUA peacekeeping forces and Angolan authorities. Information was requested on the location of land mines, and the rule of law was stressed. The Council concluded by stating that a summit meeting between the President of Angola José Eduardo dos Santos and the leader of UNITA Jonas Savimbi could accelerate the peace process.

== See also ==
- Angolan Civil War
- List of United Nations Security Council Resolutions 1101 to 1200 (1997–1998)
- United Nations Angola Verification Mission I
- United Nations Angola Verification Mission II
- United Nations Angola Verification Mission III
