= United Nations Security Council Resolution 1075 =

UN Security Council Resolution 1075
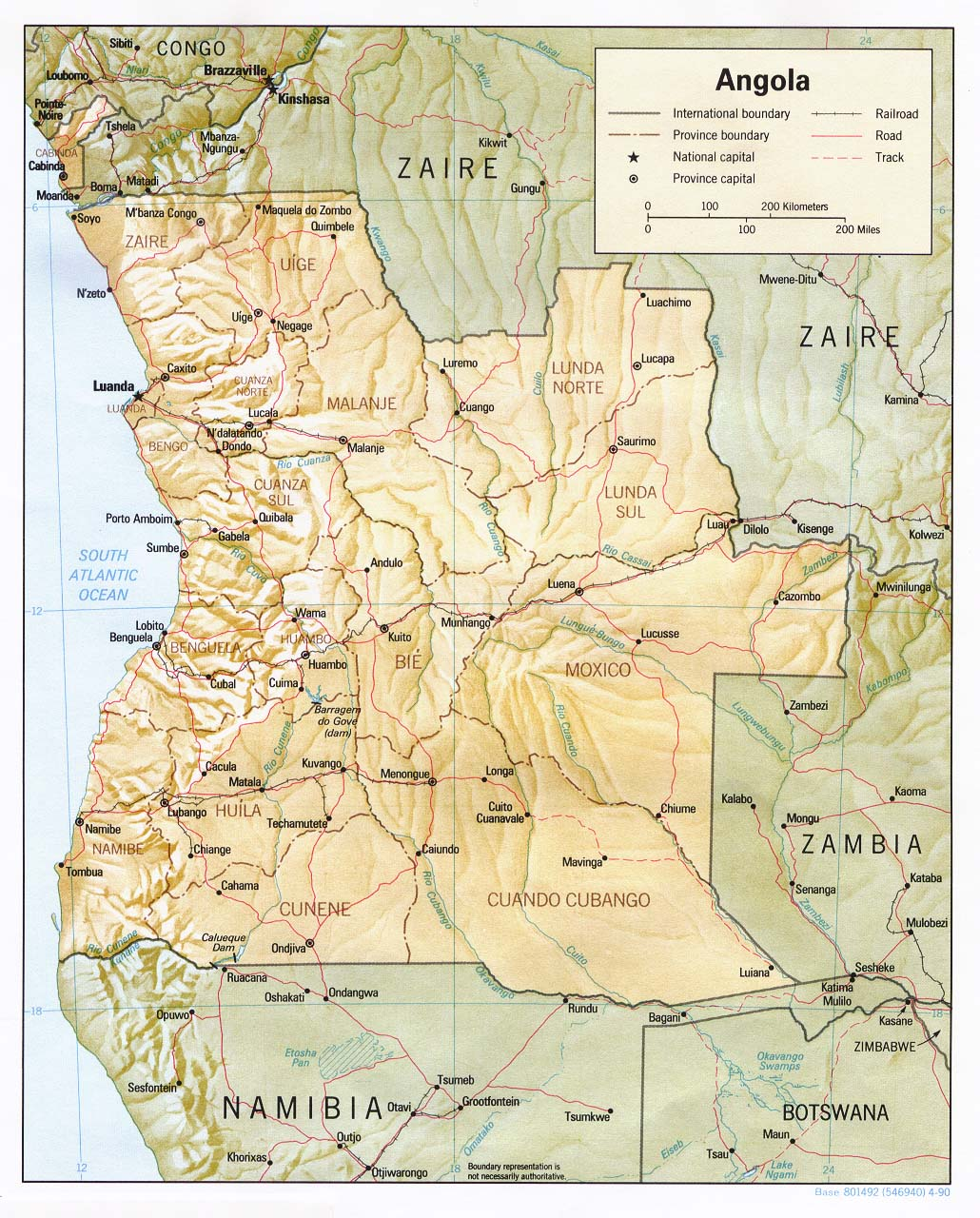
- Angola
- Date: 11 October 1996
- Meeting no.: 3,703
- Code: S/RES/1075 (Document)
- Subject: The situation in Angola
- Voting summary: 15 voted for; None voted against; None abstained
- Result: Adopted

Security Council composition
- Permanent members: China; France; Russia; United Kingdom; United States
- Non-permanent members: Botswana; Chile; Egypt; Guinea-Bissau; Germany; Honduras; Indonesia; Italy; South Korea; Poland

United Nations Security Council resolution 1075, adopted unanimously on 11 October 1996, after reaffirming Resolution 696 (1991) and all subsequent resolutions on Angola, the Council assigned further tasks to UNITA and extended the mandate of the United Nations Angola Verification Mission III (UNAVEM III) until 11 December 1996.

On 2 October 1996 there was a summit of the Southern African Development Community (SADC) on politics, defense and security held in the Angolan capital Luanda. A delegation of SADC had also participated in the Security Council's deliberations on Angola. It was important that all parties adhered to the peace plans in Angola, including the Lusaka Protocol, respect human rights and the presence of the United Nations to implement the agreements.

Concern was expressed at the lack of progress in the peace process over the past three months. Delays in the demobilisation of UNITA troops meant the process was behind schedule, making progress even more difficult during the rainy season. The delays, particularly by UNITA, were unacceptable for the council. However positive steps included the arrival of UNITA generals for service in the unified army, the quartering of 63,000 troops, the surrender of heavy weapons, selection of 10,000 UNITA troops for the unified army, the beginning of the demobilisation of underaged personnel and UNITA's proposal regarding the special status of its leader.

The Security Council was disappointed that UNITA had failed to comply with its obligations and called on the group to immediately accomplish the following tasks:

(a) to complete the selection of 26,300 soldiers to be incorporated into the Angolan Armed Forces;
(b) to stem the flow of deserters from quartering areas and return those who have deserted;
(c) to register UNITA policeman;
(d) to dismantle all UNITA command posts;
(e) to formally declare that all UNITA soldiers were quartered and that UNITA no longer had weapons;
(f) to contribute to the extension of state administration throughout Angola and co-operate with UNAVEM III;
(g) to make other generals and officers available to the military unit;
(h) to return all elected members of the National Assembly;
(i) to refrain from hindering demining activities and United Nations flights;
(j) to co-operate with the Government of Angola and to make its radio station independent and non-partisan;
(k) to complete training of UNITA personnel which would protect UNITA officials;
(l) to allow the free movement of goods and people.

Unless these tasks were fulfilled, the council would consider imposing measures from Resolution 864 (1993). The Secretary-General Boutros Boutros-Ghali's intention to reduce the size of UNAVEM III by the end of December 1996 in accordance with Resolution 976 (1995) was noted, which also recommended that the mandate of UNAVEM III end by February 1997. He was also asked to report to the council by 20 November and 1 December 1996 on progress in the peace process.

== See also ==
- Angolan Civil War
- List of United Nations Security Council Resolutions 1001 to 1100 (1995–1997)
- United Nations Angola Verification Mission I
- United Nations Angola Verification Mission II
