= United Nations Security Council Resolution 1180 =

UN Security Council Resolution 1180
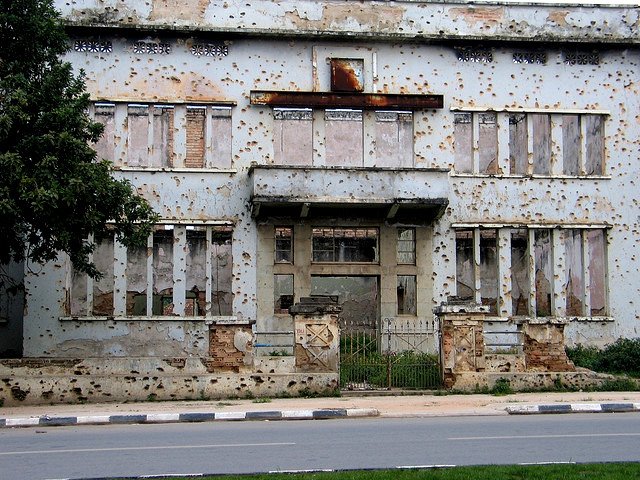
- Building with bullet holes from the civil war in Huambo, central Angola
- Date: 29 June 1998
- Meeting no.: 3,899
- Code: S/RES/1180 (Document)
- Subject: The situation in Angola
- Voting summary: 15 voted for; None voted against; None abstained
- Result: Adopted

Security Council composition
- Permanent members: China; France; Russia; United Kingdom; United States
- Non-permanent members: Bahrain; Brazil; Costa Rica; Gabon; Gambia; Japan; Kenya; Portugal; Slovenia; Sweden

United Nations Security Council resolution 1180, adopted unanimously on 29 June 1998, after reaffirming Resolution 696 (1991) and all subsequent resolutions on Angola, particularly resolutions 1173 (1998) and 1176 (1998), the Council extended the mandate of the United Nations Observer Mission in Angola (MONUA) until 15 August 1998.

The security council expressed strong concern at the critical situation in the Angolan peace process due to UNITA's failure to implement the Acordos de Paz and Lusaka Protocol peace agreements, relevant security council resolutions. It was also concerned at the deteriorating security situation in the country as a result of armed attacks by UNITA, the relaying of land mines and instances of banditry. There were reports of serious abuse by the Angolan National Police and the importance of the rule of law was emphasised.

After extending MONUA's mandate, the council also decided to continue with the withdrawal of its military component in accordance with Resolution 1164 (1998). The Secretary-General Kofi Annan was asked to reconsider the additional deployment of civilian police and was also instructed to report on the situation on the ground by 7 August 1998.

The resolution demanded that UNITA cease attacks on MONUA, international personnel, the Government of Unity and National Reconciliation (GURN), police and civilians. Both the GURN and UNITA had to co-operate with MONUA in the investigation of UNITA's demilitarisation and to refrain from laying mines. During informal consultations the council also paid tribute to victims of a helicopter crash which claimed the lives of MONUA personnel and the Secretary-General's Special Representative of the Secretary-General for Angola, Alioune Blondin Beye.

== See also ==
- Angolan Civil War
- List of United Nations Security Council Resolutions 1101 to 1200 (1997–1998)
- United Nations Angola Verification Mission I
- United Nations Angola Verification Mission II
- United Nations Angola Verification Mission III
