= United Nations Security Council Resolution 1190 =

UN Security Council Resolution 1190
- Angola in southern Africa
- Date: 13 August 1998
- Meeting no.: 3,916
- Code: S/RES/1190 (Document)
- Subject: The situation in Angola
- Voting summary: 15 voted for; None voted against; None abstained
- Result: Adopted

Security Council composition
- Permanent members: China; France; Russia; United Kingdom; United States
- Non-permanent members: Bahrain; Brazil; Costa Rica; Gabon; Gambia; Japan; Kenya; Portugal; Slovenia; Sweden

United Nations Security Council resolution 1190, adopted unanimously on 13 August 1998, after reaffirming Resolution 696 (1991) and all subsequent resolutions on Angola, particularly resolutions 864 (1993), 1127 (1997) and 1173 (1998), the Council extended the mandate of the United Nations Observer Mission in Angola (MONUA) until 15 September 1998.

The security council deplored the deteriorating political and security situation in Angola, primarily due to the failure of UNITA to complete its obligations under the Acordos de Paz, Lusaka Protocol and relevant Security Council resolutions. Additionally, it noted that positive steps were taken to build confidence in the peace process.

The resolution welcomed the decision of the Secretary-General Kofi Annan to dispatch his Special Envoy to the country and requested the secretary-general to make recommendations regarding the future of the United Nations presence in Angola by 31 August 1998 which would be reviewed by the council. It demanded that UNITA immediately fulfill its obligations under the Lusaka Protocol and security council resolutions, including full demilitarisation and the extension of state administration throughout Angola.

Both the Angolan government and UNITA were urged to cease hostile propaganda, laying land mines, end forced conscription, co-operate with MONUA in its verification activities and make efforts towards national reconciliation. The government in particular was asked to ensure that the Angolan National Police refrain from activities inconsistent with the Lusaka Protocol and to respect UNITA as a political party. Finally, states were reminded to implement sanctions authorised in prior resolutions.

== See also ==
- Angolan Civil War
- List of United Nations Security Council Resolutions 1101 to 1200 (1997–1998)
- United Nations Angola Verification Mission I
- United Nations Angola Verification Mission II
- United Nations Angola Verification Mission III
