= United Nations Security Council Resolution 1135 =

UN Security Council Resolution 1135
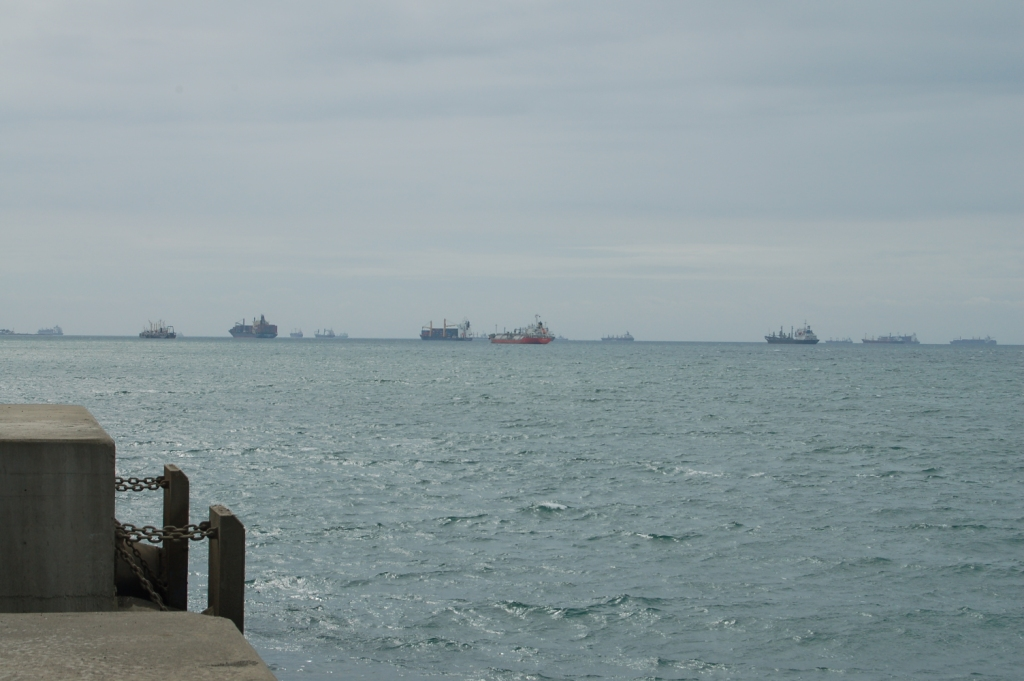
- Container ships near Luanda harbour
- Date: 29 October 1997
- Meeting no.: 3,827
- Code: S/RES/1135 (Document)
- Subject: The situation in Angola
- Voting summary: 15 voted for; None voted against; None abstained
- Result: Adopted

Security Council composition
- Permanent members: China; France; Russia; United Kingdom; United States
- Non-permanent members: Chile; Costa Rica; Egypt; Guinea-Bissau; Japan; Kenya; South Korea; Poland; Portugal; Sweden

United Nations Security Council resolution 1135, adopted unanimously on 29 October 1997, after reaffirming Resolution 696 (1991) and all subsequent resolutions on Angola, the Council extended the mandate of the United Nations Observer Mission in Angola (MONUA) until 30 January 1998 and urged UNITA to comply with previous resolutions, particularly as sanctions were due to come into effect.

The government of Angola and specifically UNITA had to urgently complete the implementation of the Acordos de Paz and Lusaka Protocol peace agreements. The Council noted that overall, there was a lack of significant progress, mainly due to UNITA not fulfilling its obligations. It recognised the important role of MONUA at this stage in the peace process.

After extending the duration of MONUA's mandate, the reduction of its troops was postponed on a recommendation of the secretary-general until the end of November 1997. The resolution demanded that the Angolan government and particularly UNITA immediately complete the implementation of its obligations under the two peace agreements and Resolution 1127 (1997). It was also urged to contribute to the expansion of state authority throughout Angola. The Secretary-General Kofi Annan was requested to report on UNITA's compliance by 8 December 1997 and every 90 days thereafter. The council recognised that measures against UNITA were due to come into effect, and asked Member States to report to the committee established in Resolution 864 (1993) on measures they had taken to enforce the restrictions.

The security council reiterated its stance that a meeting between the President of Angola José Eduardo dos Santos and the leader of UNITA Jonas Savimbi could reduce the tension. Finally, the international community was asked to support the process in Angola, including the demilitarisation and reintegration of combatants, demining, housing displaced persons and the recovery of the economy. In the aftermath of the resolution, UNITA severed almost all contact with the United Nations and Angolan government.

== See also ==
- Angolan Civil War
- List of United Nations Security Council Resolutions 1101 to 1200 (1997–1998)
- United Nations Angola Verification Mission I
- United Nations Angola Verification Mission II
- United Nations Angola Verification Mission III
