= United Nations Security Council Resolution 1213 =

UN Security Council Resolution 1213
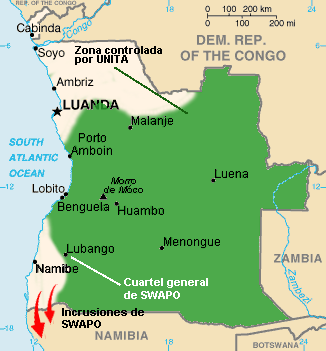
- UNITA territory during the civil war
- Date: 3 December 1998
- Meeting no.: 3,951
- Code: S/RES/1213 (Document)
- Subject: The situation in Angola
- Voting summary: 15 voted for; None voted against; None abstained
- Result: Adopted

Security Council composition
- Permanent members: China; France; Russia; United Kingdom; United States
- Non-permanent members: Bahrain; Brazil; Costa Rica; Gabon; Gambia; Japan; Kenya; Portugal; Slovenia; Sweden

United Nations Security Council resolution 1213, adopted unanimously on 3 December 1998, after reaffirming Resolution 696 (1991) and all subsequent resolutions on Angola, including resolutions 846 (1993), 1127 (1997) and 1173 (1998), the Council extended the mandate of the United Nations Observer Mission in Angola (MONUA) for a final time until 26 February 1999.

The Security Council condemned the failure of UNITA to implement the remaining tasks of the Lusaka Protocol including the demilitarisation of its forces and the extension of state administration throughout the country. It was concerned that the leader of UNITA, Jonas Savimbi, had not responded to proposals for the restoration of the peace process by the Special Representative of the Secretary-General. There was a serious humanitarian impact brought about by the impasse in the peace process which had consequences on the security of the country.

The resolution reiterated that the primary cause of the political crisis in Angola was due to the failure of UNITA to comply with its obligations under various peace agreements and Security Council resolutions. Furthermore, it demanded that it complete the demilitarisation of its forces and withdraw from territories it occupied through military means; there could be no military solution to the conflict and both parties were urged to seek a political settlement. Additionally, UNITA was urged to co-operate with MONUA in the withdrawal of MONUA personnel from Andulo and Bailundo. Law enforcement had to be strengthened and human rights respected.

The humanitarian situation continued to worsen, including the rise in the number of internally displaced persons, increased mine laying. The Angolan government and particularly UNITA were urged to guarantee the safety of United Nations and humanitarian personnel and permit humanitarian aid to be delivered to the affected population, cease mine laying activities and respect international humanitarian law.

Finally, the Secretary-General Kofi Annan was requested to report back to the Council no later 15 January 1999 on the future of MONUA and the United Nations presence in Angola, and on ways of improving the effectiveness of sanctions imposed against UNITA in previous resolutions.

== See also ==
- Angolan Civil War
- List of United Nations Security Council Resolutions 1201 to 1300 (1998–2000)
- United Nations Angola Verification Mission I
- United Nations Angola Verification Mission II
- United Nations Angola Verification Mission III
