= United Nations Security Council Resolution 834 =

UN Security Council Resolution 834
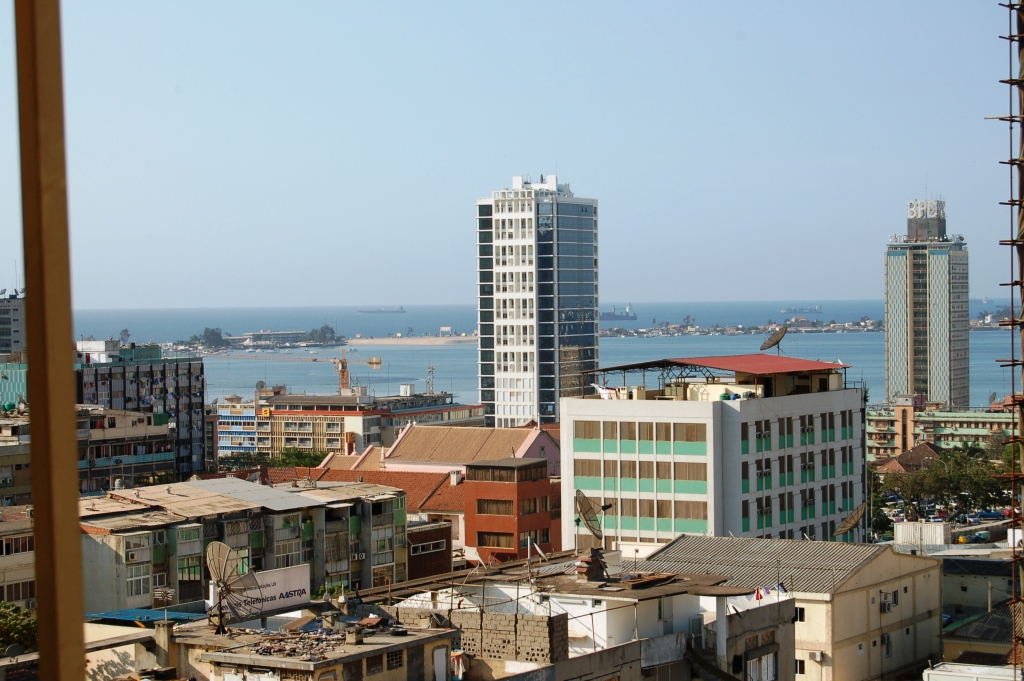
- Angolan capital Luanda
- Date: 1 June 1993
- Meeting no.: 3,226
- Code: S/RES/834 (Document)
- Subject: Angola
- Voting summary: 15 voted for; None voted against; None abstained
- Result: Adopted

Security Council composition
- Permanent members: China; France; Russia; United Kingdom; United States
- Non-permanent members: Brazil; Cape Verde; Djibouti; Hungary; Japan; Morocco; New Zealand; Pakistan; Spain; Venezuela

United Nations Security Council resolution 834, adopted unanimously on 1 June 1993, after reaffirming resolutions 696 (1991), 747 (1992), 785 (1992), 793 (1992), 804 (1993), 811 (1993) and 823 (1993), the council indicated its concern at the deteriorating political, military and humanitarian situation in Angola and extended the mandate of the United Nations Angola Verification Mission II (UNAVEM II) for a period of 45 days ending 15 July 1993.

The talks between the country and the rebel group UNITA in Abidjan, Côte d'Ivoire, had failed and a ceasefire was not established. The council supported the Secretary-General Boutros Boutros-Ghali's efforts to bring about an end to the crisis, stressing the importance of the United Nations presence to push forward the peace process.

After extending the mandate of UNAVEM II until 15 July 1993, the resolution demanded that UNITA accept the outcome of the elections in 1992 and abide by the Peace Accords. The actions and attacks by UNITA were condemned and both parties were also urged to resume talks as soon as possible, noting that UNITA would be responsible for any breakdown of the talks. The council also called upon all countries not to provide UNITA with direct or indirect military support.

The security council welcomed the Secretary-General's steps to strengthen humanitarian efforts in Angola with all states, specialised agencies and non-governmental organisations were invited to contribute generously. Both parties were called upon to respect international humanitarian law, including not impede the access of humanitarian aid to the population, and to ensure the security and safety of humanitarian personnel. The work of the secretary-general and his special representative was commended after the establishment of agreed humanitarian corridors in the country.

Finally, Boutros-Ghali was asked to submit a report on or before 15 July 1993 on the situation and to make recommendations on the further role of the United Nations in the peace process. The security council reiterated its position that it would take prompt action on the recommendation of the Secretary-General to expand the United Nations presence in Angola.

== See also ==
- Angolan Civil War
- Angolan legislative election, 1992
- Angolan presidential election, 1992
- List of United Nations Security Council Resolutions 801 to 900 (1993–1994)
- United Nations Angola Verification Mission III
