= United Nations Security Council Resolution 1045 =

UN Security Council Resolution 1045
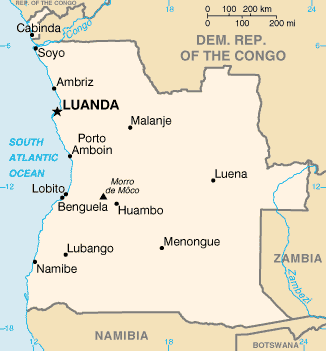
- Angola
- Date: 8 February 1996
- Meeting no.: 3,629
- Code: S/RES/1045 (Document)
- Subject: The situation in Angola
- Voting summary: 15 voted for; None voted against; None abstained
- Result: Adopted

Security Council composition
- Permanent members: China; France; Russia; United Kingdom; United States
- Non-permanent members: Botswana; Chile; Egypt; Guinea-Bissau; Germany; Honduras; Indonesia; Italy; South Korea; Poland

United Nations Security Council resolution 1045, adopted unanimously on 8 February 1996, after reaffirming Resolution 696 (1991) and all subsequent resolutions on Angola, the Council discussed the implementation of the Lusaka Protocol, and extended the mandate of the United Nations Angola Verification Mission III (UNAVEM III) until 8 May 1996.

The Security Council reiterated the importance it attached to the implementation of the Peace Accords, the Lusaka Protocol and relevant Security Council resolutions, and was deeply concerned about the delays in the implementation of the Lusaka Protocol and the worsening humanitarian situation. The importance of rehabilitating the Angolan economy was emphasised. It was noted that in Resolution 976 (1995), the Council expected that UNAVEM III would complete its mandate in February 1997, but that the implementation of the Lusaka Protocol was behind schedule.

The Government of Angola and UNITA were reminded of their obligations with regard to maintaining a ceasefire, concluding military talks on integration of the armed forces, the demining process, and commencing the integration of UNITA personnel. There were positive steps taken that would put Angola were welcomed and it was expected that the country would continue quartering of the rapid reaction police, deployment of the Angolan Armed Forces to barracks, the repatriation of expatriate personnel and a programme for disarming the civilian population. In particular, the quartering and disarming of UNITA troops was delayed and in this regard, UNITA was therefore urged to implement this part of the agreement as part of the peace process.

Both parties were then asked to cease the broadcast of hostile propaganda through the radio and to contribute towards the impartial UNAVEM radio. Also, the President of Angola and the President of UNITA were encouraged to meet regularly; all countries were reminded to observe the arms embargo against UNITA in Resolution 864 (1993). Finally, the Secretary-General Boutros Boutros-Ghali was requested to report to the council on 7 March 4 April and 1 May 1996 on the progress made between the two parties and the agreed timetable between them.

== See also ==
- Angolan Civil War
- List of United Nations Security Council Resolutions 1001 to 1100 (1995–1997)
- United Nations Angola Verification Mission I
- United Nations Angola Verification Mission II
