= United Nations Security Council Resolution 1164 =

United Nations Security Council resolution

UN Security Council Resolution 1164
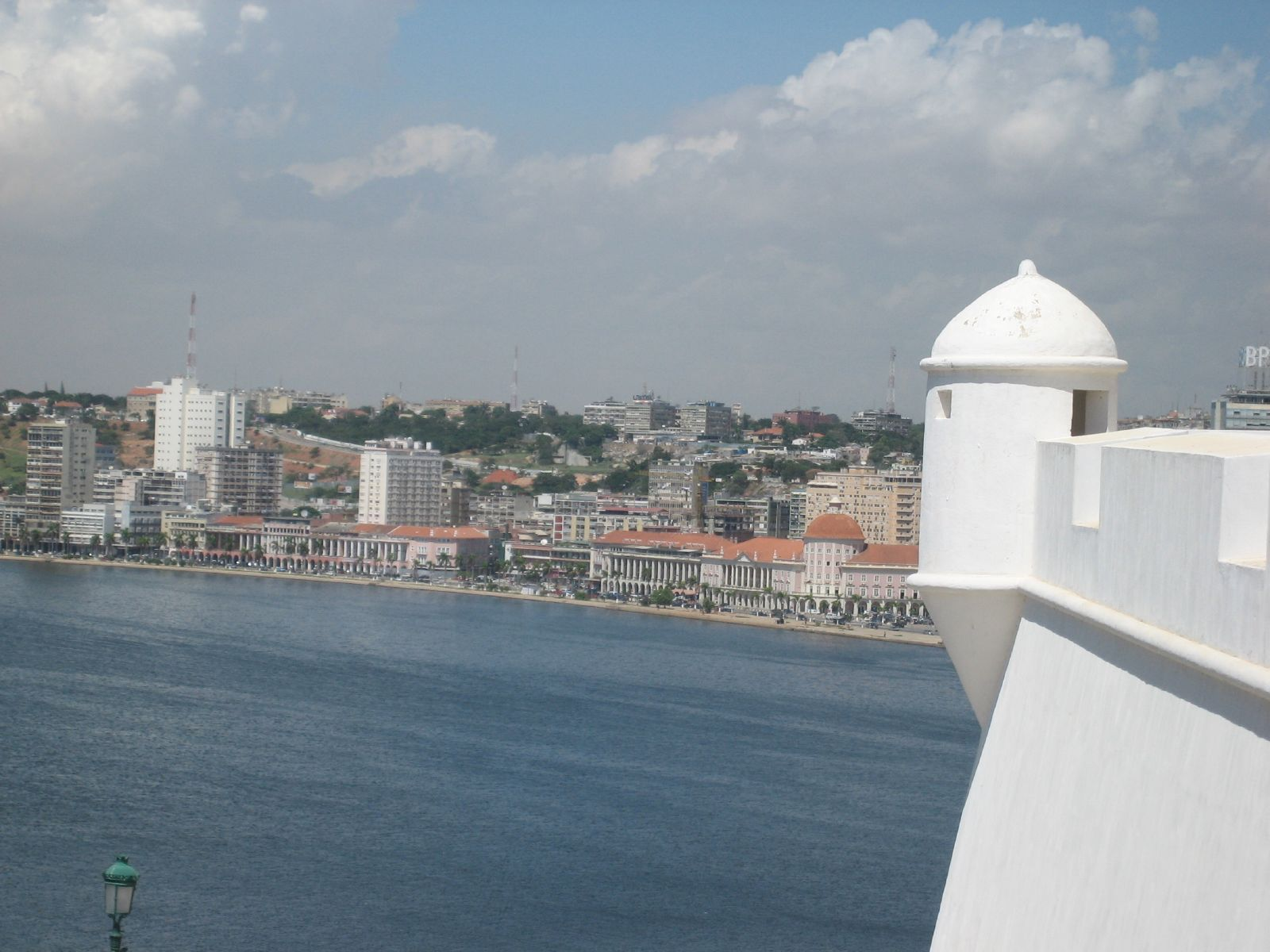
- Angolan capital Luanda
- Date: 29 April 1998
- Meeting no.: 3,876
- Code: S/RES/1164 (Document)
- Subject: The situation in Angola
- Voting summary: 15 voted for; None voted against; None abstained
- Result: Adopted

Security Council composition
- Permanent members: China; France; Russia; United Kingdom; United States
- Non-permanent members: Bahrain; Brazil; Costa Rica; Gabon; Gambia; Japan; Kenya; Portugal; Slovenia; Sweden

United Nations Security Council resolution 1164, adopted unanimously on 29 April 1998, after reaffirming Resolution 696 (1991) and all subsequent resolutions on Angola, the Council extended the mandate of the United Nations Observer Mission in Angola (MONUA).

The Security Council noted the progress made by the Angolan Government of Unity and National Reconciliation (GURN) and UNITA towards the implementation of aspects of the Lusaka Protocol, including the promulgation of a law granting special status to the leader of UNITA Jonas Savimbi, the appointment of UNITA governors, a list of ambassadors nominated by UNITA, the cessation of hostile radio broadcasts and the establishment of UNITA headquarters in the capital Luanda.

The Angolan government and UNITA were called upon to implement all remaining obligations under the peace agreements and Security Council resolutions. The Council demanded that UNITA end delays and linkages to irrelevant issues, and the completion of the normalisation of state administration in the towns of Andulo and Bailundo. Attacks by UNITA on MONUA troops, Angolan authorities, police and civilians were strongly condemned, with MONUA urged to investigate a recent attack.

The resolution reiterated the recommendation of Secretary-General Kofi Annan to reduce the military component of MONUA, leaving one infantry company, helicopter unit, medical staff and 90 military observers remaining by 1 July 1998. At the same time, the number of police observers would gradually be increased to 83 to help with the normalisation of state authority throughout Angola and the training of the National Police. It concluded by asking countries to continue to enforce measures against UNITA, and for the Secretary-General to report by 17 June 1998 on the status of the peace process and recommendations for a future United Nations presence in Angola.

== See also ==
- Angolan Civil War
- List of United Nations Security Council Resolutions 1101 to 1200 (1997–1998)
- United Nations Angola Verification Mission I
- United Nations Angola Verification Mission II
- United Nations Angola Verification Mission III
