= United Nations Security Council Resolution 1064 =

UN Security Council Resolution 1064
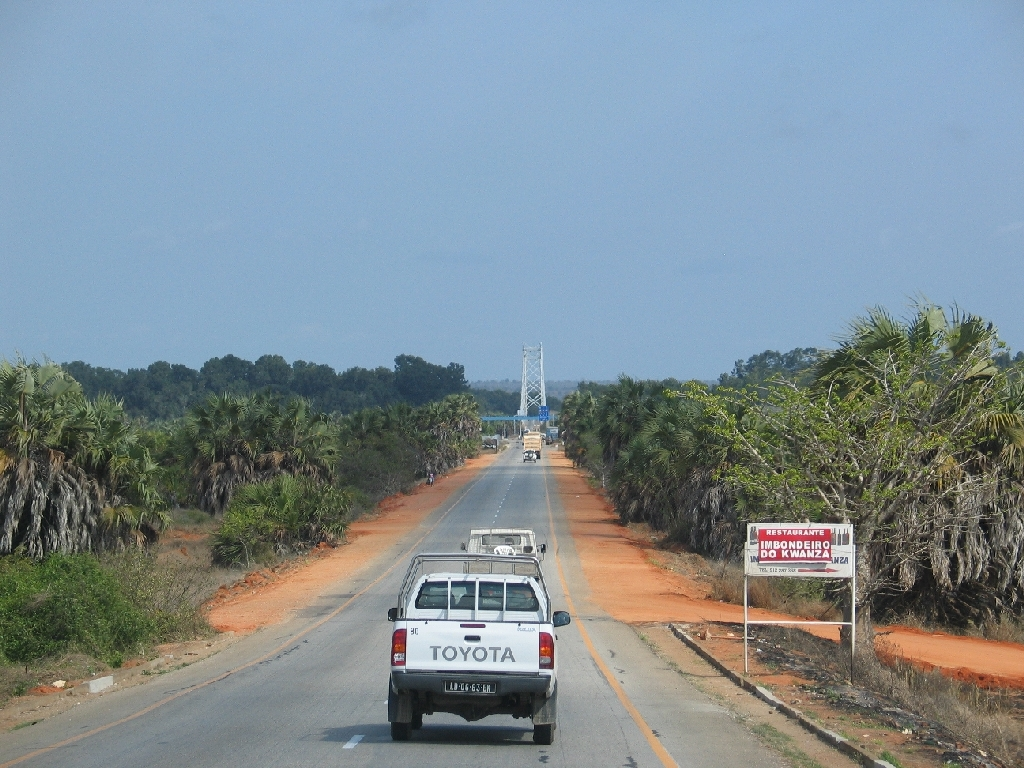
- Bridge crossing at the Cuanza River
- Date: 11 July 1996
- Meeting no.: 3,679
- Code: S/RES/1064 (Document)
- Subject: The situation in Angola
- Voting summary: 15 voted for; None voted against; None abstained
- Result: Adopted

Security Council composition
- Permanent members: China; France; Russia; United Kingdom; United States
- Non-permanent members: Botswana; Chile; Egypt; Guinea-Bissau; Germany; Honduras; Indonesia; Italy; South Korea; Poland

United Nations Security Council resolution 1064, adopted unanimously on 11 July 1996, after reaffirming Resolution 696 (1991) and all subsequent resolutions on Angola, the Council discussed the peace process, and extended the mandate of the United Nations Angola Verification Mission III (UNAVEM III) until 11 October 1996.

The Security Council stressed the importance of the timely implementation of various peace agreements, including the Lusaka Protocol, between Angolan government and UNITA. Progress had been made recently, but the overall pace of implementation was slow. Talks on the formation of an army unit had been successfully completed and there was also an agreement on forming a unity government. Respect for human rights and the demilitarisation of Angolan society was important and the recovery of the Angolan economy was essential for lasting peace.

The two parties were praised for the military framework agreement and the beginning of the integration of UNITA troops into the Angolan army. They had also worked on the removal of checkpoints, the re-opening of major roads and the quartering of 52,000 UNITA troops, which were all welcomed by the council. UNITA was requested to transfer its arms and ammunition to UNAVEM III. The Angolan government had also promulgated an amnesty law and a civilian disarmament program had started.

There was a reduction in hostile propaganda and all parties were reminded to cease disseminating such information. The resolution also condemned the use of mercenaries, and requested the Secretary-General Boutros Boutros-Ghali by 1 October 1996 on the implementation of the current resolution.

== See also ==
- Angolan Civil War
- List of United Nations Security Council Resolutions 1001 to 1100 (1995–1997)
- United Nations Angola Verification Mission I
- United Nations Angola Verification Mission II
