= United Nations Security Council Resolution 903 =

UN Security Council Resolution 903
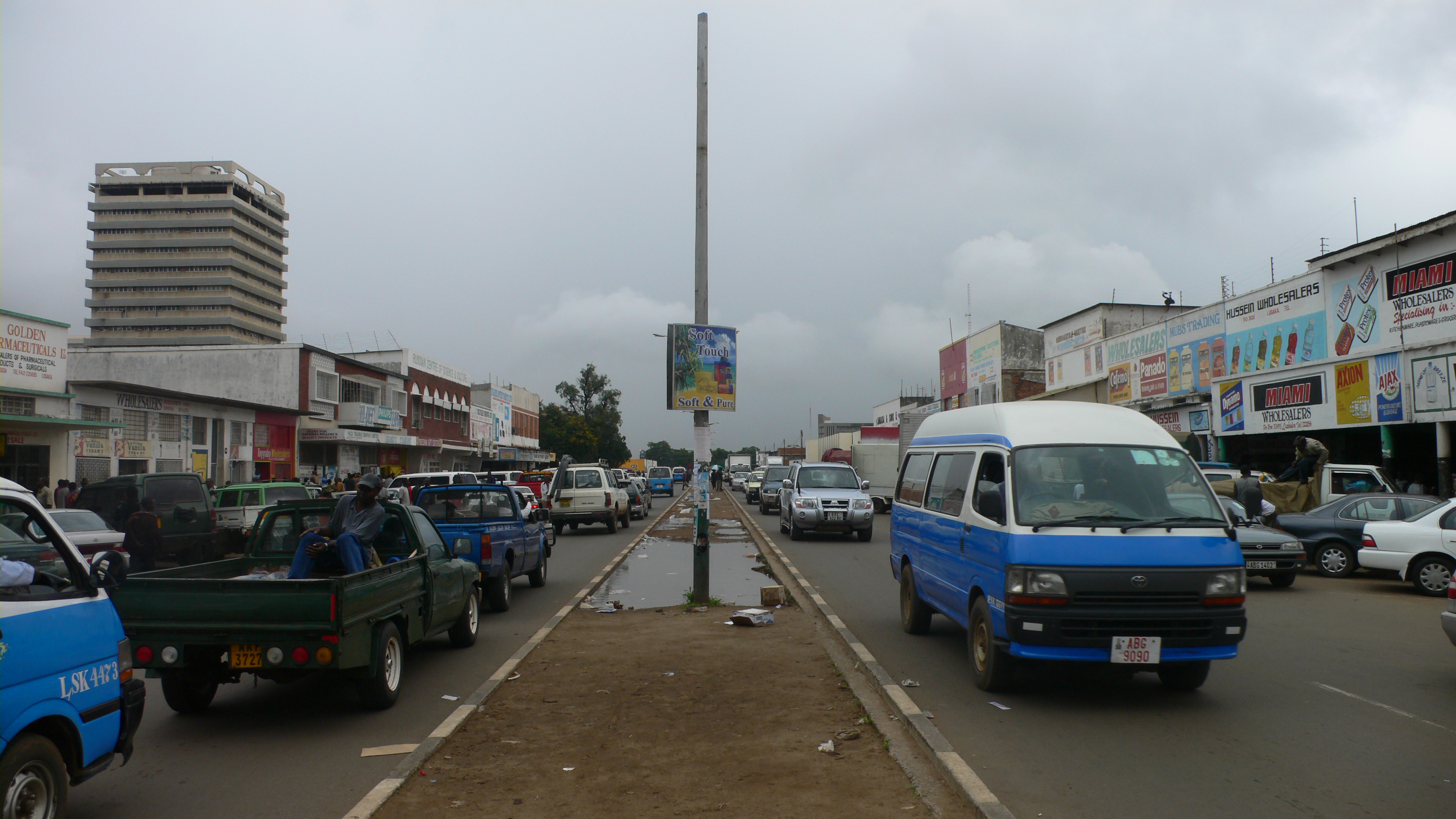
- The talks took place in the Zambian capital Lusaka
- Date: 16 March 1994
- Meeting no.: 3,350
- Code: S/RES/903 (Document)
- Subject: Angola
- Voting summary: 15 voted for; None voted against; None abstained
- Result: Adopted

Security Council composition
- Permanent members: China; France; Russia; United Kingdom; United States
- Non-permanent members: Argentina; Brazil; Czech Republic; Djibouti; New Zealand; Nigeria; Oman; Pakistan; Rwanda; Spain

United Nations Security Council resolution 903, adopted unanimously on 16 March 1994, after reaffirming Resolution 696 (1991) and all subsequent resolutions on Angola, the Council strengthened and extended the mandate of the United Nations Angola Verification Mission II (UNAVEM II) until 31 May 1994.

The council reiterated the importance it attached to the Accordos de Paz and the continued presence of the United Nations in the country, welcoming the progress in talks between the Government of Angola and UNITA held in the Zambian capital Lusaka. UNITA was urged to accept the results of the 1992 elections, noting that future decisions made on Angola would depend on the political will of both parties to achieve peace. The efforts of neighbouring states and the Organisation of African Unity (OAU) were welcomed. However, concern was expressed at the continuing hostilities and the effect on the civilian population, which emphasised the need for a ceasefire. Overall, the Council noted, the humanitarian situation in Angola had improved though in some areas the situation remained serious.

Both parties were urged to honour their commitments, attain an effective ceasefire immediately and to reach a peace settlement, demanding that all military operations cease. After extending the stationing of UNAVEM II, the Council declared its readiness to authorise an increase in the peacekeeping mission to its previous level of 350 military observers, 126 police observers and 14 military medical staff with an appropriate number of international and local civilian staff. Any actions which hindered the delivery of humanitarian assistance and endangered the lives of humanitarian workers was condemned, while the international community was urged to provide assistance in this regard.

Given the ongoing negotiations between the Angolan government and UNITA, no new measures would be imposed against UNITA. The Secretary-General Boutros Boutros-Ghali was requested to keep the Council informed on developments in the talks in Lusaka, Zambia, as well as on the military and humanitarian situation in Angola in a report to be submitted no later than 4 April 1994.

== See also ==
- Angolan Civil War
- Angolan legislative election, 1992
- Angolan presidential election, 1992
- List of United Nations Security Council Resolutions 901 to 1000 (1994–1995)
- Lusaka Protocol
- United Nations Angola Verification Mission III
