= United Nations Security Council Resolution 823 =

UN Security Council Resolution 823
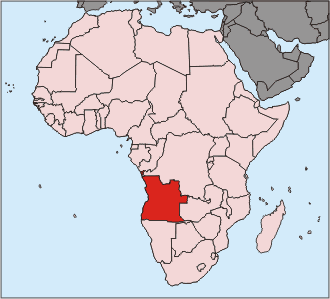
- Angola within Africa
- Date: 30 April 1993
- Meeting no.: 3,206
- Code: S/RES/823 (Document)
- Subject: Angola
- Voting summary: 15 voted for; None voted against; None abstained
- Result: Adopted

Security Council composition
- Permanent members: China; France; Russia; United Kingdom; United States
- Non-permanent members: Brazil; Cape Verde; Djibouti; Hungary; Japan; Morocco; New Zealand; Pakistan; Spain; Venezuela

United Nations Security Council resolution 823, adopted unanimously on 30 April 1993, after reaffirming resolutions 696 (1991), 747 (1992), 785 (1992), 793 (1992), 804 (1993) and 811 (1993), the Council expressed support for the ongoing peace talks in Abidjan between the Government of Angola and UNITA under United Nations auspices and decided to extend the mandate of the United Nations Angola Verification Mission II (UNAVEM II) until 31 May 1993.

At the same time, concern was expressed at continuing attacks against international humanitarian flights, noting the recent shooting down of World Food Programme plane in the east of the country by UNITA rebels. The Council demanded that the safety and security of these flights and of UNAVEM II is ensured.

The resolution also requested the Secretary-General Boutros Boutros-Ghali to submit a report on the situation in Angola and the future role of the United Nations in the country, including an expansion of the United Nations presence in Angola.

== See also ==
- Angolan Civil War
- List of United Nations Security Council Resolutions 801 to 900 (1993–1994)
- United Nations Angola Verification Mission III
