= United Nations Security Council Resolution 1118 =

UN Security Council Resolution 1118
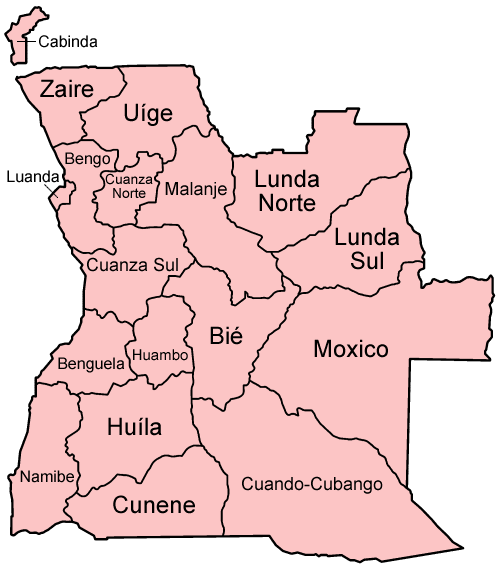
- Provinces of Angola
- Date: 30 June 1997
- Meeting no.: 3,795
- Code: S/RES/1118 (Document)
- Subject: The situation in Angola
- Voting summary: 15 voted for; None voted against; None abstained
- Result: Adopted

Security Council composition
- Permanent members: China; France; Russia; United Kingdom; United States
- Non-permanent members: Chile; Costa Rica; Egypt; Guinea-Bissau; Japan; Kenya; South Korea; Poland; Portugal; Sweden

United Nations Security Council resolution 1118, adopted unanimously on 30 June 1997, after reaffirming Resolution 696 (1991) and all subsequent resolutions on Angola, the council established the United Nations Observer Mission in Angola (MONUA) to supersede the United Nations Angola Verification Mission III (UNAVEM III).

The security council recognised the important contribution that UNAVEM III peacekeepers had made to the peace process in Angola. Meanwhile, a government of national unity and reconciliation was formed in which UNITA was included. Both parties had to continue with the implementation of the remaining political and military tasks, while concern was expressed at UNITA attacks on UNAVEM III personnel and tension in the northeastern provinces.

It was then decided that, from 1 July 1997, MONUVA would be established for an initial period ending on 31 October 1997, with the expectation that the mission would terminate by 1 February 1998. MONUA was also given responsibility for all components of UNAVEM III that still remained in Angola. Both the Government of Angola and UNITA were called upon to refrain from violence and inform MONUA of all troop movements. It also demanded that UNITA provide the Joint Commission complete information with regard to its military forces, including the security detachment of the leader of the largest opposition party, the so-called "mining police", armed UNITA personnel returning from outside the national boundaries, and any other armed UNITA personnel not previously reported to the United Nations, so that they could be disarmed and demobilised.

The Secretary-General Kofi Annan was requested to report on the situation by 15 August 1997.

== See also ==
- Angolan Civil War
- List of United Nations Security Council Resolutions 1101 to 1200 (1997–1998)
- United Nations Angola Verification Mission I
- United Nations Angola Verification Mission II
- United Nations Angola Verification Mission III
