= United Nations Security Council Resolution 811 =

UN Security Council Resolution 811
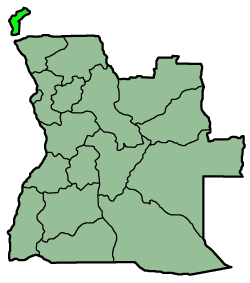
- Cabinda Province in Angola
- Date: 12 March 1993
- Meeting no.: 3,182
- Code: S/RES/811 (Document)
- Subject: Angola
- Voting summary: 15 voted for; None voted against; None abstained
- Result: Adopted

Security Council composition
- Permanent members: China; France; Russia; United Kingdom; United States
- Non-permanent members: Brazil; Cape Verde; Djibouti; Hungary; Japan; Morocco; New Zealand; Pakistan; Spain; Venezuela

United Nations Security Council resolution 811, adopted unanimously on 12 March 1993, after reaffirming resolutions 696 (1991), 747 (1992), 785 (1992), 793 (1992) and 804 (1993), the Council expressed its concern at recent fighting and condemned the violations of the "Acordos de Paz" peace agreement in Angola by UNITA, including its rejection of election results and negotiations in addition to its resumption of hostilities.

The resolution demanded UNITA accept the election results and that both it and the Government of Angola produce evidence that they, particularly UNITA, have implemented the "Acordos de Paz", by 30 March 1993. It also demanded a ceasefire throughout the country and to enter into dialogue, reaffirming that it will hold responsible any party which refuses to take part in such a dialogue.

The Council then condemned verbal and physical attacks against Margaret Anstee, Special Representative of the Secretary-General Boutros Boutros-Ghali and the United Nations Angola Verification Mission II (UNAVEM II), including the kidnapping of one member of UNAVEM II in Cabinda Province, further demanding that all parties ensure the safety of all United Nations personnel.

The resolution invited Boutros-Ghali to organise a meeting at the highest level between the two parties before 30 April 1993, and to consider the future of the United Nations in Angola as a whole. It concluded by calling on all United Nations agencies, Member States and international humanitarian organisations to provide economic, material and technical assistance in addition to humanitarian aid to the civilian population. This provision was added to the resolution after concerns about the humanitarian situation in Angola by Margaret Anstee.

== See also ==
- Angolan Civil War
- Angolan legislative election, 1992
- Angolan presidential election, 1992
- List of United Nations Security Council Resolutions 801 to 900 (1993–1994)
- United Nations Angola Verification Mission III
