= United Nations Security Council Resolution 864 =

UN Security Council Resolution 864
- Flag of UNITA
- Date: 15 September 1993
- Meeting no.: 3,277
- Code: S/RES/864 (Document)
- Subject: The situation in Angola
- Voting summary: 15 voted for; None voted against; None abstained
- Result: Adopted

Security Council composition
- Permanent members: China; France; Russia; United Kingdom; United States
- Non-permanent members: Brazil; Cape Verde; Djibouti; Hungary; Japan; Morocco; New Zealand; Pakistan; Spain; Venezuela

United Nations Security Council resolution 864, adopted unanimously on 15 September 1993, after reaffirming resolutions 696 (1991), 747 (1992), 785 (1992), 793 (1992), 804 (1993), 811 (1993), 823 (1993), 834 (1993) and 851 (1993), the Council noted the continuing situation in Angola and went on to condemn and place international sanctions on UNITA.

The Security Council expressed its concern about the deteriorating political, military and humanitarian situation in Angola and that, despite all previous resolutions and efforts, peace talks were suspended and no ceasefire was in effect. Support was given to the efforts of the Secretary-General and his Special Representative Margaret Anstee to help resolve the crisis through negotiations. The United Nations, therefore, would continue to be present in Angola in order to secure full implementation of the "Acordos de Paz" peace agreements.

The resolution extended the current mandate of the United Nations Angola Verification Mission II (UNAVEM II) until 15 December 1993. In the event of significant progress in the peace process, the presence would be increased. The position of the Angolan government to resolve the conflict peacefully was welcomed, while UNITA was reminded to accept the results of the 1992 elections. UNITA was also condemned for its military actions and attempts to seize territory which had caused suffering to the civilian population and Angolan economy, with the Council demanding that all such actions cease. Attacks by UNITA on United Nations humanitarian personnel in violation of international humanitarian law were condemned, urging both UNITA and the Government of Angola to ensure the safety of UNAVEM II staff and other humanitarian personnel. The council also reiterated its demand that UNITA release all foreign hostages held against their will.

The Council continued by strongly condemning UNITA, holding its leadership responsible for not complying with previous Security Council resolutions. In this regard, it determined UNITA's actions and the situation in Angola to be a threat to international peace and security and imposed sanctions on UNITA under Chapter VII of the United Nations Charter. Therefore, within 10 days following the adoption of the current resolution, the following measures would take effect unless the Secretary-General reported that a ceasefire was in force and an agreement on the implementation of the peace agreement and United Nations resolutions had been reached. If the ceasefire or agreements were not observed, the sanctions would be reimposed and take effect immediately. All countries were prohibited from selling arms, petroleum and related products to UNITA, except for some places that were determined by the Angolan government, notwithstanding any international agreements, commitments, contracts or licenses. Proceedings would be brought against any persons or entities violating the resolution.

A Committee of the Security Council was then established which would monitor implementation of Resolution 864. Its functions were to:

(a) examine reports by the Secretary-General;
(b) seek further information from countries regarding what action they are taking to implement the current resolution;
(c) consider information concerning violations of the sanctions;
(d) make periodic reports on the violations and implementation of Resolution 864;
(e) devise guidelines that facilitate exports.

The Council called upon all states to report to the Secretary-General by 15 October 1993 on the measures they had adopted, providing all necessary assistance to the committee. The imposition of further measures including travel restrictions and trade measures would be considered if no ceasefire had been agreed and the peace agreements were not implemented, or reviewed, if the agreement and ceasefire had been carried out.

The resolution concluded by requesting Secretary-General Boutros Boutros-Ghali to report back on the implementation of the current resolution and other developments by 1 November 1993 and 15 December 1993, including on recommendations for the future role of the United Nations in the peace process.

== See also ==
- United Nations Security Council Resolution 1173
- Angolan Civil War
- Angolan legislative election, 1992
- Angolan presidential election, 1992
- List of United Nations Security Council Resolutions 801 to 900 (1993–1994)
- United Nations Angola Verification Mission III
- Fowler Report
- Kimberley Process Certification Scheme
