= United Nations Security Council Resolution 976 =

UN Security Council Resolution 976
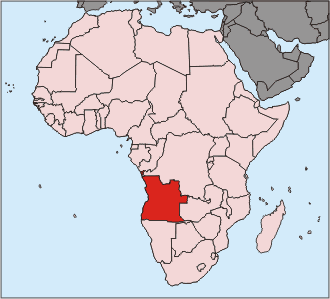
- Angola within Africa
- Date: 8 February 1995
- Meeting no.: 3,499
- Code: S/RES/976 (Document)
- Subject: Angola
- Voting summary: 15 voted for; None voted against; None abstained
- Result: Adopted

Security Council composition
- Permanent members: China; France; Russia; United Kingdom; United States
- Non-permanent members: Argentina; Botswana; Czech Republic; Germany; Honduras; Indonesia; Italy; Nigeria; Oman; Rwanda

United Nations Security Council resolution 976, adopted unanimously on 8 February 1995, after reaffirming resolutions 696 (1991) and all subsequent resolutions on Angola, the Council authorised the establishment of a new peacekeeping mission in the country, the United Nations Angola Verification Mission III (UNAVEM III) with an initial mandate ending on 8 August 1995.

The Lusaka Protocol was signed on 20 November 1994 and its importance and implementation was stressed to the Government of Angola and UNITA. The council also welcomed that a ceasefire had been in effect and was being observed. However, the protocol's implementation was behind schedule and the leaders of both parties–José Eduardo dos Santos and Jonas Savimbi, were urged build political momentum in order to successfully the agreement. Angola had offered to contribute substantially to the cost of the United Nations peacekeeping operation in the country, and this was commended by the Security Council. Additionally, a delegation from the Organisation of African Unity had visited the country.

UNAVEM III was then established to help restore peace and promote national reconciliation. It had a maximum deployment of 7,000 troops, 350 military observers and 260 police observers. The latter two groups would be immediately deployed to monitor the ceasefire, while the infantry units would be deployed when there was a cessation of hostilities, a provision of all relevant military data and where UNITA's forces would be placed. The importance of a mine clearance programme and establishment a United Nations radio station was stressed. The Secretary-General Boutros Boutros-Ghali was requested to report monthly on the mandate of UNAVEM III and the implementation of the Lusaka Protocol. If the parties did not co-operate, the role of the United Nations in Angola would be reviewed; if there was co-operation, UNAVEM III would be terminated after the Lusaka Protocol was fully implemented, expected by February 1997.

The contributions of Member States, United Nations agencies and non-governmental organisations was welcomed, with the Council reaffirming that all countries that they were to observe the arms embargo on UNITA in place since Resolution 864 (1993). A total ban on weapons was rejected by Brazil and Russia. In this regard, both parties were urged to cease acquisition of arms and matériel and instead devote resources for humanitarian needs. Angola was also asked to sign a Status of Forces Agreement with the United Nations by 20 March 1995. Finally, all parties were required to ensure the safety, security and freedom of movement of UNAVEM III and other personnel.

== See also ==
- Angolan Civil War
- List of United Nations Security Council Resolutions 901 to 1000 (1994–1995)
- United Nations Angola Verification Mission I
- United Nations Angola Verification Mission II
