= United Nations Security Council Resolution 1221 =

UN Security Council Resolution 1221
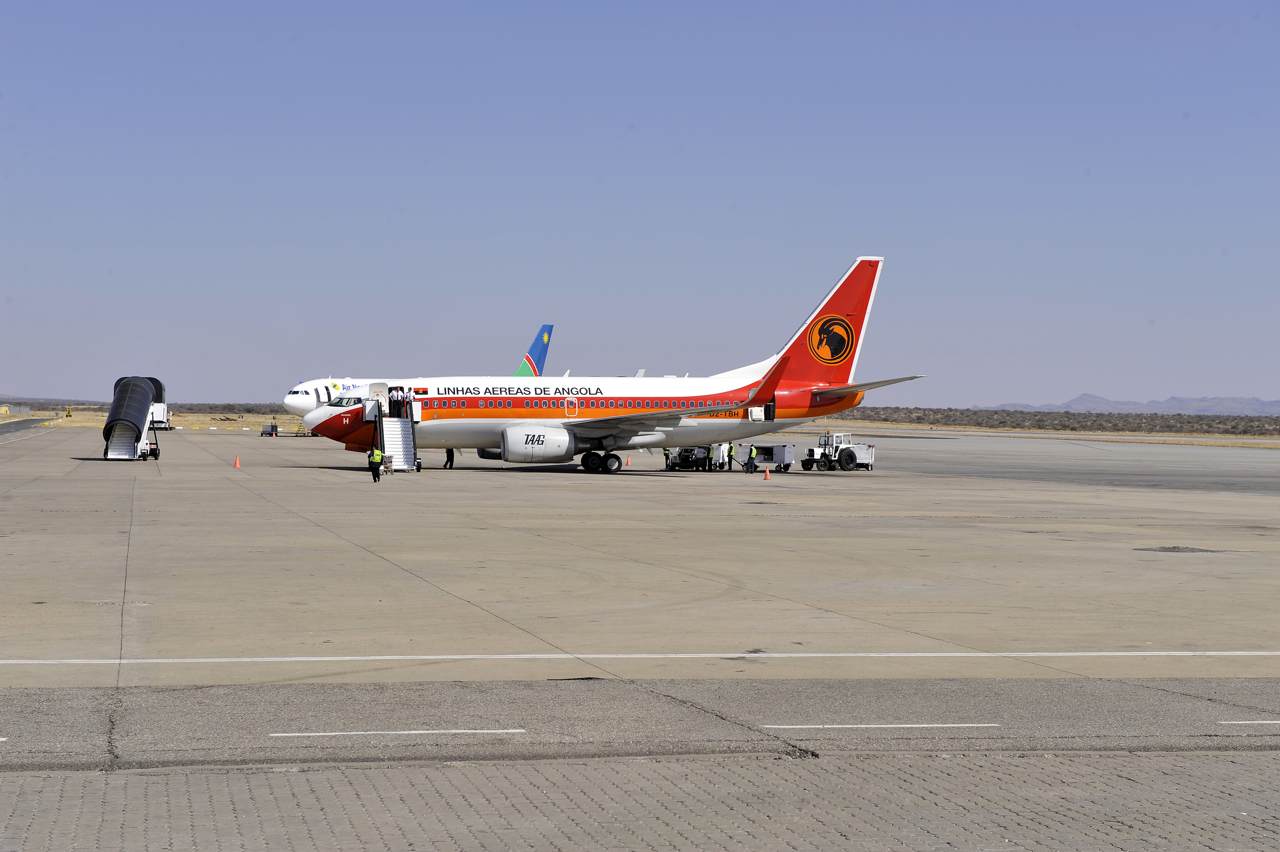
- TAAG Angola Airlines plane
- Date: 12 January 1999
- Meeting no.: 3,965
- Code: S/RES/1221 (Document)
- Subject: The situation in Angola
- Voting summary: 15 voted for; None voted against; None abstained
- Result: Adopted

Security Council composition
- Permanent members: China; France; Russia; United Kingdom; United States
- Non-permanent members: Argentina; Bahrain; Brazil; Canada; Gabon; Gambia; Malaysia; Namibia; Netherlands; Slovenia

United Nations Security Council resolution 1221, adopted unanimously on 12 January 1999, after reaffirming Resolution 696 (1991) and all subsequent resolutions on Angola, particularly resolutions 1196 (1998) and 1219 (1998), the Council condemned the downing of two commercial planes over UNITA-controlled territory in Angola and demanded that UNITA leader Jonas Savimbi co-operate in the search for survivors of the recent plane crashes.

The Security Council expressed outrage at the downing of a second Transafrik International aircraft over UNITA-controlled territory on 2 January 1999, which had brought the total number of aircraft lost in recent months to six. There was concern over the fate of the passengers and crew on board the aircraft and the loss of life. It deplored the lack of co-operation by UNITA in clarifying the circumstances of the incidents and in permitting United Nations search and rescue missions; such attacks were unacceptable and unjustifiable.

Acting under Chapter VII of the United Nations Charter, the Council condemned the suspicious circumstances under which two United Nations chartered aircraft and other commercial aircraft were downed and demanded that all such attacks cease immediately. It reaffirmed its commitment to establishing the truth surrounding all the incidents through an objective international investigation, which UNITA had to co-operate with.

The resolution reiterated that Jonas Savimibi co-operate with the United Nations and in the search for possible survivors after it was concluded he had not complied with Resolution 1219. It welcomed the commitment of the Angolan government to assist in the search and rescue for possible survivors and the International Civil Aviation Organization (ICAO) was requested to assist in the investigation.

All countries were reminded to comply in the implementation of sanctions against UNITA imposed in resolutions 864 (1993), 1127 (1997) and 1173 (1998), with the council stating it would deal with violations and consider the imposition of additional measures, including in the area of telecommunications. Finally, the chairman of the committee established in Resolution 864 was asked to consult with the Organisation of African Unity and the Southern African Development Community on enforcement of the sanctions.

== See also ==
- Angolan Civil War
- List of United Nations Security Council Resolutions 1201 to 1300 (1998–2000)
