= United Nations Security Council Resolution 626 =

UN Security Council Resolution 626
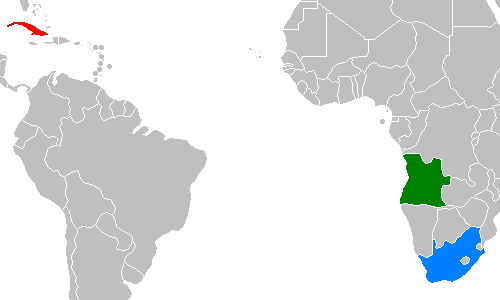
- Cuba (red), Angola (green) and South Africa (blue)
- Date: 20 December 1988
- Meeting no.: 2,834
- Code: S/RES/626 (Document)
- Subject: Angola
- Voting summary: 15 voted for; None voted against; None abstained
- Result: Adopted

Security Council composition
- Permanent members: China; France; Soviet Union; United Kingdom; United States
- Non-permanent members: Algeria; Argentina; Brazil; Italy; Japan; Nepal; Senegal; West Germany; Yugoslavia; Zambia

United Nations Security Council resolution 626, adopted unanimously on 20 December 1988, after noting an agreement between Angola and Cuba regarding the withdrawal of Cuban troops from Angola and considering a report by the Secretary-General, the Council endorsed the report and established the United Nations Angola Verification Mission I for a period of thirty-one months.

The Council decided the mission would enter into force once the tripartite accord between Angola, Cuba and South Africa had been signed as well as the agreement between Angola and Cuba, requesting the Secretary-General to report to the Council immediately after the agreement was signed.

On 22 December 1988, both bipartite and tripartite agreements were signed in New York City, which helped pave the way for the independence of Namibia and the withdrawal of 50,000 Cuban troops from Angola.

== See also ==
- Angolan Civil War
- Angola–South Africa relations
- Brazzaville Protocol
- Cuban intervention in Angola
- Establishment of United Nations Angola Verification Mission II in Resolution 696 (1991)
- List of United Nations Security Council Resolutions 601 to 700 (1987–1991)
- South African Border Wars
- Apartheid
- United Nations Security Council Resolution 602
