= United Nations Security Council Resolution 804 =

UN Security Council Resolution 804
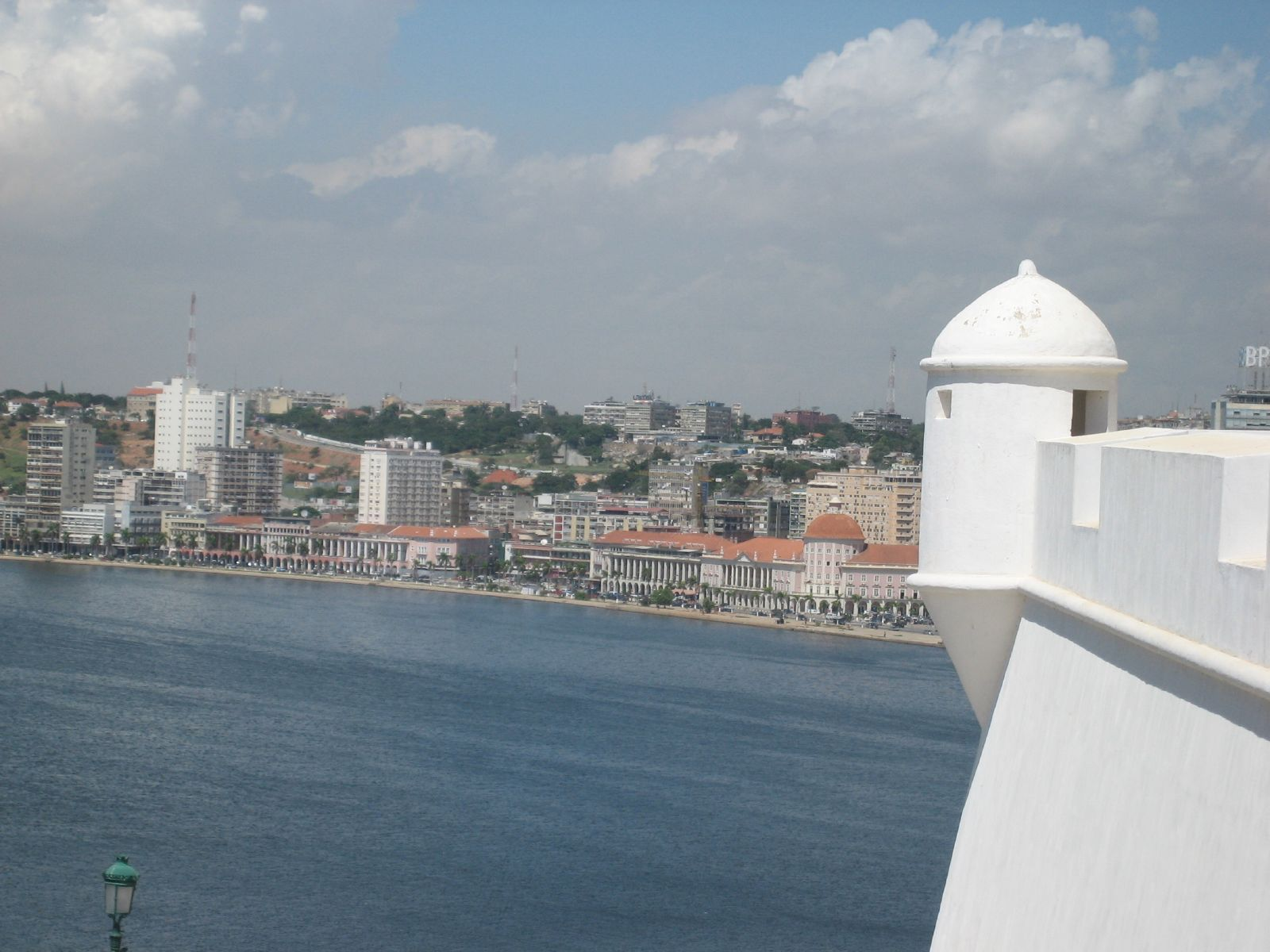
- Angolan capital Luanda
- Date: 29 January 1993
- Meeting no.: 3,168
- Code: S/RES/804 (Document)
- Subject: Angola
- Voting summary: 15 voted for; None voted against; None abstained
- Result: Adopted

Security Council composition
- Permanent members: China; France; Russia; United Kingdom; United States
- Non-permanent members: Brazil; Cape Verde; Djibouti; Hungary; Japan; Morocco; New Zealand; Pakistan; Spain; Venezuela

United Nations Security Council resolution 804, adopted unanimously on 29 January 1993, after reaffirming resolutions 696 (1991), 747 (1992), 785 (1992) and 793 (1992), and expressing its concern at lack of implementation of the "Acordos de Paz para Angola" in Angola, the council approved a recommendation by the Secretary-General Boutros Boutros-Ghali to extend the mandate of the United Nations Angola Verification Mission II (UNAVEM II) for a further three months until 30 April 1993.

The resolution condemned the violation of the "Acordos de Paz para Angola" peace agreement, including the resumption of hostilities during the 55 Day War, the initial rejection by UNITA of the election results, its withdrawal from the new Angolan armed forces and its seizure by force of provincial capitals and municipalities. It demanded that all parties cease fire, return to negotiations and agree to the full implementation of the peace agreement. The council also supported the efforts of the Secretary-General Boutros Boutros-Ghali and the special representative for their continuing efforts in this respect. It was the first time that resolutions on Angola had criticised UNITA.

The resolution went on to consider the effect of member states on the peace process. It urged them to provide economic and technical assistance to the government of Angola and to support the implementation of the peace accords, and to prevent any direct or indirect interference from military or paramilitary forces. The security council also condemned the violations of international humanitarian law, seizure of foreign hostages and attacks on UNAVEM II, demanding that the Angolan government ensure its safety.

Resolution 804 concluded by deploying UNAVEM II primarily in the capital Luanda, partly due to demands by African nations for a greater United Nations presence, requesting the Secretary-General to review developments and report back to the council before 30 April 1993.

== See also ==
- 55 Day War
- Angolan Civil War
- Angolan legislative election, 1992
- Angolan presidential election, 1992
- List of United Nations Security Council Resolutions 801 to 900 (1993–1994)
- United Nations Angola Verification Mission III
