= Apurba Kumar Bardalai =

Retired Indian military officer

Major General Apurba Kumar Bardalai VSM
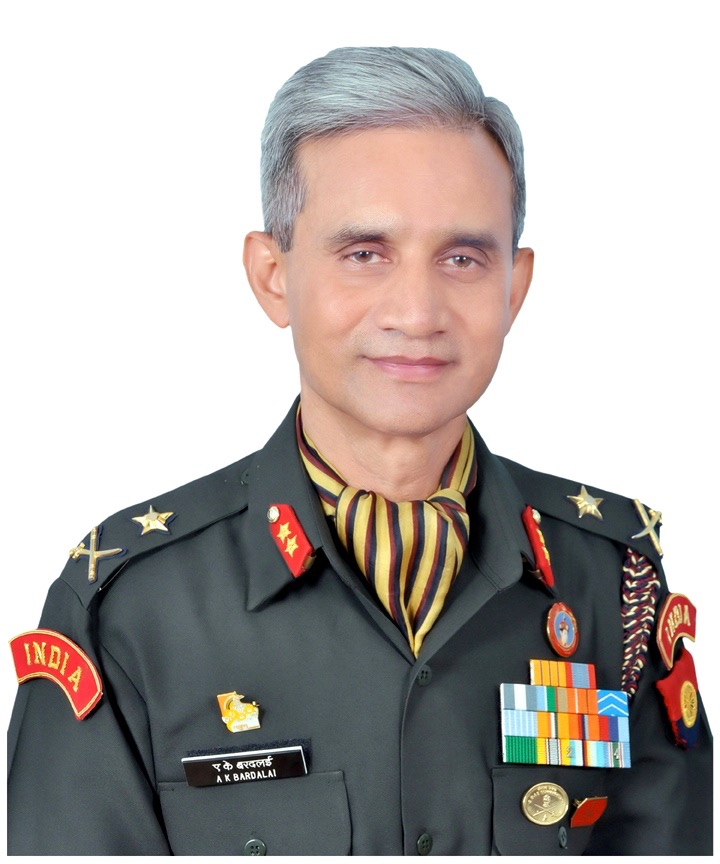
- Apurba Kumar Bardalai as Commandant of the Indian Military Training Team in 2013
- Born: 4 April 1956 (age 70)
- Military career
- Allegiance: India
- Branch: Indian Army
- Service years: 1977 – 2014
- Rank: Major General
- Nicknames: Tony, Bardi
- Service number: IC-34421P
- Unit: Rajput Regiment
- Commands: Indian Military Training Team; 22nd Infantry Division; 82nd Mountain Brigade; 15th Battalion The Rajput Regiment
- Awards: Vishisht Seva Medal

Apurba Kumar Bardalai (born 4 April 1956), is a retired Major General from the Indian Army. He holds a PhD from Tilburg University, where he is a Member of the Department of Organisation Studies. He is also a Distinguished Fellow at the United Service Institution of India, New Delhi.

== Career ==
Having completed his training at the National Defence Academy and Indian Military Academy, Dehradun, Apurba Kumar Bardalai was commissioned into the 15th Battalion, the Rajput Regiment on 11 June 1977. Apurba Kumar Bardalai has served on foreign assignments including as Deputy Head of the Mission & Deputy Force Commander at the United Nations Interim Force in Lebanon and as the Commandant of the Indian Military Training Team at Bhutan.

== Dates of rank ==
Insignia	Rank	Component	Date of rank
	Second Lieutenant	Indian Army	11 June 1977
	Lieutenant	Indian Army	11 June 1979
	Captain	Indian Army	11 June 1980
	Major	Indian Army	11 June 1988
	Lieutenant-Colonel	Indian Army	1 April 1995
	Colonel	Indian Army	23 May 1996
	Brigadier	Indian Army	8 December 2005
	Major General	Indian Army	1 May 2010

== Writing ==
Specialising in United Nations peacekeeping, Defence and Security, Apurba Kumar Bardalai has published one book, a PhD Thesis and several Journal Articles and other academic research material in his field.

In addition to his published works, he has delivered several lectures and public speeches on his subject of expertise, at various institutions.

Year	Title of Work	Book / Publisher / Organisation	Type
2006	Changing Security Scenario: Implications for UN Peacekeeping	Knowledge World (for United Service Institution of India)	Book
2023	Keeping the Peace: UN Peace Operations and their Effectiveness: An Assessment	Pentagon Press	Book
2021	United Nations Interim Force in Lebanon: Assessment and Way Forward	Tilburg University	Doctoral Thesis
2018	UN Peacekeeping Operations: Perspective of an Indian Peacekeeper.	Aoun, E., P.I.E. Peter Lang.	Book Chapter
2023	Ecology and Boundary: Mapping Overlapping Terrain.	External Dimensions of Security of the North East Region, ed. Temjenmeren Ao	Book Chapter
2024	On the Geoeconomics Drivers of International Conflicts	Global Political Economy, Geopolitics and International Security: The World in Permacrisis, edited by O. Mishra and S. Sen	Book Chapter
2015	India and Humanitarian Assistance in Post Conflict Peace Building.	Centre for Land Warfare Studies (CLAWS), New Delhi	Issue Brief
2016	UNIFIL: The many challenges of successful peacekeeping, Journal of Defence Studies, 2016.	The Manohar Parrikar Institute for Defence Studies and Analyses (MP-IDSA)	Journal Article
2018	UNPKO and Military Contributions: Challenges and Opportunities for Asia-Pacific Governments.	United Service Institution of India	Journal Article
2018	United Nations Peacekeeping Operations: Causes for Failure and Continuing Relevance.	Manohar Parrikar Institute for Defence Studies and Analyses (MP-IDSA)	Journal Article
2018	Doklam and the Indo-China Boundary, Journal of Defence Studies.	Manohar Parrikar Institute for Defence Studies and Analyses (MP-IDSA)	Journal Article
2019	A Conceptual Framework for Assessing Traditional Peace Operations.	Manohar Parrikar Institute for Defence Studies and Analyses (MP-IDSA)	Journal Article
2021	Challenges to UN Peacebuilding.	United Service Institution of India	Journal Article
2022	UN Peacekeeping and Ambiguity in Normative UN Norms.	The Manohar Parrikar Institute for Defence Studies and Analyses (MP-IDSA)	Journal Article
2022	Ukraine Conflict: Is UN peacekeeping an option?	Hesperus Research & Development Organization (HRDO)	Journal Article
2023	Traditional UN Peace Operation: Preventive Deployment for Conflict Management	Institute for Conflict Management, New Delhi	Journal Article
2023	Private Military Contractors: The Dogs of War	Medals and Ribbons	Journal Article
2023	Capability Building of UN Peace Operations	United Service Institution of India	Journal Article
2024	Role of UN Peace Operations: An Actor of Stability in the Middle East	Indian Army - UN Journal 2024	Journal Article
2020	Under the Blue Helmet.	States of Anarchy	Podcast Episode
2024	United Nations Truce Supervision Organization: Role, Relevance, Functions and Utility - Lessons for Future Peace Operations	Geneva Centre for Security Policy and Effectiveness of Peace Operations Network	Report
2016	Review of United Nations Peacekeeping Challenge: The Importance of the Integrated Approach.	Journal of Defence Studies, The Manohar Parrikar Institute for Defence Studies and Analyses (MP-IDSA)	Book Review

== Honours and decorations ==
For his dedication to duty as the Commander of a Mountain Brigade, Apurba Kumar Bardalai was awarded the Vishisht Seva Medal on Republic Day, 2008.

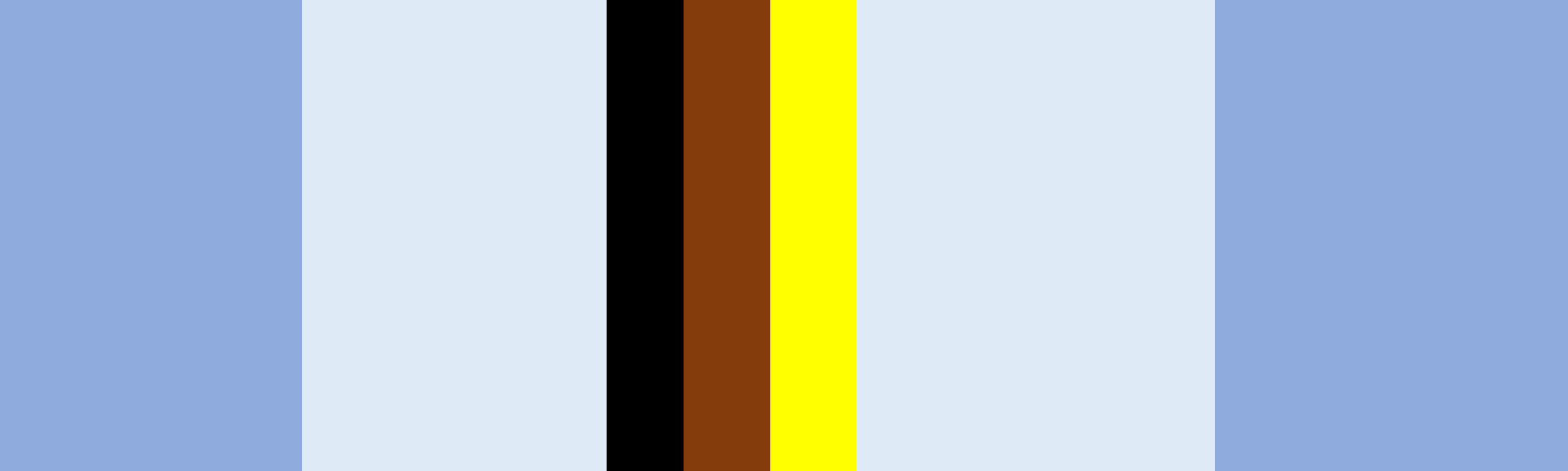

Vishisht Seva Medal		Special Service Medal	
Siachen Glacier Medal	Operation Parakram Medal	Sainya Seva Medal	High Altitude Service Medal
Videsh Seva Medal	50th Anniversary of Independence Medal	30 Years Long Service Medal	20 Years Long Service Medal
9 Years Long Service Medal	UNAVEM I Medal	UNAVEM II Medal	United Nations Interim Force in Lebanon Medal
