= 55 Day War =

Conflict of the Angolan Civil War

- Part of the Angolan Civil War
Date	9 January 1993 – 6 March 1993 (56 days)
Location	Huambo, Angola
Result	UNITA victory

Belligerents
Angolan Armed Forces	UNITA

Commanders and leaders
João de Matos; Higino Carneiro	Jonas Savimbi; Demosthenes Amos Chilingutila

Strength
	20,000 soldiers 8,000–10,000 militia

Casualties and losses
12,000 killed 5,000 captured (UNITA claim); 40 tanks (UNITA claim)	
- At least 10,000 soldiers killed 5,000 civilians 200,000 displaced

The 55-day war was a battle in the city of Huambo between the rebel forces of UNITA led by Arlindo Pena and the MPLA-led Angolan government. The 55-day war lasted between 9 January 1993 and 6 March 1993, resulting in UNITA emerging victorious and the destruction of most of the city.

== Background ==
After UNITA’s defeat in the 1992 Angolan general election, UNITA rejected the election outcome and resumed hostilities. After the eruption of Hostilities, UNITA began a new offensive, this offensive targeted a number of provincial capitals including Kuito, Huambo, Malange, Luena, and Menongue, and aimed to force the MPLA into further concessions.

== Battle ==
The battle began on 9 January 1993 when UNITA launched an assault to take the city with 20,000 soldiers and 8,000-10,000 armed militia. UNTIA was able to take the city before being driven out of most of the city the same day, fighting remained in the residential areas of the city, and by January 11 100 people had already been killed. UNITA soon launch another attack to take the city leading to heavy fighting. Two members of the United Nations monitoring force were injured in the fighting. UNITA claimed to have destroyed an ammunition depo on 16 January. By 19 January UNITA had surrounded the city and had claimed to have destroyed 12 T-55s and shot down a Sukhoi Su-25 fighter jet.

On 2 February 1993, shelling killed 40 residents. By February 11 2,000 people are said to have been killed in fighting in the city. On 13 February, government forces began withdrawing from the city center and UNTIA started to gain the upper hand and held 3/4 of the city including the airfield and barracks. A government counter-attack on the 13th was able to regain some lost territory. The Angolan government claimed that 1,000 people were killed on 15 February when UNITA shelled a civilian convoy leading out of the city. By 16 February 10,000 people are said to have been killed since the fighting began. By February 18, government forces held only a small part of the city.

On 10 February 500 civilians were killed in heavy fighting and shelling. 10,500 had been so far killed in the fighting. On 26 February UNITA agreed with the UN to allow humanitarian aid to land at Huambo airport. On 1 March, the government claimed UNITA massacred 45 civilians and dumped their bodies into the river. On 8 March UNITA overran the last government stronghold claiming to have captured 5,000 government troops.

== See also ==
- Angolan Civil War
- 1992 Angolan legislative election
- 1992 Angolan presidential election
