= João de Matos =

Angolan military general

- Born: 30 May 1955
- Died: 4 November 2017 (aged 62); Spain

João de Matos (May 30, 1955 – November 4, 2017) was an Angolan military general. He led the Angolan force during the Second Congo War to support Joseph Kabila's regime. He died of pancreatic cancer in Spain in 2017.
