= United Nations Security Council Resolution 793 =

UN Security Council Resolution 793
- Angola
- Date: 30 November 1992
- Meeting no.: 3,144
- Code: S/RES/793 (Document)
- Subject: Angola
- Voting summary: 15 voted for; None voted against; None abstained
- Result: Adopted

Security Council composition
- Permanent members: China; France; Russia; United Kingdom; United States
- Non-permanent members: Austria; Belgium; Cape Verde; Ecuador; Hungary; India; Japan; Morocco; Venezuela; Zimbabwe

United Nations Security Council resolution 793, adopted unanimously on 30 November 1992, after recalling resolutions 696 (1991), 747 (1992) and 785 (1992), and expressing its concern at the deteriorating political situation and the resumption of hostilities in Angola, the Council approved a recommendation by the Secretary-General Boutros Boutros-Ghali to extend the mandate of the United Nations Angola Verification Mission II (UNAVEM II) for a further two months until 31 January 1993.

The resolution appealed to the personnel contributing to UNAVEM II in order to restore as soon as possible its mandated strength, and welcomed the joint declaration of the Government of Angola and UNITA made in Namibe (today's Moçâmedes), urging both to take immediate and effective actions in accordance with the declaration.

The Council then condemned any resumption of hostilities and demanded that they cease immediately, further calling on all states to refrain from actions that could jeopardise the peace agreements signed. It called on both parties to meet their obligations under the "Acordos de Paz" (peace accord) with regard to the confinement of their troops, demobilisation, and the formation of the unified national armed forces, urging continuous dialogue throughout.

Finally, the resolution required the Secretary-General to submit a report on the situation in Angola together with long-term recommendations of UNAVEM II in the peace process by 31 January 1993.

== See also ==
- Angolan Civil War
- Angolan legislative election, 1992
- Angolan presidential election, 1992
- List of United Nations Security Council Resolutions 701 to 800 (1991–1993)
- United Nations Angola Verification Mission III
