= United Nations Security Council Resolution 785 =

UN Security Council Resolution 785
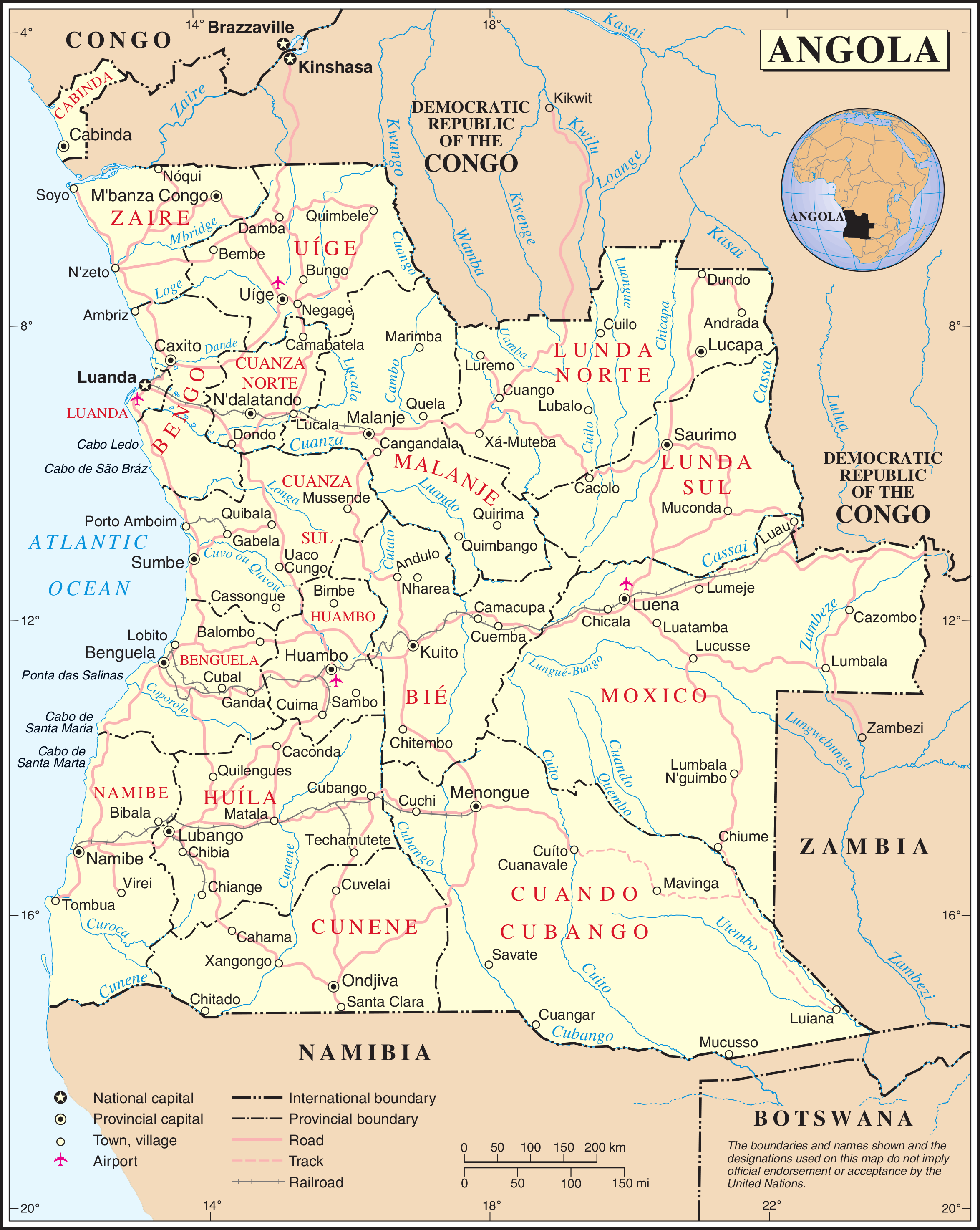
- Angola
- Date: 30 October 1992
- Meeting no.: 3,130
- Code: S/RES/785 (Document)
- Subject: Angola
- Voting summary: 15 voted for; None voted against; None abstained
- Result: Adopted

Security Council composition
- Permanent members: China; France; Russia; United Kingdom; United States
- Non-permanent members: Austria; Belgium; Cape Verde; Ecuador; Hungary; India; Japan; Morocco; Venezuela; Zimbabwe

United Nations Security Council resolution 785, adopted unanimously on 30 October 1992, after recalling resolutions 696 (1991) and 747 (1992), and expressing its concern at the deteriorating political situation and the resumption of hostilities by UNITA in Angola, the Council approved a recommendation by the Secretary-General Boutros Boutros-Ghali to extend the mandate of the United Nations Angola Verification Mission II (UNAVEM II) until 30 November 1992.

The Council then condemned any resumption of hostilities and demanded that they cease immediately, further calling on all states to refrain from actions that could jeopardise the peace agreements signed. It also condemned "baseless accusations" made by UNITA's radio station, Vorgan, against the Secretary-General, the Special Representative and UNAVEM II, whose work the Council commended.

The resolution supported the statement by Margaret Anstee, the Special Representative of the Secretary-General, certifying that the elections held on 29 and 30 September 1992, were generally free and fair and called upon UNITA and other parties to the electoral process in Angola to respect the results of the elections. It then urged the parties concerned to engage in dialogue to ensure the second round of the presidential elections takes place.

Finally, the resolution required the Secretary-General to submit a report on the situation in Angola together with long-term recommendations and financial implications on the mandate and strength of UNAVEM II by 30 November 1992.

== See also ==
- Angolan Civil War
- Angolan legislative election, 1992
- Angolan presidential election, 1992
- List of United Nations Security Council Resolutions 701 to 800 (1991–1993)
- United Nations Angola Verification Mission III
