= MONUA =

United Nations Observer Mission in Angola
- Abbreviation: MONUA
- Formation: 30 June 1997
- Type: Peacekeeping Mission
- Legal status: Terminated
- Head: Issa Diallo
- Parent organization: United Nations Security Council
- Website: www.un.org/Depts/DPKO/Missions/Monua/monua.htm

The United Nations Observer Mission in Angola (MONUA, Mission d'Observation des Nations Unies à l'Angola) was established by United Nations Security Council Resolution 1118 of 30 June 1997. Due to the collapse of the peace process in Angola, UN Secretary General recommended to the UN Security Council that MONUA's mandate not be renewed. The mission officially terminated in on 26 February 1999, per the terms of Resolution 1213.

MONUA was the last peacekeeping mission in Angola, and was preceded by three other peacekeeping missions: UNAVEM I, II and III.

The Angolan Civil War raged between 1974 and 2002 and was the longest lasting conflict in Africa.

At the beginning of the mission in 1997, the UN peacekeeping force consisted of approximately 3500 soldiers, observers and police constables, coming from 17 countries. This number was reduced to 400 in 1999, when the mission ended. Seventeen Blue Helmets died in the conflict.

== See also ==
- Angolan Civil War
- Timeline of United Nations peacekeeping missions
