= Margaret Anstee =

British diplomat and writer (1926–2016)

Dame Margaret Anstee DCMG
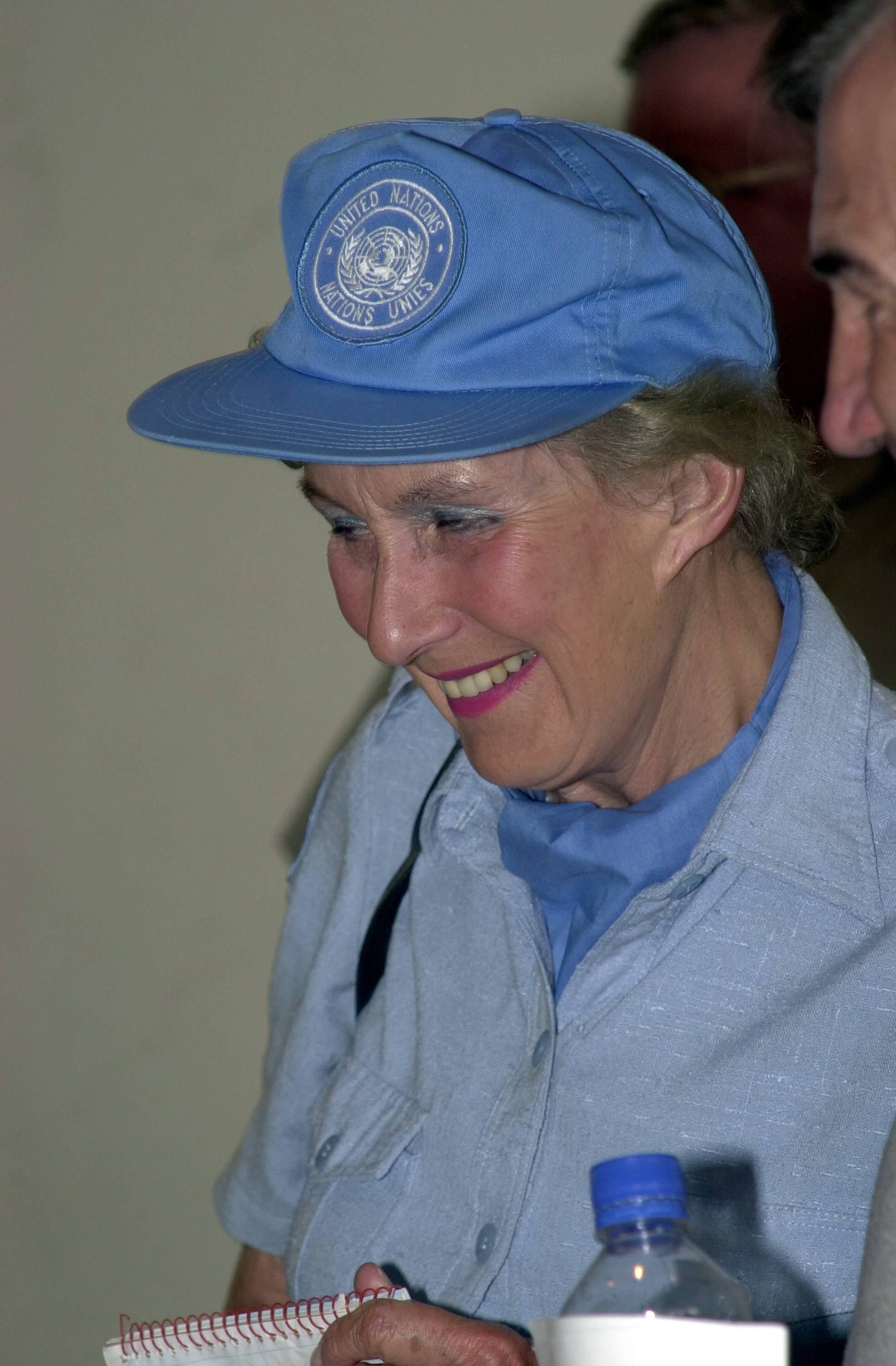
- Dame Margaret Anstee at the Honduran Military Academy in Tegucigalpa, Honduras
- Born: Margaret Joan Anstee; 25 June 1926; Writtle, Essex, England
- Died: 25 August 2016 (aged 90); Knill, Herefordshire, England
- Education: Newnham College, Cambridge; University of London
- Occupations: Diplomat at the United Nations (1952–1993)

Dame Margaret Joan Anstee, DCMG (25 June 1926 – 25 August 2016) was a British diplomat who served at the United Nations for over four decades (1952–93), rising to the rank of an Under-Secretary-General in 1987. She was the first woman to hold this position.

== Early life and education ==
Anstee was born on 25 June 1926 at 2 Albert Villas, Writtle, Essex, the only child of Edward Curtis Anstee, a printer, and Annie Adaliza Mills, a domestic servant. She grew up in the nearby city of Chelmsford and was educated at Chelmsford County High School for Girls. Neither of her parents had finished secondary school, but they encouraged her to complete her education. She went on to study at Newnham College, Cambridge, and graduated with first class honours in French and Spanish in 1944, although it was another three years before the university began admitting women to full degree status. Anstee continued her studies at the University of London.

== Career ==
She worked for a year as a university lecturer in Spanish at Queen's University, Belfast. In 1948, Anstee joined the Foreign Office where she worked as a third secretary on the Latin American desk. She worked for Donald Maclean prior to his defection.

She was engaged to Robin Mackworth-Young briefly but instead married Michael Rotherham Starkey on 5 May 1952. However, due to the Foreign Office's marriage bar policy in force at the time, which required women employees to resign when they married, this ended her career. Anstee accompanied her husband, a fellow British diplomat, to Singapore and Manila, Philippines.

=== United Nations ===
The marriage began to fail while the couple were based in Manila, and so in 1952, she took a position with the United Nations Technical Assistance Board in Manila as an administration officer in order to earn the money for a fare back to England. She and her husband returned to England in 1954 and Anstee worked part-time as a lecturer at Newnham. In 1956, she divorced her husband and rejoined the UN as acting head of the Technical Assistance Board in Bogotá, Colombia.

Anstee served successively as Resident Representative of the UN Development Programme (UNDP) in eight countries in Asia, Latin America and Africa. From 1974 to 1987 she occupied senior positions at the UN's New York City headquarters. She was also given major responsibilities in a number of disaster relief operations (Bangladesh 1973, Mexican earthquake 1985, Chernobyl nuclear disaster 1991–2, Kuwait burning oil wells 1991–2) as well as special assignments for the Secretary-General to assist countries in dire economic distress (Bolivia 1982–92, Peru 1990–92). In addition, she was involved in the design and implementation of several major reforms of the UN system. She was granted Bolivian citizenship in 1990.

Anstee worked on operational programmes of economic and social development in all regions of the world, mostly with the United Nations Development Programme. From 1987 to 1992 she served as Director-General of the United Nations Office at Vienna, Head of the Centre for Social Development and Humanitarian Affairs and Coordinator of all United Nations narcotic drug-control programs. From 1992 to 1993 she was the Secretary-General's Special Representative to Angola; she was the first woman to head a UN peacekeeping mission.

=== Later career ===
After leaving the UN in July 1993, she served as a Special Adviser to the government of Bolivia on matters relating to development and international finance. In 1994 she wrote a report for UNCTAD on the technical cooperation needs of developing countries in the wake of the completion of the Uruguay Round and led an Inter-American Development Bank mission to Bolivia on socio-economic reform. She wrote and lectured widely on the United Nations, particularly on issues related to development, peacekeeping, and UN reform. From 1996 she advised the Under-Secretary-General of the United Nations Department of Political Affairs, on a pro bono publico basis, on operational aspects of post-conflict peace-building.

She also chaired the Advisory Board of the Lessons Learned Unit of the UN Department of Peacekeeping Operations, and for some years actively took part in practical training in peacekeeping techniques for both military and civilian personnel, including simulation exercises, in the UK, Sweden, South America and the United States, South Africa and other African countries.

== Later life ==
Anstee established the Margaret Anstee Developing World Fund to assist graduate students at Newnham College with their fieldwork.

During the last three years of her life Margaret Anstee arranged to have weekly Welsh lessons in her home in Knill in the Welsh Marches. An essay portraying her by her Welsh tutor won a prize at the National Eisteddfod of Wales in 2019.

Anstee died on 25 August 2016 in her home in Knill, Herefordshire at the age of 90. She left a legacy to found what is now the Margaret Anstee Centre for Global Studies, based at Newnham College.

== Honours ==
In 1991, Anstee was made an Honorary Fellow of Newnham College, Cambridge. In 1993 she was awarded the Reves Peace Prize by the College of William & Mary (U.S.) and she held Honorary Doctorates in the UK from the Universities of Essex (1994), Westminster (1996), London (1998) and Cambridge (2004).

In the 1994 New Year Honours, Queen Elizabeth II made her a Dame Commander of the Most Distinguished Order of St Michael and St George. She has also been honoured by the governments of Austria, Bolivia and Morocco.

In 2011, Anstee was the inaugural recipient of the UNA – UK’s Sir Brian Urquhart Award for Distinguished Service to the United Nations, awarded in recognition of her contribution to the organisation.

== Writings ==
Gate of the Sun: a Prospect of Bolivia was published in Great Britain by Longman in 1970, and was later published in the United States under the title Bolivia: Gate of the Sun by Paul S. Eriksson. Orphan of the Cold War: the Inside Story of the Collapse of the Angolan Peace Process 1992–1993, was published in the UK and the US in October 1996. A Portuguese translation was published in April 1997. Her memoirs Never Learn to Type: A Woman at the United Nations was published in May 2003 by Wiley.

In 2009, she published a book The House on the Sacred Lake, describing her life in Bolivia.

Anstee also wrote a biography of John Brande Trend, one of her professors at Cambridge. It was published in 2013 as JB — An Unlikely Spanish Don: The Life and Times of Professor John Brande Trend.
