= United Nations Security Council Resolution 747 =

UN Security Council Resolution 747
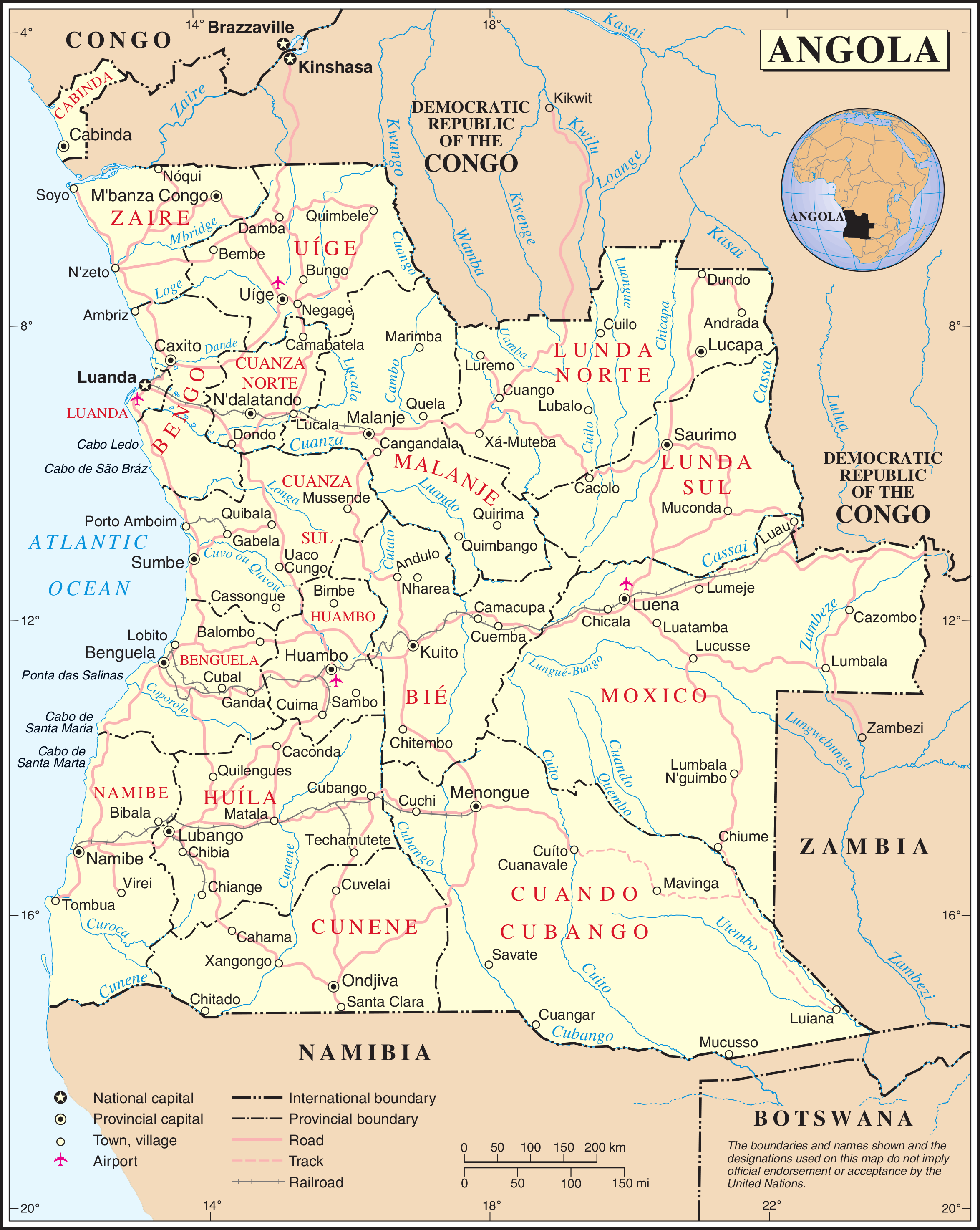
- Angola
- Date: 24 March 1992
- Meeting no.: 3,062
- Code: S/RES/747 (Document)
- Subject: Angola
- Voting summary: 15 voted for; None voted against; None abstained
- Result: Adopted

Security Council composition
- Permanent members: China; France; Russia; United Kingdom; United States
- Non-permanent members: Austria; Belgium; Cape Verde; Ecuador; Hungary; India; Japan; Morocco; Venezuela; Zimbabwe

United Nations Security Council resolution 747, adopted unanimously on 24 March 1992, after recalling Resolution 696 (1991) and noting a report by the Secretary-General Boutros Boutros-Ghali, the Council approved the report concerning observations of elections and an enlargement for the United Nations Angola Verification Mission II (UNAVEM II) in Angola.

By accepting the proposals, an additional 100 observers were sent to Angola and also tasking UNAVEM II with monitoring registration of voters, electoral campaigning and the verification of election results. However, it had very little resources in order to carry out its mandate.

The Council called on all the Angolan parties to co-operate with the Special Representative of the Secretary-General and abide by the principles set out in the Bicesse Accords. It also requested the parties finalise political, financial and legal preparations ahead of proposed September 1992 multi-party elections, encouraging Member States to contribute to the United Nations programmes to provide assistance and support the election process.

== See also ==
- Angolan Civil War
- Angolan legislative election, 1992
- Angolan presidential election, 1992
- List of United Nations Security Council Resolutions 701 to 800 (1991–1993)
- United Nations Angola Verification Mission III
