= Lusaka Protocol =

1994 attempt to end the Angolan Civil War

- Context: Angolan Civil War
- Signed: 20 November 1994
- Location: Lusaka, Zambia
- Parties: Government of Angola; UNITA

The Lusaka Protocol, initialed in Lusaka, Zambia on 31 October 1994, attempted to end the Angolan Civil War by integrating and disarming UNITA and starting national reconciliation. Both sides signed a truce as part of the protocol on 15 November 1994, and the treaty was signed on 20 November 1994.

== Negotiation ==
By late 1993 UNITA could operate and conduct raids in over 70% of Angola, but the government's military successes in 1994 forced UNITA to sue for peace. By November 1994 the government had taken control of 60% of the country. UNITA leader Jonas Savimbi called the situation UNITA's "deepest crisis" since its creation. Savimbi, unwilling to personally sign the accord, had former UNITA Secretary General Eugenio Manuvakola sign in his place and President José Eduardo dos Santos responded by having Angolan Foreign Minister Venancio de Moura represent the MPLA. According to Manuvakola, Savimbi wanted him to act as a scapegoat.

Zimbabwean President Robert Mugabe and South African President Nelson Mandela met in Lusaka on 15 November 1994 in a symbolic move to boost support for the protocol. Mugabe and Mandela both said they would be willing to meet with Savimbi; Mandela invited Savimbi to come to South Africa, but he did not go in fear of being arrested for war crimes.

== Treaty terms ==
Under the agreement the government and UNITA would ceasefire and demobilize. 5,500 UNITA members, including 180 militants, would join the Angolan National police, 1,200 UNITA members, including 40 militants, would join the rapid reaction police force, and UNITA generals would become officers in the Angolan Armed Forces. Foreign mercenaries would return to their home countries and all parties would stop acquiring foreign arms. The agreement gave UNITA politicians homes and a headquarters. The government agreed to appoint UNITA members to head the Mines, Commerce, Health, and Tourism ministries in addition to seven deputy ministers, ambassadors, the governorships of Uige, Lunda Sul, and Cuando Cubango, deputy governors, municipal administrators, deputy administrators, and commune administrators. The government would release all prisoners and give amnesty to all militants involved in the civil war.

The agreement created a joint commission, consisting of officials from the Angolan government, UNITA, and the UN with the governments of Portugal, the United States, and Russia observing, to oversee its implementation. Violations of the protocol's provisions would be discussed and reviewed by the commission.

The protocol's provisions, integrating UNITA into the military, a ceasefire, and a coalition government, were similar to those of the Alvor Agreement which granted Angola independence from Portugal in 1975. Many of the same environmental problems, mutual distrust between UNITA and the MPLA, loose international oversight, the importation of foreign arms, and an overemphasis on maintaining the balance of power, led to the protocol's collapse and the civil war.

The Bicesse Accords largely punished the weaker signatory while the Lusaka Protocol guaranteed UNITA's hold over important governorships.

== Implementation ==
United Nations Angola Verification Mission III and MONUA spent $1.5 billion overseeing implementation of the protocol. The UN largely did not enforce the provision prohibiting UNITA from buying foreign arms and both sides continued to build up their stockpile. The United Nations Security Council did not authorize a significant peacekeeping force in the area until 1995 and delayed full deployment until late 1996. U.N. Special Representative Blondin Beye covered up human rights violations because, as a UN official told Human Rights Watch in 1995, "the situation is too sensitive for serious human rights monitoring. Making public what we know could undermine the peace process and put us back to war." In May 1998 Beye changed his mind and the UN began reporting abuses. Three months after the government signed the treaty, in February 1995 Chief of Staff General João de Matos complained that peace would only be achieved when the government defeated UNITA militarily, calling the protocol a "mistake." By December 1998, the government and UNITA were again in a state of war. The UN's Human Rights Division did not publish any reports from January to July 1999 because fighting prevented them from investigating. Following the protocol the government and UNITA both engaged in the indiscriminate killing of civilians, torture, and other human rights violations.

Not only did UNITA not demobilize but it purchased a large amount of weapons in 1996 and 1997 from private sources in Albania and Bulgaria, and from Zaire, South Africa, Republic of the Congo, Zambia, Togo, and Burkina Faso. In October 1997 the UN imposed travel sanctions on UNITA leaders, but the UN waited until July 1998 to limit UNITA's exportation of diamonds and freeze UNITA bank accounts. While the U.S. government gave US$250 million to UNITA between 1986 and 1991, UNITA made $1.72 billion between 1994 and 1999 exporting diamonds, primarily through Zaire to Europe. At the same time the Angolan government received large amounts of weapons from the governments of Belarus, Brazil, Bulgaria, the People's Republic of China, and South Africa. While no arms shipment to the government violated the protocol, no country informed the U.N. Register on Conventional Weapons as required.

In March 1995 UNITA militants shot and destroyed an UNAVEM III helicopter in Quibaxe. Military leaders met on 10 January 1995 and in February in Waku Kungo to make sure both sides continued to observe the ceasefire. Savimbi and dos Santos met four times after the helicopter downing; in Lusaka on 6 May in Gabon in August, in Brussels, Belgium in September, and in March 1996 in Libreville, Gabon. Between the first and second meetings dos Santos offered Savimbi the position of Vice President, but Savimbi turned him down in August 1996 during the party's Third Congress.

Executive Outcomes, a private military company, had 400–500 mercenaries in Angola fighting on behalf of the Angolan government until January 1996 in violation of the protocol's repatriation provision.

Savimbi and dos Santos spoke on the phone in December 1997 and reached an agreement on 9 January 1998 to implement the protocol, but fighting resumed and the peace process ended.

== See also ==
- Alvor Agreement
- Nakuru Agreement
