= United Nations Angola Verification Mission I =

UN peacekeeping mission during the Angolan Civil War

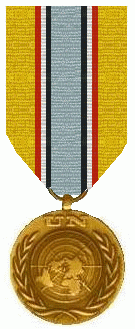
- Medal awarded to those who worked on I-UNAVEM
- Abbreviation: I-UNAVEM
- Successor: United Nations Angola Verification Mission II
- Established: January 1989
- Founder: United Nations
- Dissolved: June 1991
- Purpose: Peacekeeping
- Region served: Angola

The United Nations Angola Verification Mission I (I UNAVEM) was a peacekeeping mission that existed from January 1989 to June 1991 in Angola during the civil war. It was established by United Nations Security Council Resolution 626 on December 20, 1988.

In the civil war, the Soviet Union and Cuba backed the Movimento Popular de Libertação de Angola (MPLA), while South Africa and the United States backed the União Nacional para a Independência Total de Angola (UNITA). The MPLA became the stronger party.

UNAVEM I's purpose was oversee withdrawal of the Cuban troops. This mission was a success.

The United Nations created a follow-up mission, United Nations Angola Verification Mission II, in 1991.

== Awards ==
The UN issued awards for this mission: United Nations Medal (UNAVEM I - Angola)

== See also ==
- Cuban intervention in Angola
- O contexto das missões UNAVEM/MONUA, in: A participação da Hungria nas missões de paz da ONU em Angola
- Experiências dos operacionais húngaros em Angola depoimentos, in: A participação da Hungria nas missões de paz da ONU em Angola.
