= United Nations Security Council Resolution 696 =

UN Security Council Resolution 696
- Angola
- Date: 30 May 1991
- Meeting no.: 2,991
- Code: S/RES/696 (Document)
- Subject: Angola
- Voting summary: 15 voted for; None voted against; None abstained
- Result: Adopted

Security Council composition
- Permanent members: China; France; Soviet Union; United Kingdom; United States
- Non-permanent members: Austria; Belgium; Côte d'Ivoire; Cuba; Ecuador; India; Romania; Yemen; Zaire; Zimbabwe

United Nations Security Council resolution 696, adopted unanimously on 30 May 1991, after noting the recent desire to sign the Bicesse Accords between the MPLA and UNITA in Angola, the recent withdrawal of all Cuban troops and considering a report by the Secretary-General, the Council approved Javier Pérez de Cuéllar's recommendations and established the United Nations Angola Verification Mission II (UNAVEM II), noting that the mandate of the United Nations Angola Verification Mission I (1989–1991) was coming to an end.

The Council decided to establish UNAVEM II for an initial period of seventeen months to accomplish the objectives of the Secretary-General, which was to observe and verify the disarmament process and support the creation of a new single national army, observe demining, provide humanitarian aid and extend the government's authority over the whole country, affected by civil war.

Resolution 696 also requested the Secretary-General keep the Council up-to-date on developments and to report the signing of the Bicesse Accords.

== See also ==
- Angolan Civil War
- Cuban intervention in Angola
- List of United Nations Security Council Resolutions 601 to 700 (1987–1991)
- United Nations Angola Verification Mission III
