= United Nations Angola Verification Mission III =

Peacekeeping mission, 1995–1997

- Abbreviation: UNAVEM III
- Formation: February 1995
- Legal status: Mandate completed on 30 June 1997
- Headquarters: Luanda, Angola
- Head: Margaret Joan Anstee (February 1992 - June 1993); Alioune Blondin Beye (June 1993 - Conclusion)
- Parent organization: United Nations Security Council

The United Nations Angola Verification Mission III was the third peacekeeping mission operating in Angola from February 1995 until June 1997 during the Angolan Civil War. It was established by the United Nations Security Council in Resolution 976, after United Nations Angola Verification Mission II.

The Indian Army contributed to this mission by deploying one infantry battalion group (1000 personnel) and one engineers company group (200 personnel). There were a total of six infantry battalion groups operating in distinct regions of Angola, during this period: One each from India, Zimbabwe, Zambia, Brazil, Bangladesh, Uruguay and Romania.

The mandate of the various infantry battalion groups was to ensure ceasefire between the Angolan Army and the UNITA rebels who had control over more than half the country at that time, and then arrange for a safe "quartering" of these UNITA rebels once they laid down their arms. Subsequently, most of the arterial routes connecting major regions of the country were physically opened to traffic after de-mining them. The Indian Army initially sent 14 Punjab (Nabha Akal) as the infantry component and later replaced it with 16 Guards.

Upon its conclusion, the mission's total strength was 4,220 military personnel, comprising 283 military observers, 3,649 troops and 288 civilian police. Over the course of its two-year mission, UNAVEM III received 32 fatalities.

== Financing ==
Actual and pro forma expenditures from inception of mission through 31 December 1996 were $752,215,900 net. Budget estimate from 1 July 1996 through 30 June 1997 was $134,980,800 net. There was no budget estimate from 1 July 1997 through 30 June 1998 prepared in the expectation that the UN Security Council might authorize a follow-on mission as of 1 July 1997.

== Commanders and Personnel as of June 1997 (end of mission) ==
Commanders were Major-General Phillip Valerio Sibanda (Zimbabwe) October 1995 to 1997 and Major-General Chris Abutu Garuba (Nigeria) from February–September 1995.

- Bangladesh 205 troops; 10 military observers; 23 civilian police
- Brazil 739 troops; 20 military observers; 14 civilian police
- Bulgaria 10 military observers; 16 civilian police
- Congo 4 military observers
- Egypt 1 troop; 10 military observers; 14 civilian police
- France 15 troops; 7 military observers
- Guinea-Bissau 4 military observers; 4 civilian police
- Hungary 10 military observers; 7 civilian police
- India 452 troops; 20 military observers; 11 civilian police
- Jordan 2 troops; 17 military observers; 21 civilian police
- Kenya 10 military observers
- Malaysia 19 military observers; 20 civilian police
- Mali 9 military observers; 15 civilian police
- Namibia 199 troops
- Netherlands 2 troops; 14 military observers; 10 civilian police
- New Zealand 9 troops; 4 military observers
- Nigeria 19 military observers; 21 civilian police
- Norway 4 military observers
- Pakistan 14 military observers
- Poland 7 civilian police
- Portugal 313 troops; 6 military observers; 39 civilian police
- Romania 327 troops
- Russian Federation 151 troops; 7 civilian police
- Senegal 10 military observers
- Slovak Republic 5 military observers
- Sweden 19 military observers; 18 civilian police
- Tanzania 3 civilian police
- Ukraine 4 troops; 5 military observers
- Uruguay 7 troops; 3 military observers; 15 civilian police
- Zambia 509 troops; 10 military observers; 15 civilian police
- Zambia 700 troops; 20 military observers; 22 civilian police

== See also ==
- UNAVEM I
- UNAVEM II
