= United Nations Angola Verification Mission II =

Second UN peacekeeping mission in Angola (1991–1995)

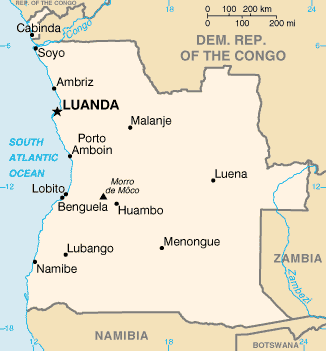
Map of Angola

The United Nations Angola Verification Mission II (UNAVEM II), established May 1991 and lasting until February 1995, was the second United Nations peacekeeping mission, of a total of four, deployed to Angola during the course of the Angolan Civil War, the longest war in modern African history. Specifically, the mission was established to oversee and maintain the multilateral ceasefire of 1990 and the subsequent Bicesse Accords in 1991, which instituted an electoral process for the first time including the two rival factions of the civil war, the People's Movement for the Liberation of Angola (MPLA), the de facto government of Angola, with control of Luanda and most of the country since independence in 1975, and the National Union for the Total Independence of Angola (UNITA).

The mission's original mandate was established by United Nations Security Council Resolution 696 (1991), passed on May 30, 1991. The stated mandate was:

to verify the arrangements agreed by the Angolan parties for the monitoring of the ceasefire and for the monitoring of the Angolan police during the ceasefire period.

The subsequent resolution Resolution 747 (1992), passed March 24, 1992 altered the mandate to include electoral monitoring duties. During the country's newly agreed upon election, 400 UN electoral observers were deployed, along with the rest of the mission, with the added mandate of "observation and verification of the presidential and legislative elections in Angola." After a series of Security Council resolutions in 1993, the mandate was again altered to encourage more stringent adherence to the ceasefire by both the government of Angola and UNITA, after a resumption of hostilities. Finally, in late 1994, with Security Council Resolutions 952 (1994) and 966 (1994), UNAVEM II began observation and verification of the Lusaka Protocol of November 20, 1994. Preparations were begun to make way for the new mission, United Nations Angola Verification Mission III (UNAVEM III), set up in the wake of the Lusaka Protocol.

The mission consisted of military observers, civilian police, electoral observers, paramedics and both local and international staff. The personnel came from 25 countries in five continents. There was a maximum deployment of over 1100 during the early polling, as well as a minimum strength of under 200 after June 1993. UNAVEM II suffered a total of 5 fatalities, 3 military and 2 civilian.

== Background ==
Soon after Angola's independence from Portugal in 1975, the tenuous three-way coalition government descended into civil war. The MLPA, with the support of Cuban troops as well as backing by the Soviet Union and other communist parties, quickly gained control of Luanda and the government, and the UNITA, allied with the tribal National Liberation Front of Angola (FNLA) was restricted to the country's interior. The first UN peacekeeping mission to Angola, United Nations Angola Verification Mission I (UNAVEM I) oversaw the agreed upon Cuban withdrawal in 1988. That same year, the South African troops supporting UNITA were withdrawn and by 1990 the belligerents, joined by eighteen other African nations agreed to a ceasefire. In mid-1991, the UN Security Council authorized the deployment of UNAVEM II to succeed UNAVEM I and monitor the new ceasefire agreement. The 1991 Bicesse Accords established a democratic electoral system for Angola, under the supervision of UNAVEM II. After the 1992 call to arms by disgruntled UNITA presidential candidate Jonas Savimbi, hostilities resumed until 1994's Lusaka Protocol.

== Awards ==
The UN Issued awards for this mission: United Nations Medal (UNAVEM II - Angola)

== See also ==
- Angolan War of Independence
- Angolan Civil War
- List of UN peacekeeping missions
- Apurba Kumar Bardalai
