= United Nations Security Council Resolution 1573 =

United Nations Security Council resolution

UN Security Council Resolution 1573
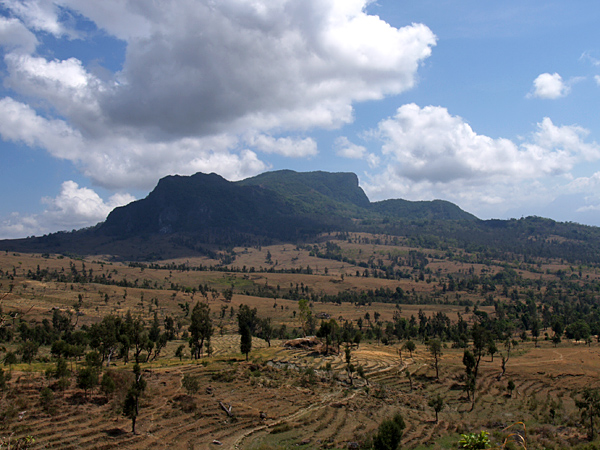
- Mountains in East Timor
- Date: 16 November 2004
- Meeting no.: 5,079
- Code: S/RES/1573 (Document)
- Subject: The situation in East Timor
- Voting summary: 15 voted for; None voted against; None abstained
- Result: Adopted

Security Council composition
- Permanent members: China; France; Russia; United Kingdom; United States
- Non-permanent members: Algeria; Angola; Benin; Brazil; Chile; Germany; Pakistan; Philippines; Romania; Spain

United Nations Security Council resolution 1573, adopted unanimously on 16 November 2004, after reaffirming previous resolutions on East Timor (Timor-Leste), particularly resolutions 1410 (2002), 1473 (2003), 1480 (2003) and 1543 (2004), the Council extended the mandate of the United Nations Mission of Support to East Timor (UNMISET) for a final six months until 20 May 2005.

== Resolution ==
=== Observations ===
The Security Council praised the efforts of the East Timorese government and people in developing institutions for an independent state including infrastructure, public administration, law enforcement and defence capabilities, though it noted it had not yet achieved self-sufficiency in some of these areas. The work of UNMISET and the progress it had made was also praised in this regard. Furthermore, the Council welcomed good relations between East Timor and neighbouring countries.

=== Acts ===
The mandate of UNMISET was extended for a final period of six months at its existing size and composition as described in Resolution 1543. UNMISET was asked to focus on its exit strategy in order to return responsibility to the Timorese authorities. Meanwhile, the donor community was called upon to continue providing assistance to East Timor and for United Nations agencies to help in the transition from a peacekeeping mission to a sustainable development framework.

The resolution also reaffirmed the need to combat impunity and the Secretary-General Kofi Annan was asked to closely monitor the situation.

== See also ==
- 1999 East Timorese crisis
- East Timor Special Autonomy Referendum
- Indonesian occupation of East Timor
- List of United Nations Security Council Resolutions 1501 to 1600 (2003–2005)
- United Nations Transitional Administration in East Timor
