= United Nations Security Council Resolution 1489 =

UN Security Council Resolution 1489
- North Kivu in eastern Democratic Republic of the Congo
- Date: 26 June 2003
- Meeting no.: 4,780
- Code: S/RES/1489 (Document)
- Subject: The situation concerning the Democratic Republic of the Congo
- Voting summary: 15 voted for; None voted against; None abstained
- Result: Adopted

Security Council composition
- Permanent members: China; France; Russia; United Kingdom; United States
- Non-permanent members: Angola; Bulgaria; Chile; Cameroon; Germany; Guinea; Mexico; Pakistan; Spain; Syria

United Nations Security Council resolution 1489, adopted unanimously on 26 June 2003, after recalling Resolution 1291 (2000) and other resolutions on the situation in the Democratic Republic of the Congo, particularly resolutions 1468 (2003) and 1484 (2003), the Council extended the mandate of the United Nations Mission in the Democratic Republic of Congo (MONUC) until 30 July 2003.

The Council reaffirmed its commitment to the sovereignty, territorial integrity and independence of the Democratic Republic of the Congo. There was concern over hostilities in the east of the country, particularly in North Kivu province. The Security Council had authorised Operation Artemis in Ituri province the previous month due to fighting in that region.

Supporting the peace process, the resolution extended MONUC's mandate for a period of one month, while it considered an extension until 30 June 2004 as recommended by the Secretary-General Kofi Annan, and an increase in MONUC personnel from 8,700 to 10,800.

== See also ==
- Kivu conflict
- Ituri conflict
- List of United Nations Security Council Resolutions 1401 to 1500 (2002–2003)
- Lusaka Ceasefire Agreement
- Operation Artemis
- Second Congo War
