= United Nations Security Council Resolution 1543 =

UN Security Council Resolution 1543
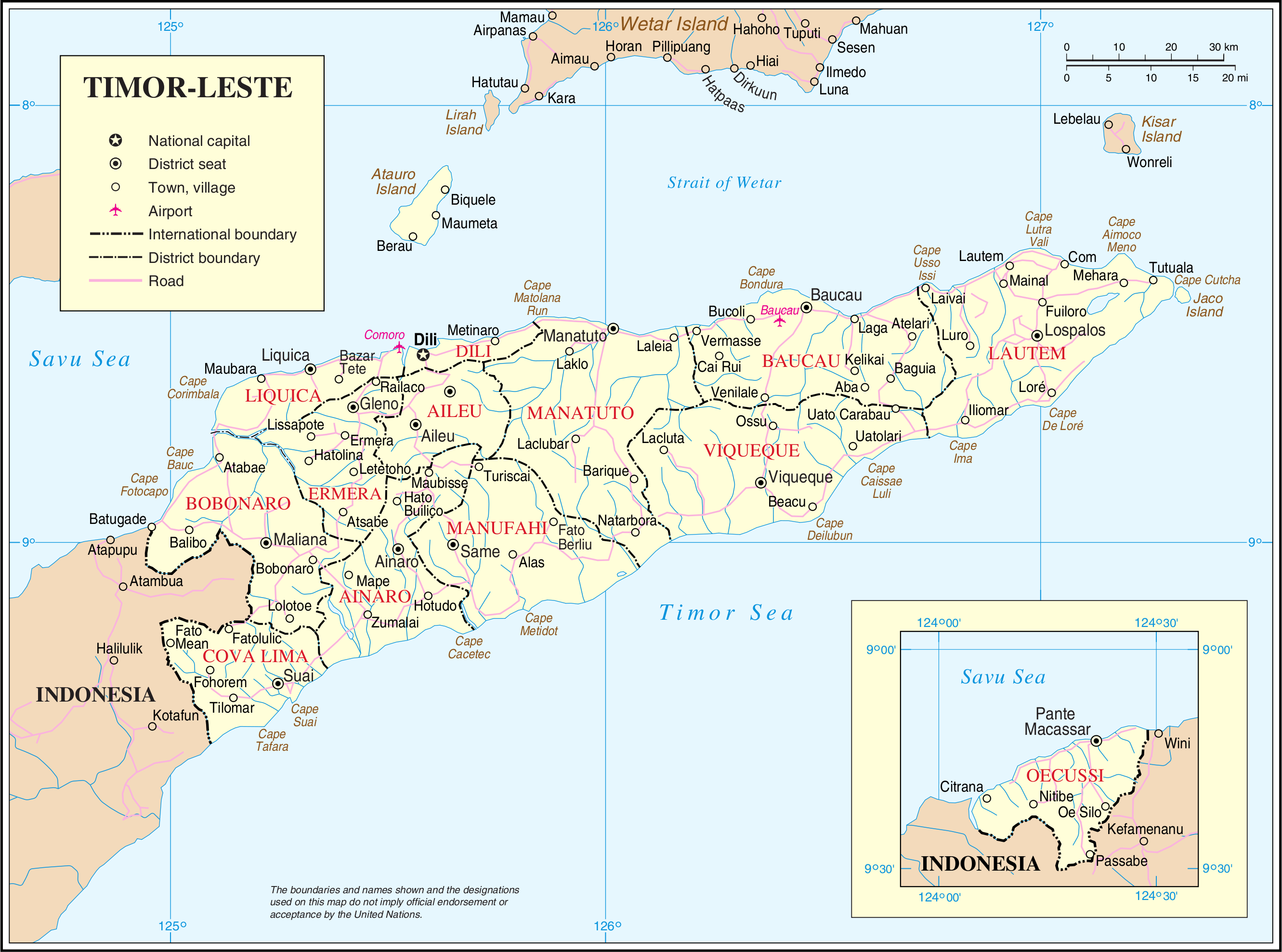
- East Timor
- Date: 14 May 2004
- Meeting no.: 4,968
- Code: S/RES/1543 (Document)
- Subject: The situation in East Timor
- Voting summary: 15 voted for; None voted against; None abstained
- Result: Adopted

Security Council composition
- Permanent members: China; France; Russia; United Kingdom; United States
- Non-permanent members: Algeria; Angola; Benin; Brazil; Chile; Germany; Pakistan; Philippines; Romania; Spain

United Nations Security Council resolution 1543 was adopted unanimously on 14 May 2004, after reaffirming previous resolutions on East Timor (Timor-Leste), particularly resolutions 1410 (2002), 1473 (2003) and 1480 (2003). The Council extended the mandate of the United Nations Mission of Support to East Timor (UNMISET) for six months, with a view to extending it for a further final period of six months until 20 May 2005.

== Resolution ==
=== Observations ===
The Security Council praised the efforts of the East Timorese government and people in developing institutions for an independent state including infrastructure, public administration, law enforcement and defence capabilities. The work of UNMISET and the progress it had made was also praised in this regard. Furthermore, East Timor had requested a one-year extension of UNMISET, which was also echoed by the Secretary-General Kofi Annan in order for remaining tasks to be performed.

The preamble of the resolution also noted that emerging institutions were still in the process of consolidation and that further assistance was required to strengthen the justice and public administration sectors, including the National Police. It also welcomed the good nature of the diplomatic relations between East Timor and Indonesia.

=== Acts ===
The mandate of UNMISET was extended for six months, with a view to extending it for a further and final six months until 20 May 2005. Its size was also reduced to include a to 58 civilian advisers, 157 police advisers, 42 military liaison officers, 310 troops and a 125-person International Response Unit. At the same time, its tasks were revised to support public administration, law enforcement and the justice system, and the security and stability of the country. The tasks would consist of an integral human rights part in training and capacity-building carried out by the operation.

Meanwhile, the Secretary-General was asked to report on progress on the ground, including the size, tasks and composition of UNMISET, and the tasks and configuration of police and military components of UNMISET. All investigations by the crime unit had to be completed by November 2004 and trials ended by 20 May 2005. Finally, contributions from donors were urged to support the long-term development of East Timor.

== See also ==
- 1999 East Timorese crisis
- East Timor Special Autonomy Referendum
- Indonesian occupation of East Timor
- List of United Nations Security Council Resolutions 1501 to 1600 (2003–2005)
- United Nations Transitional Administration in East Timor
