= United Nations Security Council Resolution 1474 =

UN Security Council Resolution 1474
- Somalia in the Horn of Africa
- Date: 8 April 2003
- Meeting no.: 4,737
- Code: S/RES/1474 (Document)
- Subject: The situation in Somalia
- Voting summary: 15 voted for; None voted against; None abstained
- Result: Adopted

Security Council composition
- Permanent members: China; France; Russia; United Kingdom; United States
- Non-permanent members: Angola; Bulgaria; Chile; Cameroon; Germany; Guinea; Mexico; Pakistan; Spain; Syria

United Nations Security Council resolution 1474, adopted unanimously on 8 April 2003, after recalling resolutions on the situation in Somalia, particularly resolutions 733 (1992), 1407 (2002) and 1425 (2002), the council re-established a panel of experts to investigate violations of the arms embargo against the country.

== Resolution ==
=== Observations ===
The Security Council expressed concern at continuous violations of the Somalia arms embargo since 1992 and related illegal activities. It reiterated its support for the reconciliation process in the country, including the recent Reconciliation Conference, and insisted that all states, particularly those in the region, should refrain from interfering in the internal affairs of Somalia as such interference would destabilise the country. Furthermore, there was concern at the continued flow of weapons and ammunition to and through Somalia from outside sources and therefore it was important to continue monitoring and improving the implementation of the arms embargo.

=== Acts ===
Acting under Chapter VII of the United Nations Charter, the council stressed complicity of all states with the arms embargo and that any non-compliance constituted a violation of the United Nations Charter. It decided to re-establish a panel of four experts appointed by the Secretary-General and based in Nairobi for six months to investigate violations of the arms embargo by land, air and sea; detail information related to the violations and to enforcement of the embargo; carry out field research in Somalia and other countries; assess the capacity of states in the region to fully implement the arms embargo, including by review of national customs and border control; explore co-operation with the African Union; and to recommend steps to strengthen its enforcement. Furthermore, the panel was required to have access to expertise in areas of civil aviation, maritime transport, regional affairs and knowledge of the country and report to the committee established in Resolution 751 (1992).

The resolution requested the full co-operation of neighbouring states, the Transitional National Government (TNG) in Somalia and other entities or individuals by providing unhindered access to information for the expert panel and for states to provide information on violations of the arms embargo; instances of non-compliance were to be reported to the council. A mission of the committee would be sent to the region to demonstrate the determination to give effect to the arms embargo, while all neighbouring states were asked to report quarterly. Regional organisations, the African Union and League of Arab States were called upon to assist the Somali parties in the implementation of the embargo.

== See also ==
- Disarmament in Somalia
- List of United Nations Security Council Resolutions 1401 to 1500 (2002–2003)
- Somali Civil War
