= United Nations Security Council Resolution 1485 =

UN Security Council Resolution 1485
- Western Sahara in West Africa
- Date: 30 May 2003
- Meeting no.: 4,765
- Code: S/RES/1485 (Document)
- Subject: The situation concerning Western Sahara
- Voting summary: 15 voted for; None voted against; None abstained
- Result: Adopted

Security Council composition
- Permanent members: China; France; Russia; United Kingdom; United States
- Non-permanent members: Angola; Bulgaria; Chile; Cameroon; Germany; Guinea; Mexico; Pakistan; Spain; Syria

United Nations Security Council resolution 1485, adopted unanimously on 30 May 2003, after recalling all previous resolutions on the situation in Western Sahara, particularly Resolution 1429 (2002), the Council extended the mandate of the United Nations Mission for the Referendum in Western Sahara (MINURSO) for two months until 31 July 2003.

The Security Council extended the MINURSO operation to allow Morocco and the Polisario Front further time to consider proposals presented by the Secretary-General's Personal Envoy James Baker III for a political solution to the dispute and provide their views on the Baker Plan. The proposal provided for the self-determination of the people of Western Sahara. In addition, the Special Representative of the Secretary-General was commended for his efforts to resolve humanitarian issues and in the implementation of confidence-building measures proposed by the United Nations High Commissioner for Refugees.

== See also ==
- Free Zone (region)
- Political status of Western Sahara
- List of United Nations Security Council Resolutions 1401 to 1500 (2002–2003)
- Sahrawi Arab Democratic Republic
- Moroccan Western Sahara Wall
