= List of United Nations Security Council Resolutions 1401 to 1500 =

This is a list of United Nations Security Council Resolutions 1401 to 1500 adopted between 28 March 2002 and 14 August 2003.

Resolution	Date	Vote	Concerns
1401	28 March 2002	15–0–0	Establishes the United Nations Assistance Mission in Afghanistan
1402	30 March 2002	14–0–0 (Syria did not participate)	Calls for a ceasefire between Israel and the Palestinians during Operation Defensive Shield
1403	4 April 2002	15–0–0	Demands implementation of Resolution 1402
1404	18 April 2002	15–0–0	Extends mechanism monitoring sanctions against UNITA in Angola
1405	19 April 2002	15–0–0	Urges access to Palestinian civilian population by humanitarian organisations
1406	30 April 2002	15–0–0	Extends mandate of the United Nations Mission for the Referendum in Western Sahara
1407	3 May 2002	15–0–0	Establishes expert panel to investigate violations of arms embargo against Somalia
1408	6 May 2002	15–0–0	Extends sanctions against Liberia
1409	14 May 2002	15–0–0	Adopts revised sanctions against Iraq; extends Oil-for-Food Programme
1410	17 May 2002	15–0–0	Establishes the United Nations Mission of Support to East Timor
1411	17 May 2002	15–0–0	Judges holding dual nationality at the International Criminal Tribunals for Rwanda and former Yugoslavia
1412	17 May 2002	15–0–0	Suspends travel restrictions on UNITA officials in Angola
1413	23 May 2002	15–0–0	Extends authorisation of International Security Assistance Force in Afghanistan
1414	23 May 2002	Adopted without vote	Admission of East Timor to the United Nations
1415	30 May 2002	15–0–0	Extends mandate of the United Nations Disengagement Observer Force
1416	13 June 2002	15–0–0	Extends mandate of the United Nations Peacekeeping Force in Cyprus
1417	14 June 2002	15–0–0	Extends mandate of the United Nations Mission in the Democratic Republic of Congo
1418	21 June 2002	15–0–0	Extends mandate of the United Nations Mission in Bosnia and Herzegovina
1419	26 June 2002	15–0–0	Calls for co-operation with the Afghan Transitional Administration
1420	30 June 2002	15–0–0	Extends mandate of the United Nations Mission in Bosnia and Herzegovina
1421	3 July 2002	15–0–0	Extends mandate of the United Nations Mission in Bosnia and Herzegovina
1422	12 July 2002	15–0–0	Grants United Nations peacekeeping personnel immunity from prosecution
1423	12 July 2002	15–0–0	Extends mandate of the United Nations Mission in Bosnia and Herzegovina
1424	12 July 2002	15–0–0	Extends mandate of the United Nations Mission of Observers in Prevlaka
1425	22 July 2002	15–0–0	Establishes expert panel to strengthen and fully implement arms embargo against Somalia
1426	24 July 2002	Adopted without vote	Admission of Switzerland to the United Nations
1427	29 July 2002	15–0–0	Extends mandate of the United Nations Observer Mission in Georgia
1428	30 July 2002	15–0–0	Extends mandate of the United Nations Interim Force in Lebanon
1429	30 July 2002	15–0–0	Extends mandate of the United Nations Mission for the Referendum in Western Sahara
1430	14 August 2002	15–0–0	Adjusts mandate of the United Nations Mission in Ethiopia and Eritrea
1431	14 August 2002	15–0–0	Establishes pool of ad litem judges of the International Criminal Tribunal for Rwanda
1432	15 August 2002	15–0–0	Extends suspension of travel sanctions against UNITA in Angola
1433	15 August 2002	15–0–0	Establishes the United Nations Mission in Angola
1434	6 September 2002	15–0–0	Extends mandate of the United Nations Mission in Ethiopia and Eritrea
1435	24 September 2002	14–0–1 (abstention: United States)	Demands end to Israeli measures in Ramallah and withdrawal of troops
1436	24 September 2002	15–0–0	Extends mandate of the United Nations Mission in Sierra Leone
1437	11 October 2002	15–0–0	Extends mandate of the United Nations Mission of Observers in Prevlaka for final time
1438	14 October 2002	15–0–0	Condemns bombings in Bali, Indonesia
1439	18 October 2002	15–0–0	Extends monitoring mechanism of sanctions against UNITA in Angola; lifts travel ban
1440	24 October 2002	15–0–0	Condemns Moscow theatre hostage siege
1441	8 November 2002	15–0–0	Gives Iraq last chance to disarm
1442	25 November 2002	15–0–0	Extends mandate of the United Nations Peacekeeping Force in Cyprus
1443	25 November 2002	15–0–0	Extends Iraqi Oil-for-Food Programme
1444	27 November 2002	15–0–0	Extends authorisation of International Security Assistance Force in Afghanistan
1445	4 December 2002	15–0–0	Expands the United Nations Mission in the Democratic Republic of the Congo
1446	4 December 2002	15–0–0	Extends sanctions against import of illicit diamonds from Sierra Leone
1447	4 December 2002	15–0–0	Extends Iraqi Oil-for-Food Programme
1448	9 December 2002	15–0–0	Terminates sanctions against UNITA in Angola
1449	13 December 2002	15–0–0	Nominations for judges at the International Criminal Tribunal for Rwanda
1450	13 December 2002	14–1–0 (against: Syria)	Condemns attacks against Israeli targets in Mombasa, Kenya
1451	17 December 2002	15–0–0	Extends mandate of the United Nations Disengagement Observer Force
1452	20 December 2002	15–0–0	Adjusts provisions of sanctions against the Taliban and Al-Qaeda
1453	24 December 2002	15–0–0	Endorses Kabul Declaration on Good Neighborly Relations in Afghanistan
1454	30 December 2002	13–0–2 (abstentions: Russia, Syria)	Adjusts list of restricted goods and procedures of Iraqi Oil-for-Food Programme
1455	17 January 2003	15–0–0	Improves implementation of measures against the Taliban and Al-Qaeda
1456	20 January 2003	15–0–0	Calls for urgent action to suppress and prevent support for terrorism
1457	24 January 2003	15–0–0	Condemns illegal exploitation of natural resources in the Democratic Republic of Congo; panel of investigation
1458	28 January 2003	15–0–0	Re-establishes panel monitoring compliance with sanctions against Liberia
1459	28 January 2003	15–0–0	Expresses support for the Kimberley Process Certification Scheme
1460	30 January 2003	15–0–0	Children in armed conflict
1461	30 January 2003	15–0–0	Extends mandate of the United Nations Interim Force in Lebanon
1462	30 January 2003	15–0–0	Extends mandate of the United Nations Observer Mission in Georgia
1463	30 January 2003	15–0–0	Extends mandate of the United Nations Mission for the Referendum in Western Sahara
1464	4 February 2003	15–0–0	Calls for implementation of peace agreement in Côte d’Ivoire during the civil war
1465	13 February 2003	15–0–0	Condemns bombing in Bogotá, Colombia
1466	14 March 2003	15–0–0	Extends mandate of the United Nations Mission in Ethiopia and Eritrea
1467	18 March 2003	15–0–0	Calls for strengthening co-operation against arms trafficking and mercenaries in West Africa
1468	20 March 2003	15–0–0	Welcomes agreement for establishing transitional government in the Democratic Republic of Congo
1469	25 March 2003	15–0–0	Extends mandate of the United Nations Mission for the Referendum in Western Sahara
1470	28 March 2003	15–0–0	Extends mandate of the United Nations Mission in Sierra Leone
1471	28 March 2003	15–0–0	Extends mandate of the United Nations Assistance Mission in Afghanistan
1472	28 March 2003	15–0–0	Adjustments to the Iraqi Oil-for-Food Programme
1473	4 April 2003	15–0–0	Downsizes police and military components of the United Nations Mission of Support to East Timor
1474	8 April 2003	15–0–0	Re-establishes panel to investigate violations of arms embargo against Somalia
1475	14 April 2003	15–0–0	Regrets failure to reach settlement of the Cyprus dispute
1476	24 April 2003	15–0–0	Extends Iraq Oil-for-Food Programme
1477	29 April 2003	15–0–0	Nominations for ad litem judges at the International Criminal Tribunal for Rwanda
1478	6 May 2003	15–0–0	Extends sanctions against Liberia; ban on Liberian timber imports
1479	13 May 2003	15–0–0	Establishes the United Nations Mission in Côte d'Ivoire
1480	19 May 2003	15–0–0	Extends mandate of the United Nations Mission of Support to East Timor
1481	19 May 2003	15–0–0	Gives more powers to temporary judges at the International Criminal Tribunal for the former Yugoslavia
1482	19 May 2003	15–0–0	Extends terms of judges at the International Criminal Tribunal for Rwanda
1483	22 May 2003	14–0–0 (Syria did not participate)	Lifts sanctions against Iraq; extends Oil-for-Food Programme
1484	30 May 2003	15–0–0	Authorises Operation Artemis in Bunia, Democratic Republic of Congo
1485	30 May 2003	15–0–0	Extends mandate of the United Nations Mission for the Referendum in Western Sahara
1486	11 June 2003	15–0–0	Extends mandate of the United Nations Peacekeeping Force in Cyprus
1487	12 June 2003	12–0–3 (abstentions: France, Germany, Syria)	Exempts United Nations peacekeepers from the International Criminal Court
1488	26 June 2003	15–0–0	Extends mandate of the United Nations Disengagement Observer Force
1489	26 June 2003	15–0–0	Extends mandate of the United Nations Mission in the Democratic Republic of Congo
1490	3 July 2003	15–0–0	Extends mandate of the United Nations Iraq–Kuwait Observation Mission
1491	11 July 2003	15–0–0	Extends mandate of the Stabilisation Force in Bosnia and Herzegovina
1492	18 July 2003	15–0–0	Drawdown of the United Nations Mission in Sierra Leone
1493	28 July 2003	15–0–0	Extends mandate of the United Nations Mission in the Democratic Republic of Congo
1494	30 July 2003	15–0–0	Extends mandate of the United Nations Observer Mission in Georgia
1495	31 July 2003	15–0–0	Extends mandate of the United Nations Mission for the Referendum in Western Sahara
1496	31 July 2003	15–0–0	Extends mandate of the United Nations Interim Force in Lebanon
1497	1 August 2003	12–0–3 (abstentions: France, Germany, Mexico)	Establishes multinational force in Liberia during the Second Liberian Civil War
1498	4 August 2003	15–0–0	Renews authorisation for French and West African forces operating in Côte d’Ivoire
1499	13 August 2003	15–0–0	Extends expert panel monitoring exploitation of natural resources in the Democratic Republic of the Congo
1500	14 August 2003	14–0–1 (abstention: Syria)	Establishes the United Nations Assistance Mission in Iraq

== See also ==
- Lists of United Nations Security Council resolutions
- List of United Nations Security Council Resolutions 1301 to 1400
- List of United Nations Security Council Resolutions 1501 to 1600
