= United Nations Security Council Resolution 1476 =

UN Security Council Resolution 1476
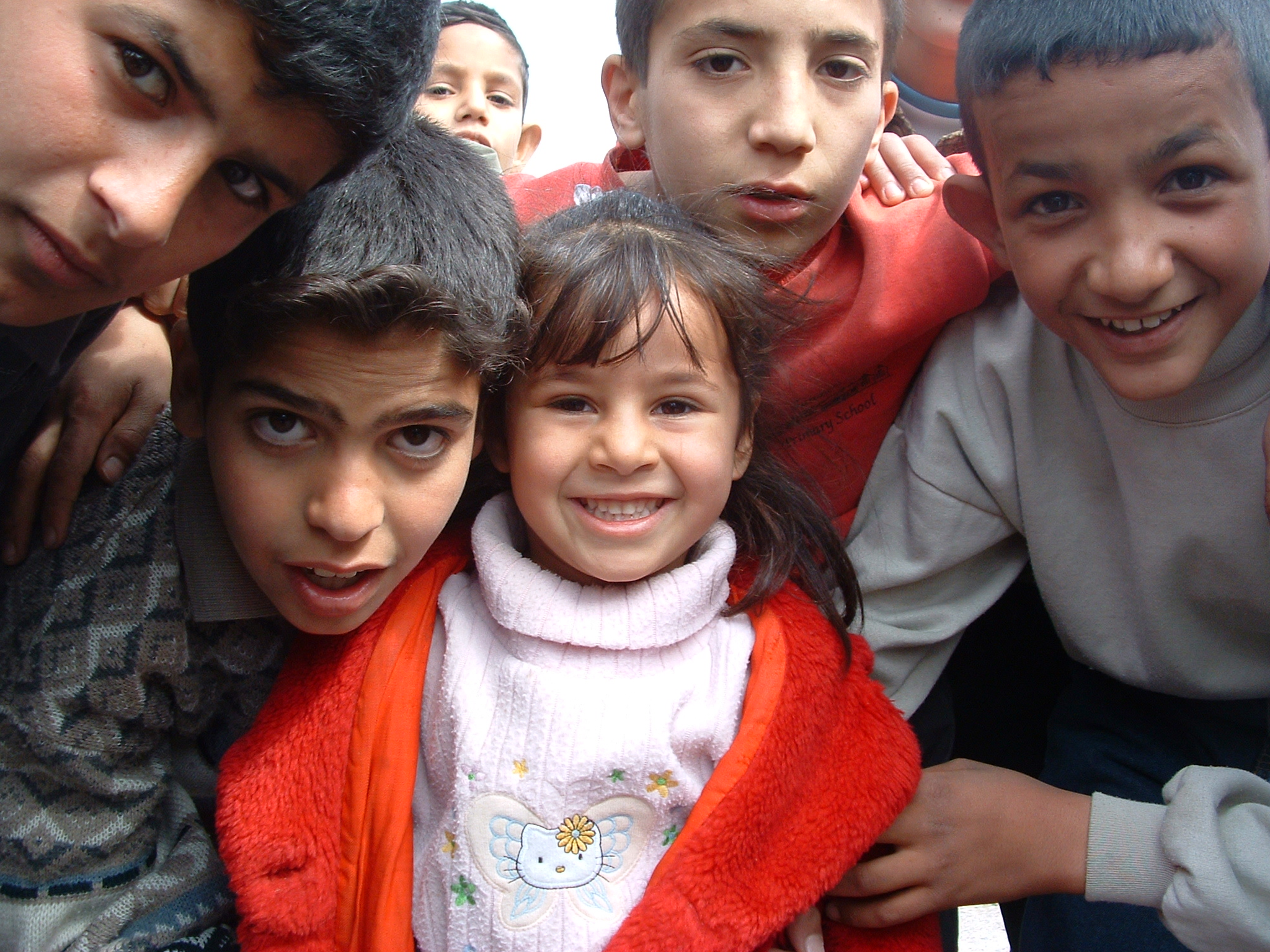
- Children living next to an oil refinery in Iraq
- Date: 24 April 2003
- Meeting no.: 4,743
- Code: S/RES/1476 (Document)
- Subject: The situation between Iraq and Kuwait
- Voting summary: 15 voted for; None voted against; None abstained
- Result: Adopted

Security Council composition
- Permanent members: China; France; Russia; United Kingdom; United States
- Non-permanent members: Angola; Bulgaria; Chile; Cameroon; Germany; Guinea; Mexico; Pakistan; Spain; Syria

United Nations Security Council resolution 1476, adopted unanimously on 24 April 2003, after recalling all previous resolutions on Iraq, including resolutions 661 (1991), 986 (1995), 1409 (2002), 1454 (2002) and 1472 (2003) concerning the provision of humanitarian aid to the Iraqi people, the council extended the Oil-for-Food Programme until 3 June 2003.

The extension was enacted under Chapter VII of the United Nations Charter and was subject to further renewals by the council. The previous resolution concerning this topic gave the Secretary-General of the United Nations more authority to administer the Programme. By the time of the adoption of Resolution 1476, the value of shippable priority items to Iraq reached US$548.6 million.

== See also ==
- Gulf War
- Invasion of Kuwait
- Sanctions against Iraq
- Iraq War
- List of United Nations Security Council Resolutions 1401 to 1500 (2002–2003)
