= United Nations Security Council Resolution 1406 =

UN Security Council Resolution 1406
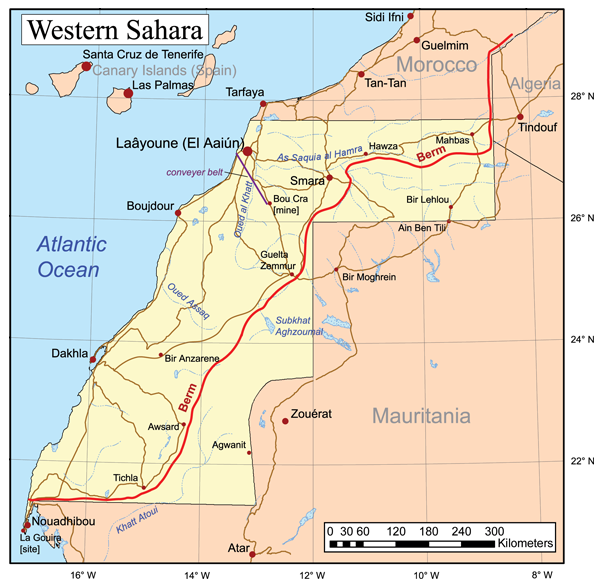
- Western Sahara
- Date: 30 April 2002
- Meeting no.: 4,523
- Code: S/RES/1406 (Document)
- Subject: The situation concerning Western Sahara
- Voting summary: 15 voted for; None voted against; None abstained
- Result: Adopted

Security Council composition
- Permanent members: China; France; Russia; United Kingdom; United States
- Non-permanent members: Bulgaria; Cameroon; Colombia; Guinea; Ireland; Mauritius; Mexico; Norway; Singapore; Syria

United Nations Security Council resolution 1406, adopted unanimously on 30 April 2002, after recalling all previous resolutions on the situation on Western Sahara, particularly Resolution 1394 (2002), the council extended the mandate of the United Nations Mission for the Referendum in Western Sahara (MINURSO) until 31 July 2002.

MINURSO's mandate was extended to allow for more time for the council to consider the Secretary-General Kofi Annan's 'four options' concerning the future of Western Sahara, described in his report. The four options were:

1. The resumption of the implementation of the Settlement Plan without requiring agreements from both Morocco and the Polisario Front. Under this option, the MINURSO Identification Commission for voters would be reinforced and overall MINURSO operation size increased;
2. The Secretary-General's Personal Envoy James A. Baker III would revise the framework agreement which would be presented to the parties on a non-negotiable basis. This would involve a devolution of authority to the population of Western Sahara with a referendum taking place on self-determination and the size of MINURSO would be reduced;
3. The Secretary-General's Personal Envoy James A. Baker III would determine if the parties would discuss a division of Western Sahara territory. Baker would present his proposal for a division of the territory and MINURSO would be maintained at its current size;
4. The termination of the MINURSO operation which would be an acknowledgement that the United Nations was unable to solve the dispute unless one or both parties were required to do something they would not voluntarily agree to.

The Moroccan government rejected all the proposals except the second, while the Polisario Front argued that the Settlement Plan was the only acceptable solution.

== See also ==
- Baker Plan
- Free Zone (region)
- Legal status of Western Sahara
- List of United Nations Security Council Resolutions 1401 to 1500 (2002–2003)
- Sahrawi Arab Democratic Republic
- Wall (Western Sahara)
