= United Nations Security Council Resolution 1469 =

UN Security Council Resolution 1469
- Date: 25 March 2003
- Meeting no.: 4,725
- Code: S/RES/1469 (Document)
- Subject: The situation concerning Western Sahara
- Voting summary: 15 voted for; None voted against; None abstained
- Result: Adopted

Security Council composition
- Permanent members: China; France; Russia; United Kingdom; United States
- Non-permanent members: Angola; Bulgaria; Chile; Cameroon; Germany; Guinea; Mexico; Pakistan; Spain; Syria

United Nations Security Council resolution 1469, adopted unanimously on 25 March 2003, after recalling all previous resolutions on the situation in Western Sahara, particularly Resolution 1429 (2002), the Council extended the mandate of the United Nations Mission for the Referendum in Western Sahara (MINURSO) for two months until 31 May 2003.

The Security Council extended the MINURSO operation to allow Morocco and the Polisario Front further time to consider proposals presented by the Secretary-General's Personal Envoy James Baker III for a political solution to the dispute and provide their views. The proposal provided for the self-determination of the people of Western Sahara. In addition, the Secretary-General Kofi Annan was asked to submit a report by 19 May 2003 on the situation.

== See also ==
- Free Zone (region)
- Political status of Western Sahara
- List of United Nations Security Council Resolutions 1401 to 1500 (2002–2003)
- Sahrawi Arab Democratic Republic
- Moroccan Western Sahara Wall
