= United Nations Security Council Resolution 1451 =

UN Security Council Resolution 1451
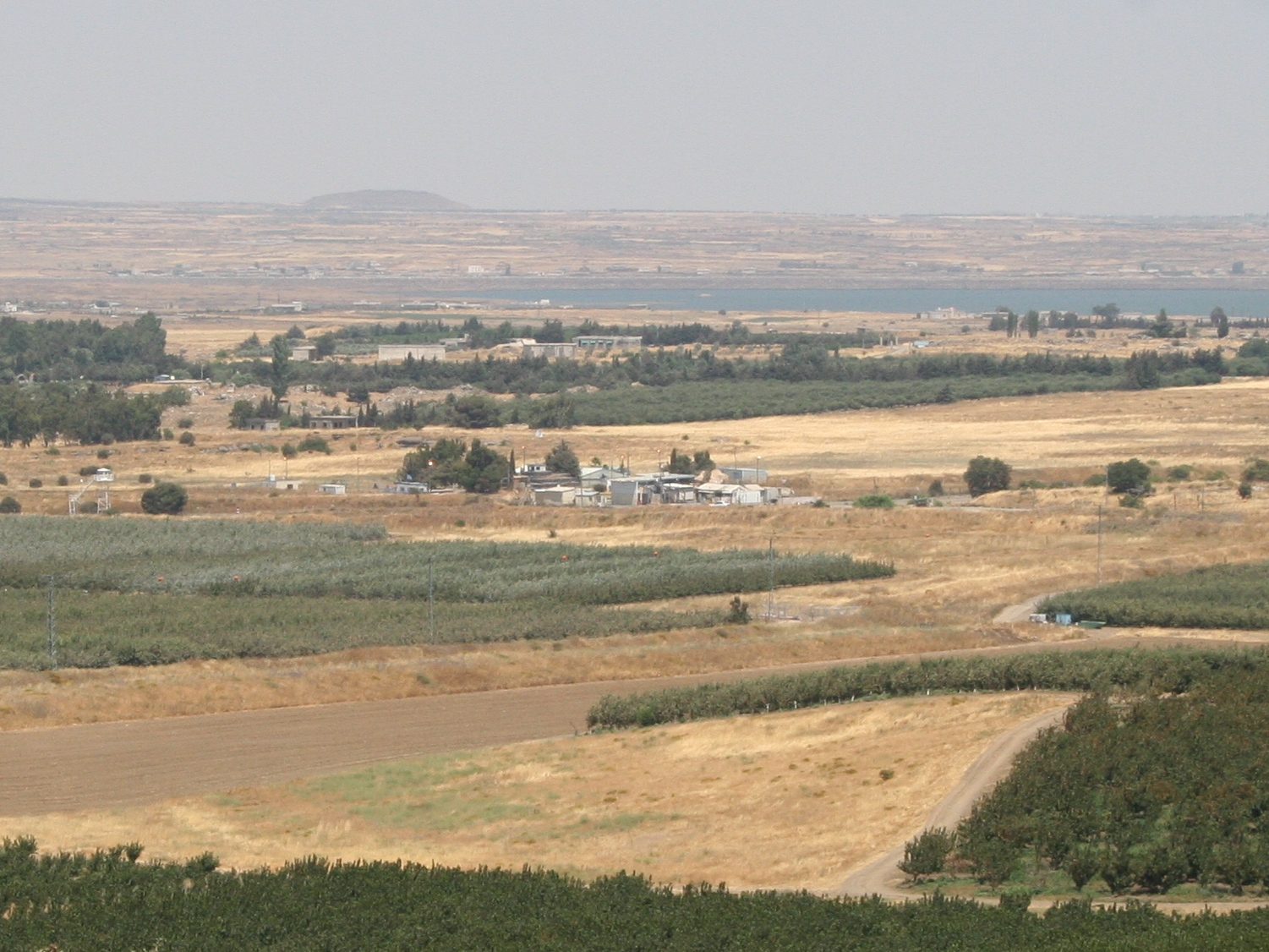
- Border crossing between Israel and Syria
- Date: 17 December 2002
- Meeting no.: 4,670
- Code: S/RES/1451 (Document)
- Subject: The situation in the Middle East
- Voting summary: 15 voted for; None voted against; None abstained
- Result: Adopted

Security Council composition
- Permanent members: China; France; Russia; United Kingdom; United States
- Non-permanent members: Bulgaria; Cameroon; Colombia; Guinea; Ireland; Mauritius; Mexico; Norway; Singapore; Syria

United Nations Security Council resolution 1451, adopted unanimously on 17 December 2002, after considering a report by the Secretary-General Kofi Annan regarding the United Nations Disengagement Observer Force (UNDOF), the Council extended its mandate for a further six months until 30 June 2003.

The resolution called upon the parties concerned to immediately implement Resolution 338 (1973) and requested that the Secretary-General submit a report on the situation at the end of that period.

The Secretary-General's report pursuant to the previous resolution on UNDOF said that the situation between Israel and Syria had remained calm with no serious incidents though the situation in the Middle East as a whole remained dangerous until a settlement could be reached. Furthermore, it recognised the threat of land mines to UNDOF and the tense situation in the Shebaa farms area.

== See also ==
- Arab–Israeli conflict
- Golan Heights
- Israel–Syria relations
- List of United Nations Security Council Resolutions 1401 to 1500 (2002–2003)
