= United Nations Security Council Resolution 1470 =

UN Security Council Resolution 1470
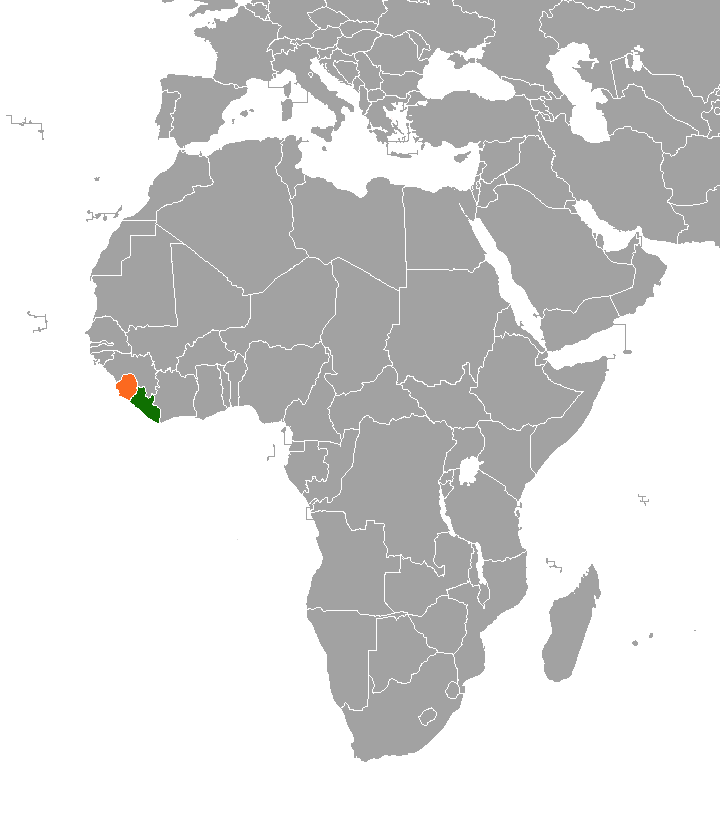
- Sierra Leone (red) and Liberia (green)
- Date: 28 March 2003
- Meeting no.: 4,729
- Code: S/RES/1470 (Document)
- Subject: The situation in Sierra Leone
- Voting summary: 15 voted for; None voted against; None abstained
- Result: Adopted

Security Council composition
- Permanent members: China; France; Russia; United Kingdom; United States
- Non-permanent members: Angola; Bulgaria; Chile; Cameroon; Germany; Guinea; Mexico; Pakistan; Spain; Syria

United Nations Security Council resolution 1470, adopted unanimously on 28 March 2003, after recalling all previous resolutions on the situation in Sierra Leone, the Council extended the mandate of the United Nations Mission in Sierra Leone (UNAMSIL) for six months until 30 September 2003.

== Resolution ==
=== Observations ===
The Security Council expressed concern at the continuing fragile security situation in the Mano River region, especially the civil war in Liberia and its consequences on nearby states including Côte d'Ivoire and the humanitarian situation. It recognised the situation in Sierra Leone and the need to strengthen the Sierra Leone Police in order to maintain security and stability. Furthermore, it was important that there was government authority throughout the country, particularly the diamond fields, reintegration of ex-combatants, respect for human rights and rule of law and the return of refugees and internally displaced persons. The importance of the Special Court for Sierra Leone and support of UNAMSIL was stressed.

=== Acts ===
Extending UNAMSIL's mandate for an additional six months, the Council thanked countries contributing to the force and UNAMSIL for adjustments to its size, composition and deployment. It was asked to take responsibility for the country's internal and external security, while the Secretary-General Kofi Annan was requested to detail plans for its drawdown and withdrawal.

The resolution expressed concern at a shortfall in donations and stressed that the development of administrative capabilities of the Sierra Leonean government was essential to long-term peace. Additionally, the government had made efforts to ensure effective control of the diamond mining areas in Sierra Leone and UNAMSIL civilian police were being deployed. The Council supported the Special Court for Sierra Leone and the launch of the Truth and Reconciliation Commission. Meanwhile, the presidents of the Mano River Union were called upon to resume dialogue and commitments aimed at strengthening regional peace and security.

The Security Council noted instability on the border between Sierra Leone and Liberia and demanded that the Liberian Armed Forces or other armed groups refrain from incursions into Sierra Leone. All states were asked to observe the arms embargo against Liberia and restrictions concerning blood diamonds. The Secretary-General was to keep the situation in Sierra Leone under review, and the Sierra Leone government was requested to pay attention to the needs of women and children.

== See also ==
- List of United Nations Security Council Resolutions 1401 to 1500 (2002–2003)
- Second Liberian Civil War
- Sierra Leone Civil War
- Special Court for Sierra Leone
