= United Nations Security Council Resolution 1480 =

UN Security Council Resolution 1480
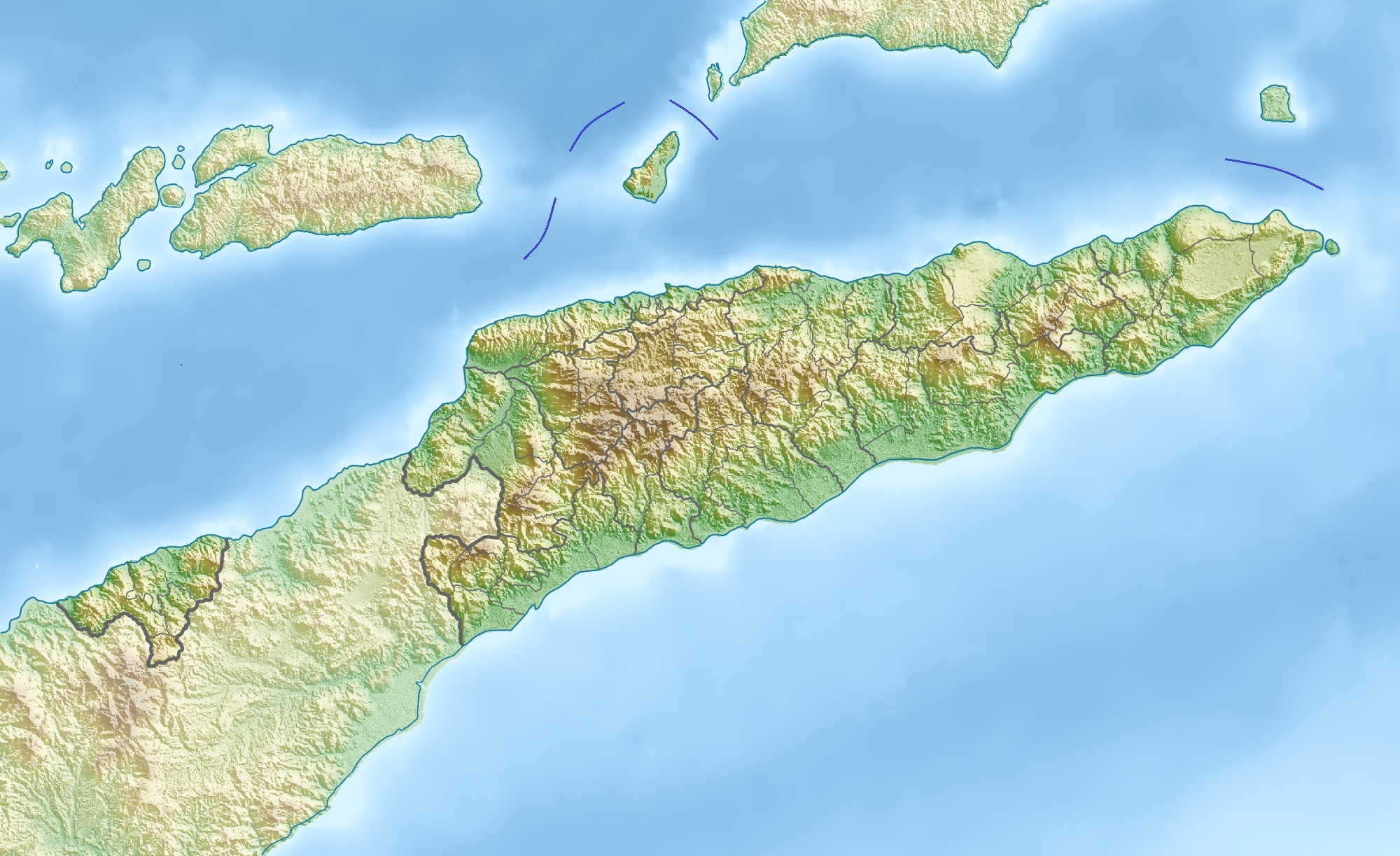
- East Timor
- Date: 19 May 2003
- Meeting no.: 4,758
- Code: S/RES/1480 (Document)
- Subject: The situation in East Timor
- Voting summary: 15 voted for; None voted against; None abstained
- Result: Adopted

Security Council composition
- Permanent members: China; France; Russia; United Kingdom; United States
- Non-permanent members: Angola; Bulgaria; Chile; Cameroon; Germany; Guinea; Mexico; Pakistan; Spain; Syria

United Nations Security Council resolution 1480, adopted unanimously on 19 May 2003, after reaffirming previous resolutions on East Timor (Timor-Leste), particularly resolutions 1410 (2002) and 1473 (2003), the council extended the mandate of the United Nations Mission of Support to East Timor (UNMISET) for a period of twelve months until 19 May 2004.

The Security Council praised the efforts of the East Timorese government and people in developing institutions for an independent state based on democratic values. UNMISET was also commended for developing infrastructure, public administration, law enforcement and defence capabilities. Furthermore, progress in diplomatic relations between East Timor and Indonesia was welcomed and progress with regard to security, border demarcation and bringing to justice those responsible for acts in 1999 was emphasised.

The resolution stressed the priority of improving the capabilities of the National Police of East Timor, the transfer of authority from UNMISET to the government of East Timor and international support throughout the process. A military strategy outlined in a report of the Secretary-General Kofi Annan was noted by the council.

== See also ==
- 1999 East Timorese crisis
- East Timor Special Autonomy Referendum
- Indonesian occupation of East Timor
- List of United Nations Security Council Resolutions 1401 to 1500 (2002–2003)
- United Nations Transitional Administration in East Timor
