= United Nations Security Council Resolution 1419 =

United Nations Security Council resolution

UN Security Council Resolution 1419
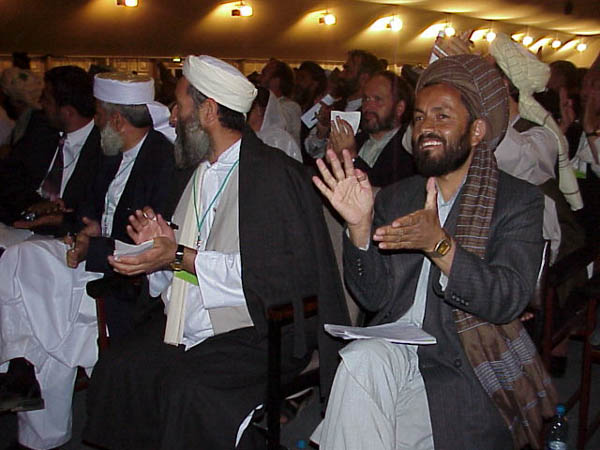
- Members of the Afghan loya jirga in 2002
- Date: 26 June 2002
- Meeting no.: 4,560
- Code: S/RES/1419 (Document)
- Subject: The situation in Afghanistan
- Voting summary: 15 voted for; None voted against; None abstained
- Result: Adopted

Security Council composition
- Permanent members: China; France; Russia; United Kingdom; United States
- Non-permanent members: Bulgaria; Cameroon; Colombia; Guinea; Ireland; Mauritius; Mexico; Norway; Singapore; Syria

United Nations Security Council resolution 1419, adopted unanimously on 26 June 2002, after reaffirming all resolutions on the situation in Afghanistan, particularly Resolution 1383 (2001) and resolutions 1368 (2001) and 1373 (2001) on terrorism, the Council commended the country for the successful conduct of an emergency loya jirga and called for co-operation from the Afghan people with the Transitional Administration.

The Security Council reiterated its support for the Bonn Agreement and its commitment to assist the Afghan people in bringing stability and peace to the country and respect for human rights. It welcomed the holding of an emergency loya jirga from 11 to 19 June 2002 and noted the large participation of women. Furthermore, it encouraged the Afghan people to determine their own political future, welcomed the election of Hamid Karzai as head of state and establishment of the Transitional Authority. All Afghan groups were urged to co-operate with the new authority and for the Transitional Authority to build on the efforts of the Interim Administration with regard to women and girls and education for children and to eradicate the annual poppy crop.

The resolution commended the efforts of the United Nations in supporting the roles of the Afghan people, United Nations Assistance Mission in Afghanistan and the Special Representative of the Secretary-General Lakhdar Brahimi, and the International Security Assistance Force for providing a secure environment. It called for greater international support and assistance in the Afghan process and to the large number of Afghan refugees and internally displaced persons.

== See also ==
- Afghanistan conflict (1978–present)
- List of United Nations Security Council Resolutions 1401 to 1500 (2002–2003)
- War in Afghanistan (2001–2021)
