= United Nations Security Council Resolution 1467 =

UN Security Council Resolution 1467
- West Africa
- Date: 18 March 2003
- Meeting no.: 4,720
- Code: S/RES/1467 (Document)
- Subject: Proliferation of small arms and light weapons and mercenary activities: threats to peace and security in West Africa
- Voting summary: 15 voted for; None voted against; None abstained
- Result: Adopted

Security Council composition
- Permanent members: China; France; Russia; United Kingdom; United States
- Non-permanent members: Angola; Bulgaria; Chile; Cameroon; Germany; Guinea; Mexico; Pakistan; Spain; Syria

United Nations Security Council resolution 1467, adopted unanimously on 18 March 2003, after expressing concern at the situation in West Africa, the Council adopted a declaration regarding the proliferation of weapons and mercenary activities in West Africa.

The declaration was adopted after a daylong high-level meeting attended by more than 20 speakers and chaired by François Lonseny Fall, the foreign minister of Guinea.

== Declaration ==
The Security Council began by expressing concern at and condemning the proliferation of small arms and light weapons, as well as activities by mercenaries in West Africa as contributing to violations of human rights and international humanitarian law. Measures adopted at a domestic level to counter the problem in the region were urged to be put into effect, and greater co-operation among states was emphasised in order to prevent illegal arms trafficking and mercenary activities.

States in West Africa were called upon to consider the following steps to assist in the implementation of the Economic Community of West African States (ECOWAS) Moratorium on Small Arms:

(a) expanding the Moratorium to include an information exchange system;
(b) increasing transparency in armaments through an ECOWAS register recording national inventories of weapons;
(c) strengthening national commissions to monitor the implementation of the Moratorium;
(d) building the capacity of the ECOWAS secretariat;
(e) computerisation of aircraft registration lists to ensure improved monitoring of airspace;
(f) introducing standardised end-user certificates for imported weapons.

The declaration also expressed concern at violations of arms embargoes in West Africa and links between such violations, illegal arms trafficking and mercenary activities. Therefore, there was a need to make the population of the subregion aware of the dangers of arms trafficking and the activities of mercenaries. The Council requested ECOWAS states to submit reports on actions taken to implement the United Nations programme of action on small arms and light weapons to the Secretary-General Kofi Annan. Appealing to the donor community, the resolution called for assistance to states in West Africa in implementing such measures.

The Council further called upon countries in West Africa to recognise the importance of disarmament, demobilisation and reintegration in post-conflict situations and cease support for armed groups in neighbouring countries. Arms-producing countries were requested to strengthen regulations and procedures for arms transfers to West Africa. Finally, the declaration repeated calls for regional and subregional organisations to develop policies for the benefit of war-affected children.

== See also ==
- History of West Africa
- Ivorian Civil War
- List of United Nations Security Council Resolutions 1401 to 1500 (2002–2003)
- Second Liberian Civil War
- Sierra Leone Civil War
