= United Nations Security Council Resolution 1442 =

UN Security Council Resolution 1442
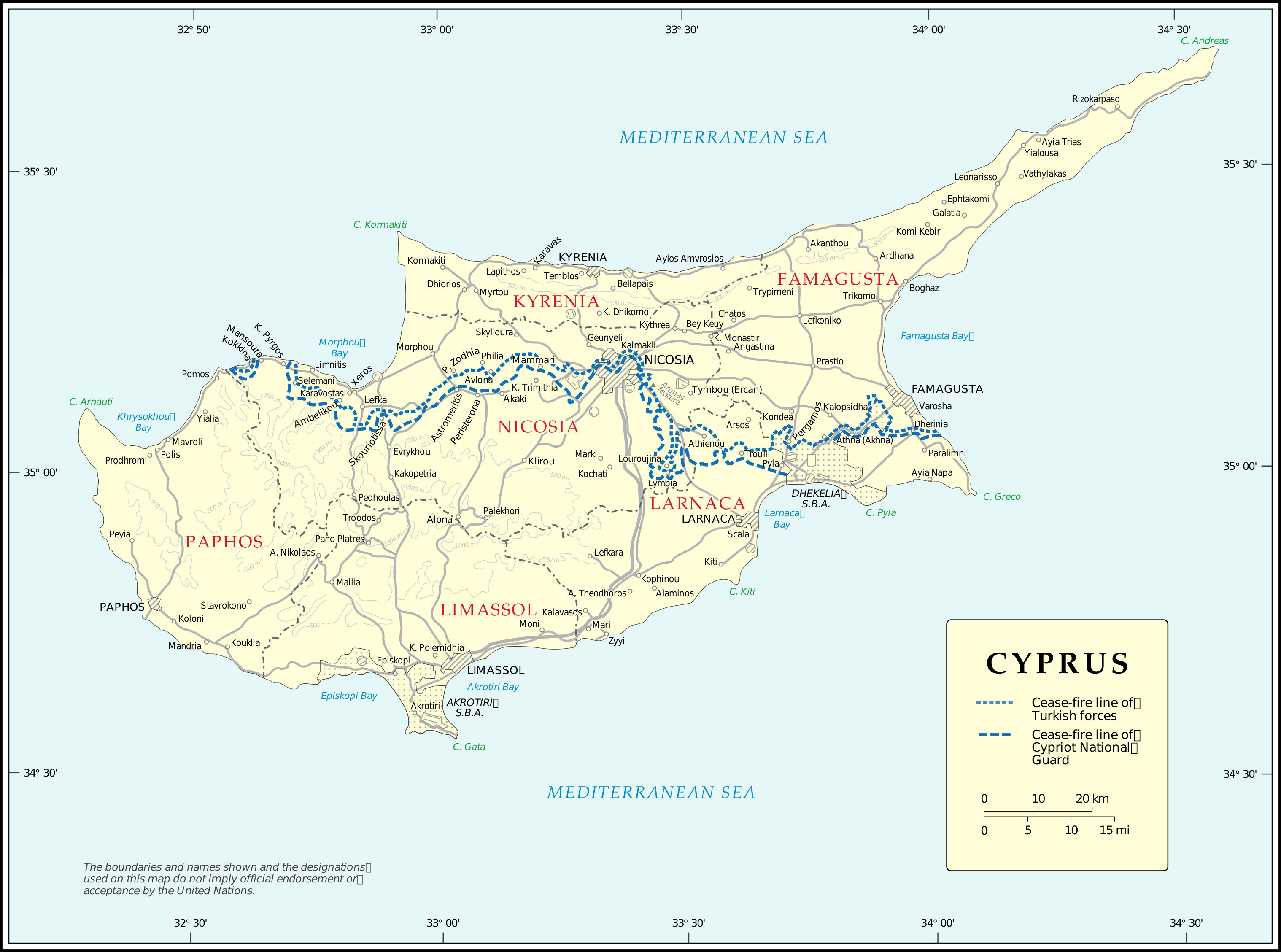
- Cyprus with ceasefire lines (blue)
- Date: 25 November 2002
- Meeting no.: 4,649
- Code: S/RES/1442 (Document)
- Subject: The situation in Cyprus
- Voting summary: 15 voted for; None voted against; None abstained
- Result: Adopted

Security Council composition
- Permanent members: China; France; Russia; United Kingdom; United States
- Non-permanent members: Bulgaria; Cameroon; Colombia; Guinea; Ireland; Mauritius; Mexico; Norway; Singapore; Syria

United Nations Security Council resolution 1442, adopted unanimously on 25 November 2002, after reaffirming all resolutions on the situation in Cyprus, particularly Resolution 1251 (1999), the council extended the mandate of the United Nations Peacekeeping Force in Cyprus (UNFICYP) for an additional six months until 15 June 2003.

The security council noted the call within the Secretary-General Kofi Annan's report for the authorities in Cyprus and Northern Cyprus to urgently address the humanitarian situation concerning missing persons. It also welcomed efforts to sensitise United Nations peacekeeping personnel towards the prevention and control of HIV/AIDS and other diseases.

Extending UNFICYP's mandate, the resolution requested the secretary-general to report to the council by 1 June 2003 on the implementation of the current resolution. It also urged the Turkish Cypriot side to end restrictions imposed on 30 June 2000 on UNIFCYP operations and to restore the military status quo at Strovilia.

== See also ==
- Annan Plan for Cyprus
- Cyprus problem
- List of United Nations Security Council Resolutions 1401 to 1500 (2002–2003)
- United Nations Buffer Zone in Cyprus
- Turkish invasion of Cyprus
