= United Nations Security Council Resolution 1482 =

UN Security Council Resolution 1482
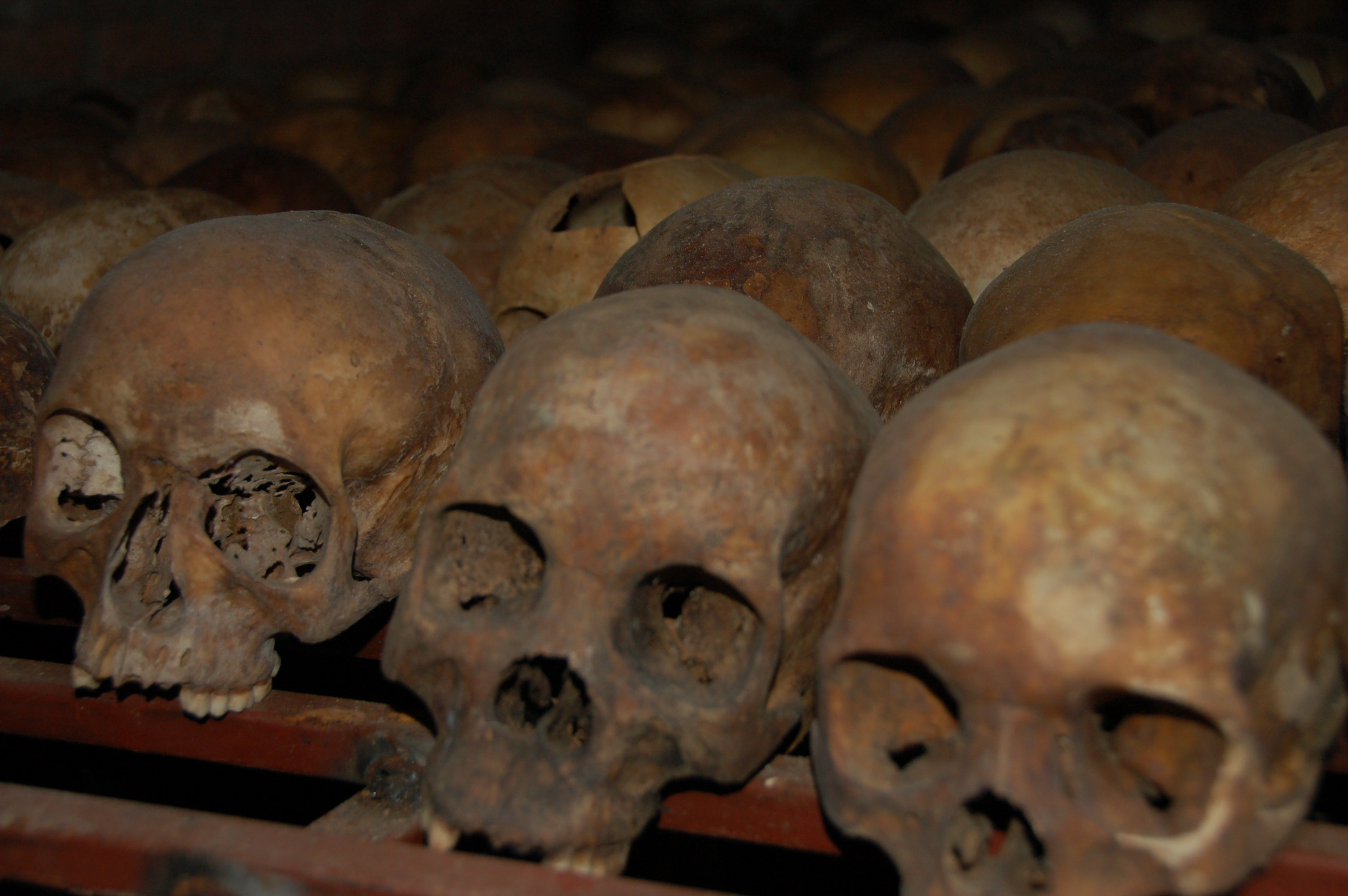
- Skulls from the 1994 genocide in Rwanda
- Date: 19 May 2003
- Meeting no.: 4,760
- Code: S/RES/1482 (Document)
- Subject: The International Criminal Tribunal for Rwanda
- Voting summary: 15 voted for; None voted against; None abstained
- Result: Adopted

Security Council composition
- Permanent members: China; France; Russia; United Kingdom; United States
- Non-permanent members: Angola; Bulgaria; Chile; Cameroon; Germany; Guinea; Mexico; Pakistan; Spain; Syria

United Nations Security Council resolution 1482, adopted unanimously on 19 May 2003, after noting correspondence between the President of the Security Council, President of the International Criminal Tribunal for Rwanda (ICTR) and President of the International Criminal Court, the Council extended the terms of office of four permanent judges at the ICTR in order to allow them to dispose of a number of ongoing cases.

Responding to a request by the Secretary-General Kofi Annan, the Security Council extended the terms of four judges who were not re-elected for a second term of office at elections on 31 January 2003, and whose terms were to expire on 24 May 2003. They had begun cases before their terms were due to expire. The decision was taken in order to avoid starting the trials again with new judges, rehearing of witnesses and the representation of arguments. The four judges were:

(a) Judge Pavel Dolenc (Slovenia), in order to complete the Cyangugu case;
(b) Judge Yakov Ostrovsky (Russia), in order to complete the Cyangugu case;
(c) Judge Winston Maqutu (Lesotho), in order to complete the Kajelijeli and Kamuhanda cases;
(d) Judge Navanethem Pillay (South Africa), in order to complete the Media case.

The resolution noted that the Cyangugu case was expected to be completed by the end of February 2004, while the Kajelijeli, Kamuhanda and Media cases were expected to be completed by the end of December 2003. The President of the ICTR was requested to provide three reports, by 1 August and 15 November 2003 and 15 January 2004 concerning progress on the cases mentioned in the current resolution to the Security Council.

== See also ==
- List of United Nations Security Council Resolutions 1401 to 1500 (2002–2003)
- Rwandan genocide
