= United Nations Security Council Resolution 1468 =

UN Security Council Resolution 1468
- Ituri Province region of the Democratic Republic of the Congo
- Date: 20 March 2003
- Meeting no.: 4,723
- Code: S/RES/1468 (Document)
- Subject: The situation concerning the Democratic Republic of the Congo
- Voting summary: 15 voted for; None voted against; None abstained
- Result: Adopted

Security Council composition
- Permanent members: China; France; Russia; United Kingdom; United States
- Non-permanent members: Angola; Bulgaria; Chile; Cameroon; Germany; Guinea; Mexico; Pakistan; Spain; Syria

United Nations Security Council resolution 1468, adopted unanimously on 20 March 2003, after recalling previous resolutions on the situation in the Democratic Republic of the Congo, the Council welcomed an agreement on the establishment of a transitional government and requested an increased presence of the United Nations Mission in the Democratic Republic of Congo (MONUC) in the Ituri region in the east of the country amid escalating violence.

== Resolution ==
=== Observations ===
The Security Council appreciated the report of the Office of the United Nations High Commissioner for Human Rights (OHCHR) concerning the situation in Ituri province. Furthermore, it welcomed the Angolan government for ensuring the implementation of an agreement for a settlement of the situation in Ituri, and the South African government in assisting the Congolese parties to reach an agreement on transitional arrangements. The situation in the country continued to constitute a threat to international peace and security in the African Great Lakes region.

=== Acts ===
The resolution welcomed an agreement on 6 March 2003 by the Congolese parties to establish a transitional government and urged the parties to do so as soon as possible without delay. It condemned massacres and other violations of international humanitarian law and human rights, particularly against women and girls, and the activities of the Movement for the Liberation of Congo, Rally for Congolese Democracy and Union of Congolese Patriots in Ituri. The Council urged that the names of military officers mentioned in the OHCHR report had to be brought to justice. In this regard, the Congolese parties were urged to take this into account when appointing members for the new government, to establish a Truth and Reconciliation Commission and respect human rights and international humanitarian law.

Meanwhile, the Secretary-General Kofi Annan was requested to increase MONUC's human rights component and the operation's presence in the Ituri area. The Security Council expressed concern at fighting in the city of Bunia, and called for a ceasefire and immediate end to hostilities. It demanded that all governments in the Great Lakes region cease military and financial support for parties involved in the armed conflict in Ituri, and that Uganda withdraw its forces and for Rwanda to refrain from returning its troops to the Democratic Republic of the Congo. There was also concern at tensions between Uganda and Rwanda and their proxies in the Democratic Republic of the Congo, and all parties were urged to guarantee the safety of civilians and MONUC personnel in the Ituri region.

The Council reiterated concerns about the lack of information with regard to the use and recruitment of child soldiers and the protection of children as mentioned in Resolution 1460 (2003), as well as demands contained in resolutions 1261 (1999), 1314 (2000) and 1379 (2001). Furthermore, the resolution demanded unimpeded access to the Third Party Verification Mechanism and MONUC in order to assess allegations of the presence of Rwandan troops on Congolese territory and support offered by the Congolese government to armed groups in the east of the country.

Finally, full support was given to the third phase of deployment of MONUC in accordance with Resolution 1445 (2002).

== See also ==
- Kivu conflict
- Ituri conflict
- List of United Nations Security Council Resolutions 1401 to 1500 (2002–2003)
- Lusaka Ceasefire Agreement
- Second Congo War
