= United Nations Security Council Resolution 1425 =

UN Security Council Resolution 1425
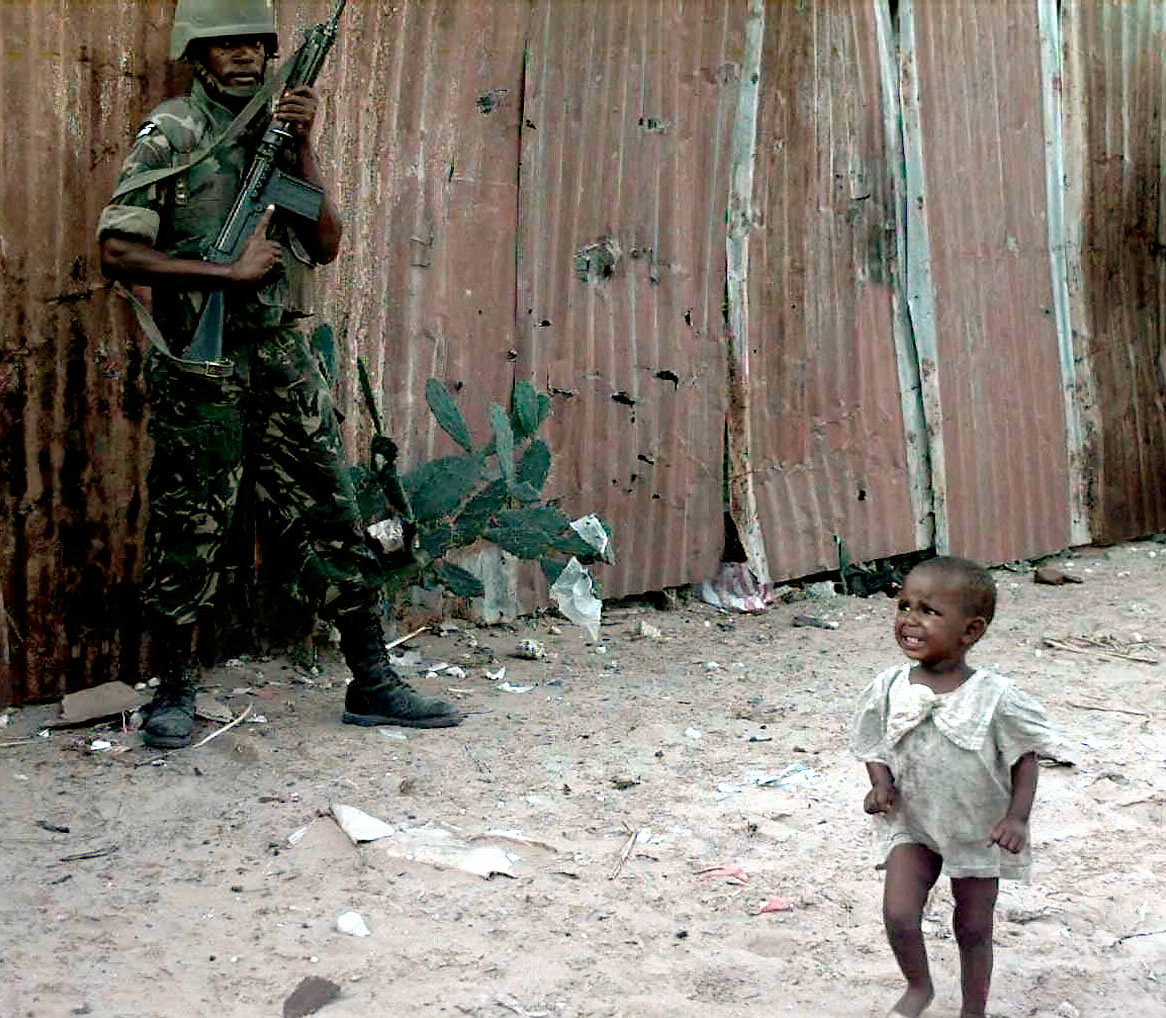
- Botswanan soldier conducting arms raids in Somalia
- Date: 22 July 2002
- Meeting no.: 4,580
- Code: S/RES/1425 (Document)
- Subject: The situation in Somalia
- Voting summary: 15 voted for; None voted against; None abstained
- Result: Adopted

Security Council composition
- Permanent members: China; France; Russia; United Kingdom; United States
- Non-permanent members: Bulgaria; Cameroon; Colombia; Guinea; Ireland; Mauritius; Mexico; Norway; Singapore; Syria

United Nations Security Council resolution 1425, adopted unanimously on 22 July 2002, after recalling resolutions on the situation in Somalia, particularly resolutions 733 (1992) and 1407 (2002), the council established a panel of experts to investigate violations of the arms embargo against the country.

The security council president said that the adoption of the resolution was aimed at hindering arms flows into the country, particularly as a recent United Nations report found that weapons had entered Somalia from neighbouring countries and others including Iran, Latvia, Libya, Poland, the United Arab Emirates and United States.

== Resolution ==
=== Observations ===
The security council expressed concern at continued trafficking of arms and ammunition to Somalia from other countries which undermined peace, security and political and national reconciliation efforts in the country. It reiterated its call on all states to comply with the arms embargo and to refrain from interfering in the internal affairs of Somalia. At the same time, the role of frontline states (Djibouti, Ethiopia and Kenya) in bringing a durable peace to the country was emphasised.

=== Acts ===
Acting under Chapter VII of the United Nations Charter, the council stressed that the arms embargo prohibited the financing or delivering of weapons and military advice to Somalia. The secretary-general Kofi Annan was requested to establish a panel of three experts based in Nairobi for six months to investigate violations of the arms embargo by land, air and sea; detail information related to the violations and to enforcement of the embargo; carry out field research in Somalia and other countries; assess the capacity of states in the region to fully implement the arms embargo, including by review of national customs and border control; and to recommend steps to strengthen its enforcement. Furthermore, the panel was required to have access to expertise in areas of civil aviation, maritime transport, regional affairs and knowledge of the country.

The resolution requested the full co-operation of neighbouring states, the Transitional National Government (TNG) in Somalia and other entities or individuals by providing unhindered access to information for the expert panel and for states to provide information on violations of the arms embargo; instances of non-compliance were to be reported to the council. The panel was instructed to report to the security council by November 2002 and at the end of its mandated period. The report would be considered and further action taken if necessary to improve the effectiveness of the embargo. Meanwhile, the secretary-general was requested to report on peace-building initiatives, technical assistance and co-operation and measures countries had taken to implement the arms embargo by 31 October 2002.

Finally, the council concluded by calling for contributions from the international community to the United Nations Trust Fund for Peace-Building in Somalia and United Nations activities.

== See also ==
- List of United Nations Security Council Resolutions 1401 to 1500 (2002–2003)
- Somali Civil War
