= United Nations Security Council Resolution 1486 =

UN Security Council Resolution 1486
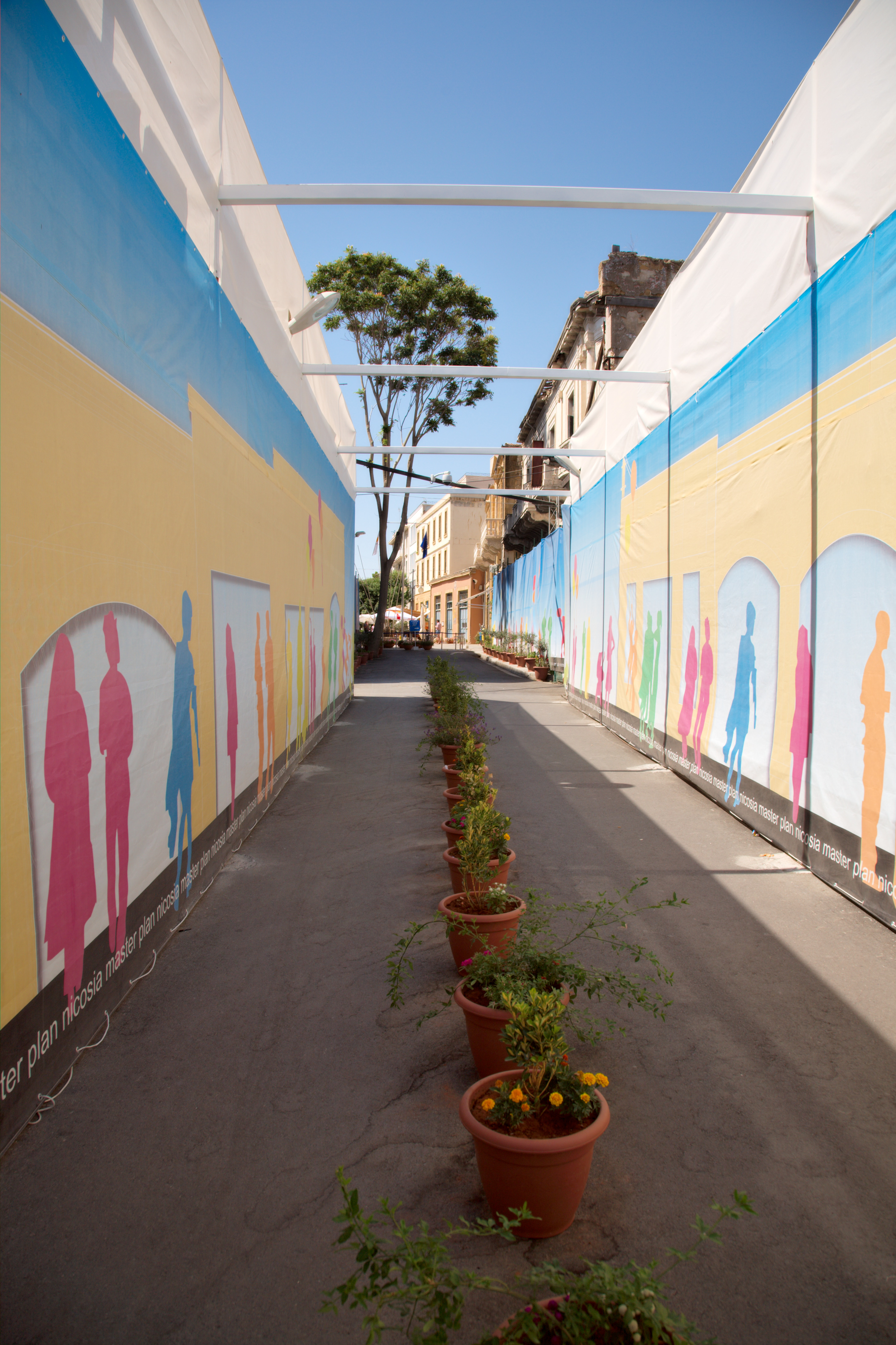
- Border crossing on Ledra Street in the United Nations buffer zone
- Date: 11 June 2003
- Meeting no.: 4,771
- Code: S/RES/1486 (Document)
- Subject: The situation in Cyprus
- Voting summary: 15 voted for; None voted against; None abstained
- Result: Adopted

Security Council composition
- Permanent members: China; France; Russia; United Kingdom; United States
- Non-permanent members: Angola; Bulgaria; Chile; Cameroon; Germany; Guinea; Mexico; Pakistan; Spain; Syria

United Nations Security Council resolution 1486, adopted unanimously on 11 June 2003, after reaffirming all resolutions on the situation in Cyprus, particularly Resolution 1251 (1999), the council extended the mandate of the United Nations Peacekeeping Force in Cyprus (UNFICYP) for an additional six months until 15 December 2003.

The security council noted the call within the Secretary-General Kofi Annan's report for the authorities in Cyprus and Northern Cyprus to urgently address the humanitarian situation concerning missing persons. It also welcomed efforts to sensitise United Nations peacekeeping personnel towards the prevention and control of HIV/AIDS and other diseases.

Extending UNFICYP's mandate, the resolution endorsed an increase of up to 34 UNFICYP police personnel after the partial lifting of restrictions on the freedom of movement between the Greek and Turkish sides on the island. It also noted limited steps by the Turkish Cypriot side to ease some restrictions imposed on 30 June 2000 on UNIFCYP operations, calling for the remaining restrictions to be lifted. There was concern at further violations by the Turkish Cypriot side and they were urged to restore the military status quo at Strovilia.

Finally, the secretary-general was requested to report to the council by 1 December 2003 on the implementation of the current resolution.

== See also ==
- Annan Plan for Cyprus
- Cyprus problem
- List of United Nations Security Council Resolutions 1401 to 1500 (2002–2003)
- United Nations Buffer Zone in Cyprus
- Turkish invasion of Cyprus
