= United Nations Security Council Resolution 1488 =

UN Security Council Resolution 1488
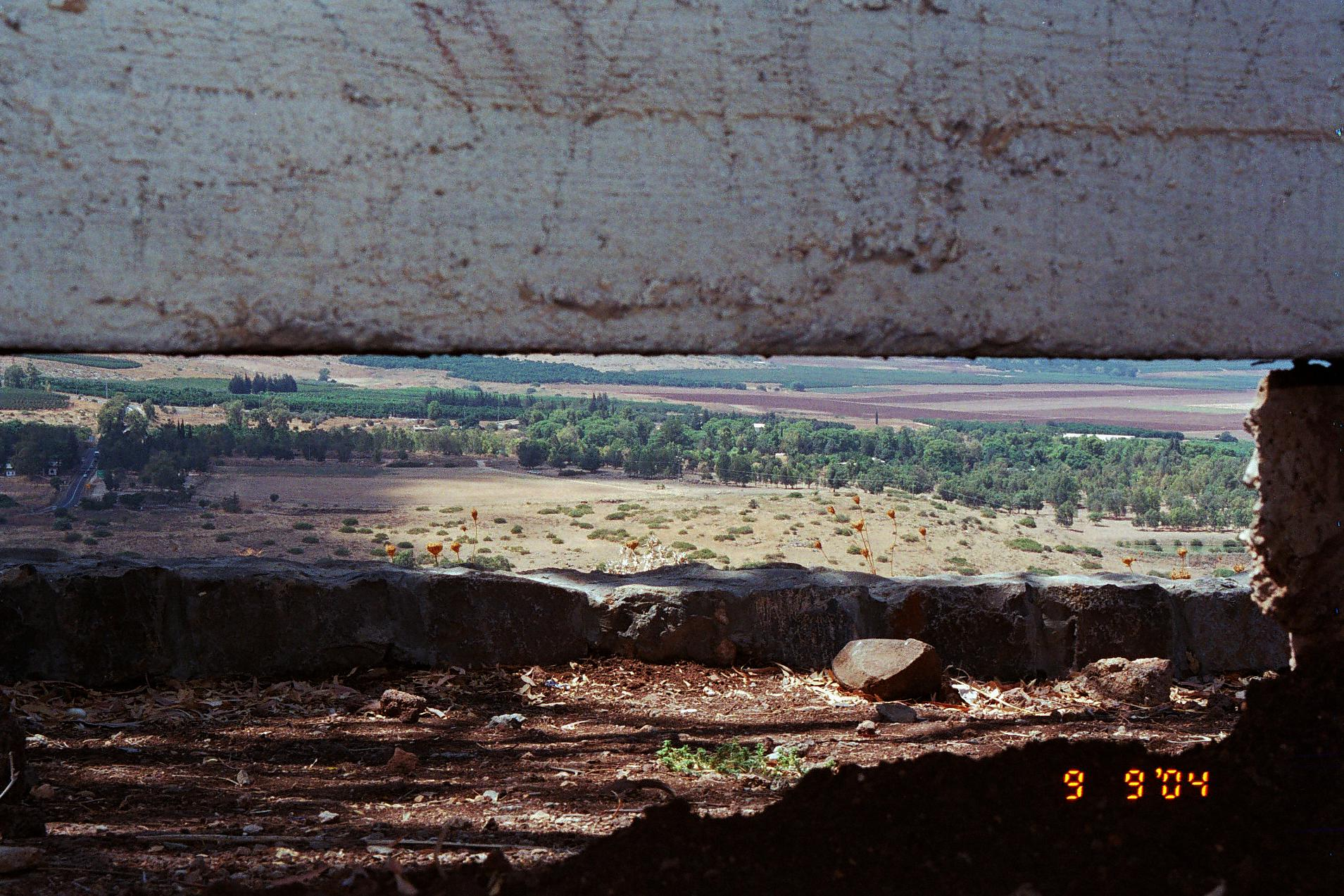
- View from old Syrian bunker overlooking Israeli territory
- Date: 26 June 2003
- Meeting no.: 4,779
- Code: S/RES/1488 (Document)
- Subject: The situation in the Middle East
- Voting summary: 15 voted for; None voted against; None abstained
- Result: Adopted

Security Council composition
- Permanent members: China; France; Russia; United Kingdom; United States
- Non-permanent members: Angola; Bulgaria; Chile; Cameroon; Germany; Guinea; Mexico; Pakistan; Spain; Syria

United Nations Security Council resolution 1488, adopted unanimously on 26 June 2003, after considering a report by the Secretary-General Kofi Annan regarding the United Nations Disengagement Observer Force (UNDOF), the Council extended its mandate for a further six months until 31 December 2003.

The resolution called upon the parties concerned to immediately implement Resolution 338 (1973) and requested that the Secretary-General submit a report on the situation at the end of that period.

The Secretary-General's report pursuant to the previous resolution on UNDOF said that the situation between Israel and Syria had remained generally calm, though the situation in the Middle East as a whole remained dangerous until a settlement could be reached. He also reported two incidents where one Syrian soldier was killed and another captured; the soldier was subsequently released through UNDOF intervention.

== See also ==
- Arab–Israeli conflict
- Golan Heights
- Israel–Syria relations
- List of United Nations Security Council Resolutions 1401 to 1500 (2002–2003)
- 2000–2006 Shebaa Farms conflict
