= United Nations Security Council Resolution 1499 =

UN Security Council Resolution 1499
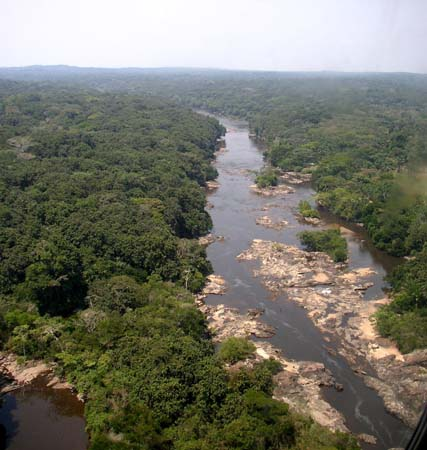
- Epulu River in the Ituri region of the Democratic Republic of the Congo
- Date: 13 August 2003
- Meeting no.: 4,807
- Code: S/RES/1499 (Document)
- Subject: The situation concerning the Democratic Republic of the Congo
- Voting summary: 15 voted for; None voted against; None abstained
- Result: Adopted

Security Council composition
- Permanent members: China; France; Russia; United Kingdom; United States
- Non-permanent members: Angola; Bulgaria; Chile; Cameroon; Germany; Guinea; Mexico; Pakistan; Spain; Syria

United Nations Security Council resolution 1499, adopted unanimously on 13 August 2003, after recalling previous resolutions on the situation in the Democratic Republic of the Congo, including resolutions 1457 (2003) and 1493 (2003), the Council extended the mandate of a panel investigating the plundering of natural resources in the country until 31 October 2003.

The Security Council welcomed the establishment of a transitional national government in the Democratic Republic of the Congo, but noted that illegal exploitation of the country's natural resources continued to take place, particularly in the east. It recognised that the exchange of information and attempts to resolve issues would assist in the transparency of the panel's work, highlight the issue of the exploitation of natural resources and the connections with arms trafficking.

The Secretary-General Kofi Annan was requested to extend the investigative panel's mandate until 31 October 2003, when it would be due to report its findings. The resolution reiterated the council's demand that all relevant states immediately end the illegal exploitation of natural resources in the Democratic Republic of the Congo. The panel was instructed to provide information to the concerned governments in order for them to take appropriate action.

The investigative panel named individuals and companies implicated in illegal activities and which further measures would be taken.

== See also ==
- Kivu conflict
- Ituri conflict
- List of United Nations Security Council Resolutions 1401 to 1500 (2002–2003)
- Lusaka Ceasefire Agreement
- Second Congo War
