= United Nations Security Council Resolution 1475 =

UN Security Council Resolution 1475
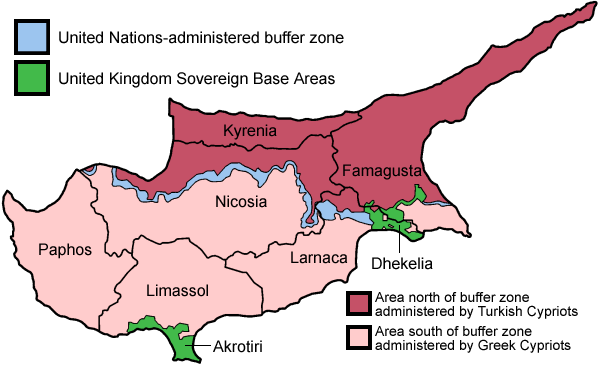
- Divided Cyprus
- Date: 14 April 2003
- Meeting no.: 4,740
- Code: S/RES/1475 (Document)
- Subject: The situation in Cyprus
- Voting summary: 15 voted for; None voted against; None abstained
- Result: Adopted

Security Council composition
- Permanent members: China; France; Russia; United Kingdom; United States
- Non-permanent members: Angola; Bulgaria; Chile; Cameroon; Germany; Guinea; Mexico; Pakistan; Spain; Syria

United Nations Security Council resolution 1475, adopted unanimously on 14 April 2003, after reaffirming all resolutions on the situation in Cyprus, particularly Resolution 1250 (1999), the Council regretted the failure to reach agreement on a settlement plan for the country, due to the "negative approach" of the Turkish Cypriot leadership.

The resolution reiterated the importance of achieving an overall political settlement in Cyprus and commended the Secretary-General Kofi Annan for using his initiative to present a settlement plan to lessen the differences between the Republic of Cyprus and Northern Cyprus. It regretted the approach of the Turkish Cypriot leadership that delayed a possible agreement on a plan for simultaneous referendums denying the Turkish and Greek Cypriots a chance to decide themselves, which meant there would be no conclusion before 16 April 2003 when Cyprus' accession to the European Union would be signed. The council had described the Secretary-General's plan as providing a "unique basis" for further talks.

The Security Council supported Kofi Annan's plan of 26 February 2003 and called upon all concerned to negotiate within the framework of his good offices.

== See also ==
- Annan Plan for Cyprus
- Cyprus problem
- List of United Nations Security Council Resolutions 1401 to 1500 (2002–2003)
- United Nations Buffer Zone in Cyprus
- United Nations Peacekeeping Force in Cyprus
- Turkish invasion of Cyprus
