= United Nations Security Council Resolution 1477 =

UN Security Council Resolution 1477
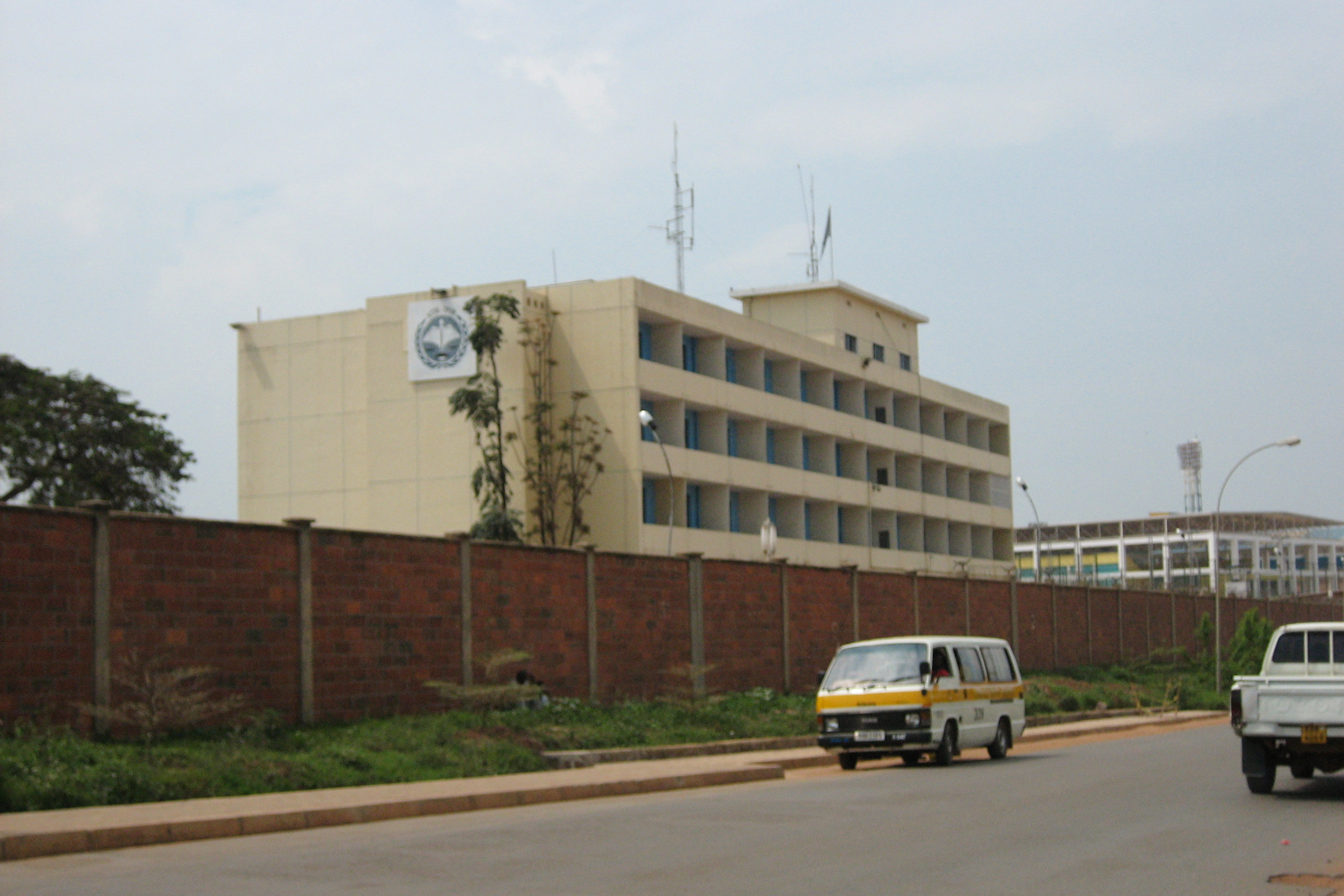
- ICTR building in Kigali, Rwanda
- Date: 29 April 2003
- Meeting no.: 4,745
- Code: S/RES/1477 (Document)
- Subject: The International Criminal Tribunal for Rwanda
- Voting summary: 15 voted for; None voted against; None abstained
- Result: Adopted

Security Council composition
- Permanent members: China; France; Russia; United Kingdom; United States
- Non-permanent members: Angola; Bulgaria; Chile; Cameroon; Germany; Guinea; Mexico; Pakistan; Spain; Syria

United Nations Security Council resolution 1477, adopted unanimously on 29 April 2003, after recalling resolutions 955 (1994), 1165 (1998), 1329 (2000), 1411 (2002) and 1431 (2002), the Council forwarded a list of nominees for permanent judges at the International Criminal Tribunal for Rwanda (ICTR) to the General Assembly for consideration.

The list of 35 nominees received by the Secretary-General Kofi Annan was as follows:

- Achta Saker Abdoul (Chad)
- Aydin Sefa Akay (Turkey)
- Florence Rita Arrey (Cameroon)
- Abdoulaye Barry (Burkina Faso)
- Miguel Antonio Bernal (Panama)
- Solomy Balungi Bossa (Uganda)
- Robert Fremr (Czech Republic)
- Silvio Guerra Morales (Panama)
- Taghreed Hikmat (Jordan)
- Karin Hökborg (Sweden)
- Vagn Joensen (Denmark)
- Gberdao Gustave Kam (Burkina Faso)
- Joseph-Médard Kaba Kashala Katuala (Democratic Republic of the Congo)
- Engera A. Kileo (Tanzania)
- Nathalia P. Kimaro (Tanzania)
- Agnieszka Klonowiecka-Milart (Poland)
- Flavia Lattanzi (Italy)
- Kenneth Machin (United Kingdom)
- Joseph Edward Chiondo Masanche (Tanzania)
- Patrick Matibini (Zambia)
- Edouard Ngarta Mbaïouroum (Chad)
- Antoine Kesia-Mbe Mindua (Democratic Republic of the Congo)
- Tan Sri Dato Hj. Mohd. Azmi Dato Hj. Kamaruddin (Malaysia)
- Lee Gacuiga Muthoga (Kenya)
- Laurent Ngaoundi (Chad)
- Beradingar Ngonyame (Chad)
- Daniel Nsereko (Uganda)
- Seon Ki Park (South Korea)
- Tatiana Răducanu (Moldova)
- Mparany Mamy Richard Rajohnson (Madagascar)
- Edward Mukandara K. Rutakangwa (Tanzania)
- Emile Francis Short (Ghana)
- Albertus Henricus Joannes Swart (Netherlands)
- Xenofon Ulianovschi (Moldova)
- Aura Emérita Guerra de Villalaz (Panama)

18 of the judges would be selected to serve at the Tribunal, which, at the time, was expected to complete its work in 2008.

== See also ==
- List of United Nations Security Council Resolutions 1401 to 1500 (2002–2003)
- Rwandan genocide
