= United Nations Security Council Resolution 1445 =

UN Security Council Resolution 1445
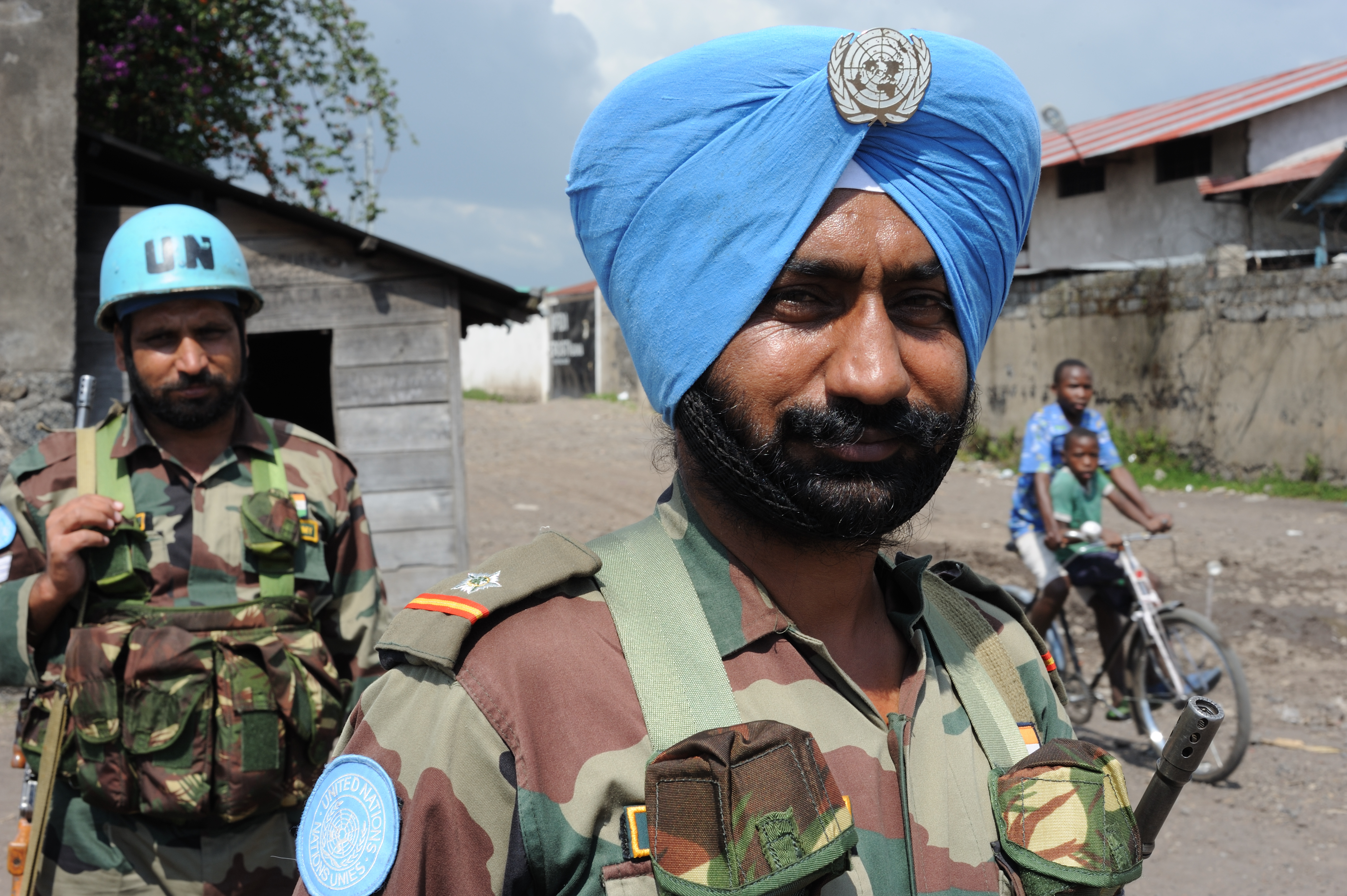
- MONUC peacekeepers in the Democratic Republic of the Congo
- Date: 4 December 2002
- Meeting no.: 4,653
- Code: S/RES/1445 (Document)
- Subject: The situation concerning the Democratic Republic of the Congo
- Voting summary: 15 voted for; None voted against; None abstained
- Result: Adopted

Security Council composition
- Permanent members: China; France; Russia; United Kingdom; United States
- Non-permanent members: Bulgaria; Cameroon; Colombia; Guinea; Ireland; Mauritius; Mexico; Norway; Singapore; Syria

United Nations Security Council resolution 1445 was adopted unanimously on 4 December 2002. After recalling all previous resolutions on situation in the Democratic Republic of the Congo, the council expanded the military component of the United Nations Mission in the Democratic Republic of Congo (MONUC) to a level of 8,700 military personnel–up from 4,250–in two task forces.

Secretary-General Kofi Annan was concerned that the authorised number of troops could not be provided. Meanwhile, the United States had attempted to introduce language into the resolution that would have prevented American peacekeepers (of which there were none in the Democratic Republic of the Congo) from indictment by the International Criminal Court. Other council members objected to its inclusion and the United States withdrew its demand.

== Resolution ==
=== Observations ===
The Security Council stressed the obligation of all states to refrain from using force against the independence and territorial integrity of another state. It reaffirmed the sovereignty of the Democratic Republic of the Congo over its natural resources. Furthermore, the council recognized the need for a gender perspective in accordance with Resolution 1325 (2000) and protection of children in accordance with Resolution 1379 (2001). It determined that the situation constituted a threat to international peace and security.

=== Acts ===
The signing of the Pretoria Accord between the Democratic Republic of the Congo and Rwanda and that of the Luanda Agreement between the Democratic Republic of the Congo and Uganda were welcomed by the council. Meanwhile, the decision of Angola, Rwanda, Uganda and Zimbabwe to fully withdraw their troops was also welcomed. It stressed the importance of the voluntary disarmament, demobilisation, repatriation, reintegration and resettlement (DDRRR) program and for all armed groups to participate in the process.

The council welcomed the repatriation of ex-combatants from Kamina and the banning of activities of the Democratic Forces for the Liberation of Rwanda by the Congolese government throughout its territory. There were positive developments on the ground and there was a commitment among Congolese parties to achieve an inclusive political transition. In this regard, the resolution authorised an expansion of MONUC of up to 8,700 military personnel in two task forces; the second force would be deployed once the DDR caseload could not be met by the existing capacity of the first task force.

The resolution emphasised that the main responsibility for a settlement of the conflict rested with the parties themselves, and in this regard, called for:

- a cessation of hostilities by regular forces and armed groups;
- an end to the support of armed groups;
- the provision of full access for MONUC and TPVM (which oversaw the Rwandan withdrawal) throughout the country;
- the surrender of persons indicted by the International Criminal Tribunal for Rwanda;
- the demilitarisation of Kisangani;
- the restoration of freedom of movement in the Congo River.

There was concern at the humanitarian situation in the Democratic Republic of the Congo, particularly in Ituri Province where there was an increase in ethnic violence. The council called for full access by humanitarian organisations to populations in need. It reiterated that there should be no support for groups fighting in the east of the country, calling on MONUC to continue assessing police training and capabilities particularly in the Itrui region.

The concluding paragraphs of the resolution encouraged the normalisation of diplomatic relations between the Democratic Republic of the Congo, Rwanda and Uganda, and the importance of preventing the spread of the conflict to nearby states including Burundi, the Central African Republic, Rwanda and Uganda. Finally, the harassment of Radio Okapi staff was condemned and a conference on peace, security, democracy and development in the African Great Lakes region was called for.

== See also ==
- Kivu conflict
- Ituri conflict
- List of United Nations Security Council Resolutions 1401 to 1500 (2002–2003)
- Lusaka Ceasefire Agreement
- Second Congo War
