= United Nations Security Council Resolution 1472 =

UN Security Council Resolution 1472
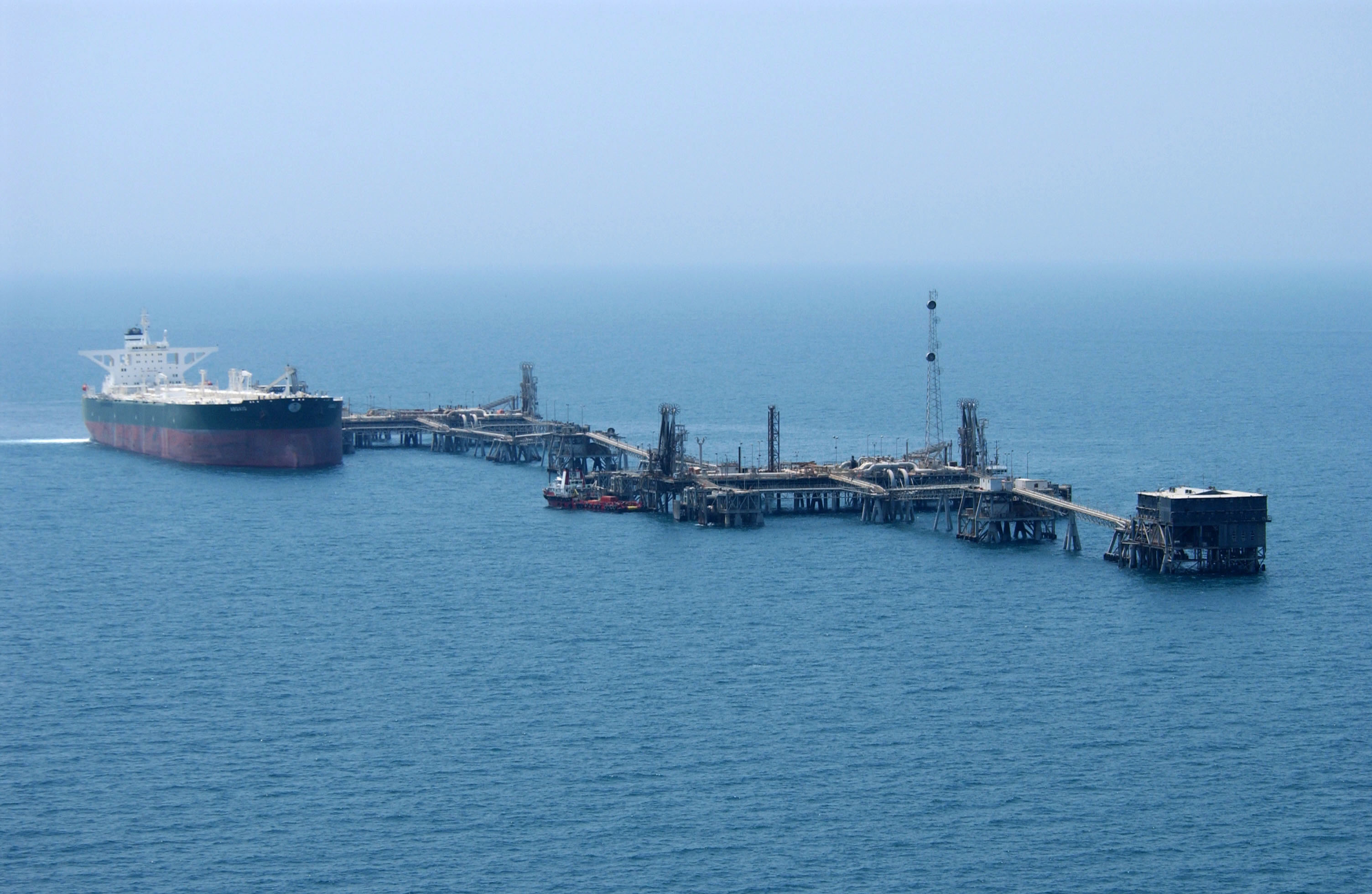
- Offshore Iraqi oil terminal
- Date: 28 March 2003
- Meeting no.: 4,732
- Code: S/RES/1472 (Document)
- Subject: The situation between Iraq and Kuwait
- Voting summary: 15 voted for; None voted against; None abstained
- Result: Adopted

Security Council composition
- Permanent members: China; France; Russia; United Kingdom; United States
- Non-permanent members: Angola; Bulgaria; Chile; Cameroon; Germany; Guinea; Mexico; Pakistan; Spain; Syria

United Nations Security Council resolution 1472, adopted unanimously on 28 March 2003, after recalling all previous resolutions on Iraq, including resolutions 661 (1991), 986 (1995), 1409 (2002) and 1454 (2002) concerning the provision of humanitarian aid to the Iraqi people, the Council approved adjustments to the Oil-for-Food Programme giving the Secretary-General more authority to administer the programme for the following 45 days. The programme had been suspended when the Secretary-General ordered all United Nations staff out of Iraq days before the U.S.-led invasion.

The resolution was adopted after a week of closed negotiations, with France, Russia and Syria objecting to the use of humanitarian money to fund military operations against Iraq. Nearly 70 countries participated in the discussions, with many voicing their opposition to the U.S.-led invasion of Iraq.

== Resolution ==
=== Observations ===
The Security Council noted that, according to the Fourth Geneva Convention of 1949, the occupying power is responsible for the provision of food and medical supplies, particularly if the resources of the occupied territory are inadequate. It was convinced of the need for a temporary measure to provide humanitarian assistance to the Iraqi people throughout the country and to extend such measures to those who left Iraq due to the ongoing war.

Furthermore, it noted the decision of the Secretary-General Kofi Annan to withdraw all staff working on the implementation of the Oil-for-Food Programme from Iraq on 17 March 2003. It reaffirmed the necessity for the provision of humanitarian relief and the need for further reassessment of the Programme. The right of the Iraqi people to control their natural resources and determine their own political future was reaffirmed.

=== Acts ===
Acting under Chapter VII of the United Nations Charter, all parties concerned were urged to abide by their obligations under international law and the international community called upon to provide humanitarian relief to the Iraqi people both inside and outside the country. In view of the circumstances in Iraq, the Council recognised the need to temporarily alter the Programme to ensure implementation of funded and non-funded contracts concluded by the Iraqi government to meet the needs of refugees and internally displaced persons. In this regard, the Secretary-General was authorised to:

(a) establish alternative locations for the delivery, inspection and confirmation of humanitarian supplies both inside and outside Iraq;
(b) review funded and non-funded contracts to determine priorities of relative supplies for essential civilian needs;
(c) contact suppliers of the goods to determine their location;
(d) negotiate and agree adjustments to the contracts;
(e) negotiate and commence new contracts for essential medical supplies;
(f) transfer unencumbered funds between accounts created in Resolution 986 to ensure the delivery of humanitarian supplies;
(g) use additional funds to compensate suppliers for additional costs;
(h) meet further operational and administrative costs resulting from the adjusted Programme;
(i) use funds in the accounts to purchase locally produced goods.

Additional activities would be authorised when the situation in the country improved and further funds would be made available. All applications made outside the Oil-for-Food Programme would be reviewed by the Committee of the Security Council established in Resolution 661, which would also monitor the new provisions in the current resolution. The new provisions would remain in effect for 45 days, subject to further renewal. Meanwhile, all concerned parties were called upon to allow unimpeded access by international humanitarian organisations to the people of Iraq and promote their safety and freedom of movement and that of the United Nations personnel.

== See also ==
- Gulf War
- Invasion of Kuwait
- Iraq sanctions
- List of United Nations Security Council Resolutions 1401 to 1500 (2002–2003)
- Iraq War
