= United Nations Security Council Resolution 1484 =

UN Security Council Resolution 1484
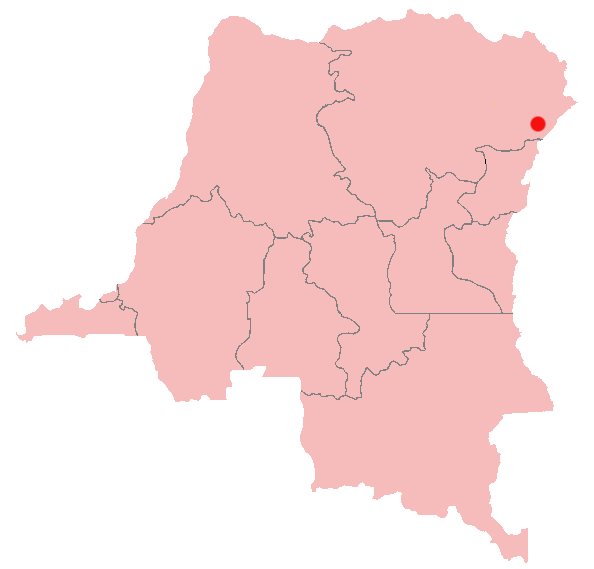
- Location of Bunia in Ituri region of the Democratic Republic of the Congo
- Date: 30 May 2003
- Meeting no.: 4,764
- Code: S/RES/1484 (Document)
- Subject: The situation concerning the Democratic Republic of the Congo
- Voting summary: 15 voted for; None voted against; None abstained
- Result: Adopted

Security Council composition
- Permanent members: China; France; Russia; United Kingdom; United States
- Non-permanent members: Angola; Bulgaria; Chile; Cameroon; Germany; Guinea; Mexico; Pakistan; Spain; Syria

United Nations Security Council Resolution 1484, adopted unanimously on 30 May 2003, after recalling previous resolutions on the situation in the Democratic Republic of the Congo, the Council authorised Operation Artemis in Bunia, the capital of Ituri Province, amid the deteriorating security situation in the area.

As part of the Ituri Conflict Lendu and Hema militias were battling for control of the town after Ugandan troops withdrew after the signing of a peace agreement, and Congolese police fled. During discussions regarding the deployment of an international force, Council diplomats were mindful of a repetition of the Rwandan genocide in 1994. A French-led force was later agreed to.

== Resolution ==
=== Observations ===
The Security Council was determined to promote the Congolese peace process, including the establishment of an inclusive transitional government. There was concern at fighting in the Ituri region in the east of the Democratic Republic of the Congo and the humanitarian situation in the town of Bunia. Furthermore, there was an urgent need for a secure base to allow the interim administration in Ituri to function.

The preamble of the resolution also praised the United Nations Mission in the Democratic Republic of Congo (MONUC) for its efforts to stabilise the situation in Bunia and Ituri, particularly the performance of the Uruguayan contingent (soon to be joined by a Bangladeshi force). It deplored attacks on MONUC and the resulting loss of life. Determining the situation to be a threat to international peace and security in the region, the Council considered requests from the Democratic Republic of the Congo, Ituri parties, Rwanda and Uganda to deploy a multinational force in Bunia.

=== Acts ===
Acting under Chapter VII of the United Nations Charter, the Council authorised the deployment of a temporary multinational force in Bunia to work in close co-ordination with MONUC until 1 September 2003. It was mandated to assist the MONUC contingent already in Bunia; stabilise the security situation; improve the humanitarian situation; protect Bunia Airport and internally displaced persons; and contribute to the protection of the civilian population, United Nations and humanitarian personnel. It stressed the temporary nature of the force in order to allow MONUC's presence to be reinforced in Bunia by mid-August 2003. All states participating in the force were authorised to use all necessary measures to fulfil its mandate.

The international community was called upon to contribute to the multinational force through the provision of personnel, equipment, logistical and financial support. The resolution demanded that the parties to the conflict in the Ituri region immediately end hostilities and strongly condemned deliberate killings of MONUC and humanitarian personnel, reiterating the need for respect of international humanitarian law. Furthermore, the Council demanded that all Congolese parties and states in the Great Lakes region respect human rights, end support for armed groups and militias, and co-operate with the international force and MONUC in Bunia.

== See also ==
- Kivu conflict
- Ituri conflict
- List of United Nations Security Council Resolutions 1401 to 1500 (2002–2003)
- Lusaka Ceasefire Agreement
- Second Congo War
