= United Nations Security Council Resolution 1429 =

UN Security Council Resolution 1429
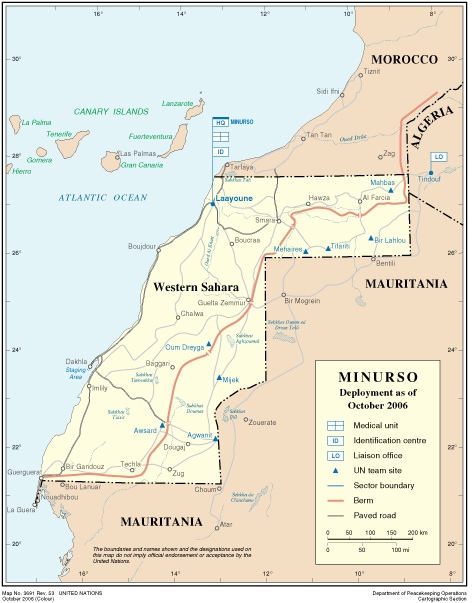
- Western Sahara
- Date: 30 July 2002
- Meeting no.: 4,594
- Code: S/RES/1429 (Document)
- Subject: The situation concerning Western Sahara
- Voting summary: 15 voted for; None voted against; None abstained
- Result: Adopted

Security Council composition
- Permanent members: China; France; Russia; United Kingdom; United States
- Non-permanent members: Bulgaria; Cameroon; Colombia; Guinea; Ireland; Mauritius; Mexico; Norway; Singapore; Syria

United Nations Security Council resolution 1429, adopted unanimously on 30 July 2002, after recalling all previous resolutions on the situation in Western Sahara, particularly resolutions 1359 (2001) and 1394 (2001), the Council extended the mandate of the United Nations Mission for the Referendum in Western Sahara (MINURSO) for six months until 31 January 2003.

== Resolution ==
=== Observations ===
The Security Council was concerned at the lack of progress towards a political solution to the dispute between Morocco and the Polisario Front, which remained a potential source of instability to the Maghreb region. It reaffirmed its commitment to assist the parties in achieving a durable solution which will provide for the self-determination of the people of Western Sahara. The parties were commended for their respect of the ceasefire and MINURSO's efforts were also praised.

=== Acts ===
The Council supported the efforts of the Secretary-General Kofi Annan and his Personal Envoy James Baker III to find a settlement to the long-standing dispute between Morocco and the Polisario Front. Furthermore, the parties and states in the region were asked to co-operate with the Secretary-General and his Personal Envoy.

The resolution welcomed the release of 101 prisoners of war and called upon the Polisario Front to release remaining prisoners under international humanitarian law. Both parties were asked to co-operate with the International Committee of the Red Cross to resolve the issue of persons unaccounted for since the start of the conflict. The parties were also urged to implement confidence-building measures with the United Nations High Commissioner for Refugees (UNHCR) and for the international community to support the UNHCR and World Food Programme in overcoming the deteriorating food situation among refugees.

Finally, the Secretary-General was asked to provide an assessment of the situation and reconfiguration of MINURSO before 31 January 2003.

== See also ==
- Free Zone (region)
- Political status of Western Sahara
- List of United Nations Security Council Resolutions 1401 to 1500 (2002–2003)
- Sahrawi Arab Democratic Republic
- Moroccan Western Sahara Wall
