= United Nations Security Council Resolution 1473 =

UN Security Council Resolution 1473
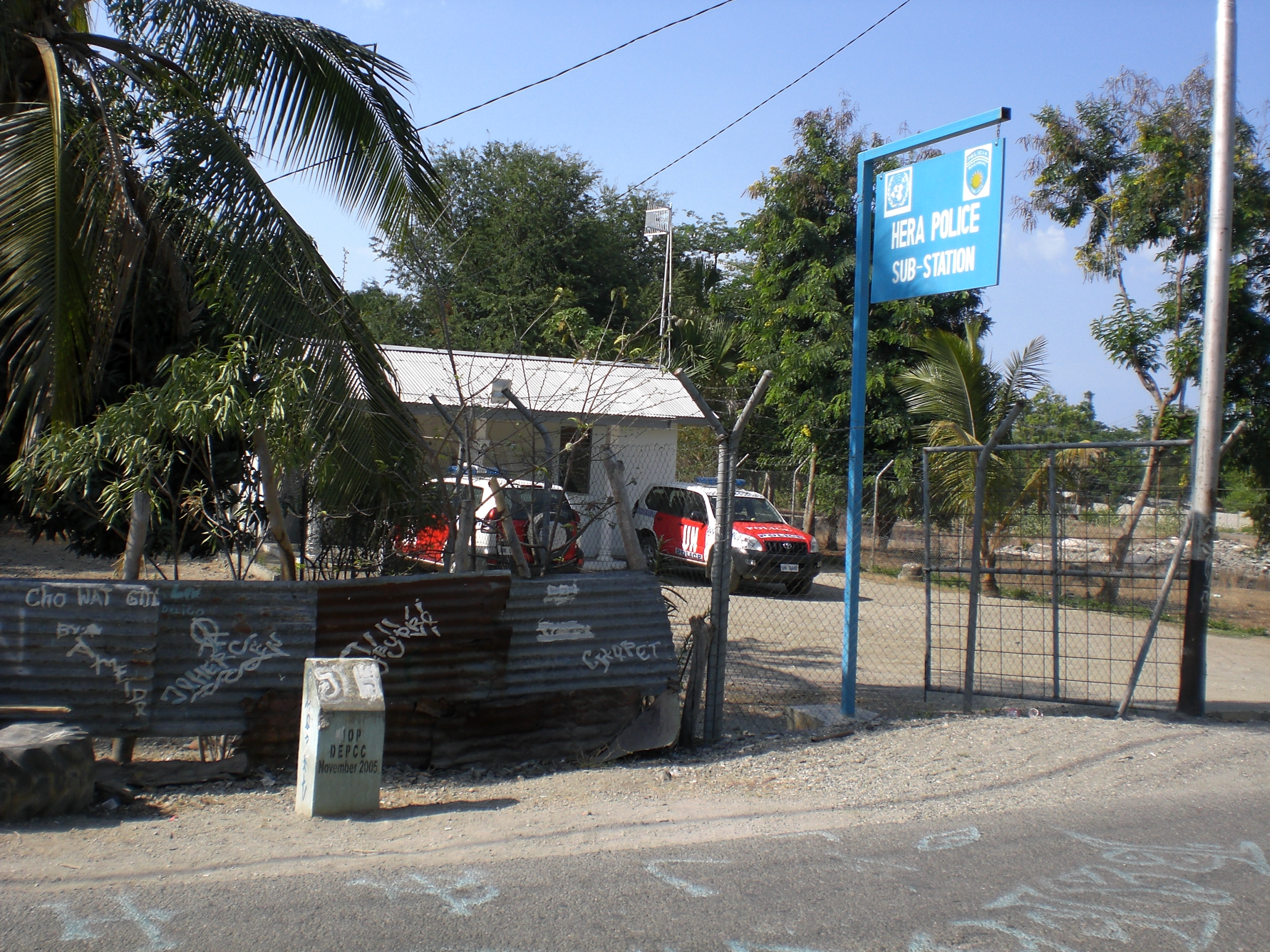
- United Nations police station in East Timor
- Date: 4 April 2003
- Meeting no.: 4,735
- Code: S/RES/1473 (Document)
- Subject: The situation in East Timor
- Voting summary: 15 voted for; None voted against; None abstained
- Result: Adopted

Security Council composition
- Permanent members: China; France; Russia; United Kingdom; United States
- Non-permanent members: Angola; Bulgaria; Chile; Cameroon; Germany; Guinea; Mexico; Pakistan; Spain; Syria

United Nations Security Council resolution 1473, adopted unanimously on 4 April 2003, after recalling previous resolutions on East Timor (Timor-Leste), particularly Resolution 1410 (2002), the Council adjusted the United Nations Mission of Support to East Timor (UNMISET) to improve its capacity to train the National Police of East Timor in light of the security situation, and slowed the downsizing of the operation.

The Security Council welcomed progress East Timor had made with UNMISET assistance, stressing the priority of improving the capabilities of the national police and noting continuing challenges to the country's security and stability. It decided that composition and strength of the UNMISET police component and its downsizing would include the following measures:

(i) inclusion of an international unit for one year;
(ii) provision of additional training capacity in relation to crowd control, border security and tactical operations;
(iii) emphasis on human rights and rule of law;
(iv) retaining a monitoring and advisory presence in areas under the control of the East Timor police;
(v) preparations for the transfer of authority to the East Timor police force.

The resolution decided that the downsizing of the military component of UNMISET until December 2003 would be adjusted so that the number of military peacekeepers would be reduced from 1,750 more slowly than envisaged in Resolution 1410. By January 2004, 325 officers would be still present in the country. Two battalions would also be retained.

The Secretary-General Kofi Annan was requested to report by 20 May 2003 on a revised schedule for the downsizing of UNMISET and to keep the Council informed of developments in East Timor. Finally, the East Timorese government was asked to co-operate with UNMISET in the implementation of police and military strategies.

== See also ==
- 1999 East Timorese crisis
- East Timor Special Autonomy Referendum
- Indonesian occupation of East Timor
- List of United Nations Security Council Resolutions 1401 to 1500 (2002–2003)
- United Nations Transitional Administration in East Timor
