= United Nations Security Council Resolution 1394 =

UN Security Council Resolution 1394
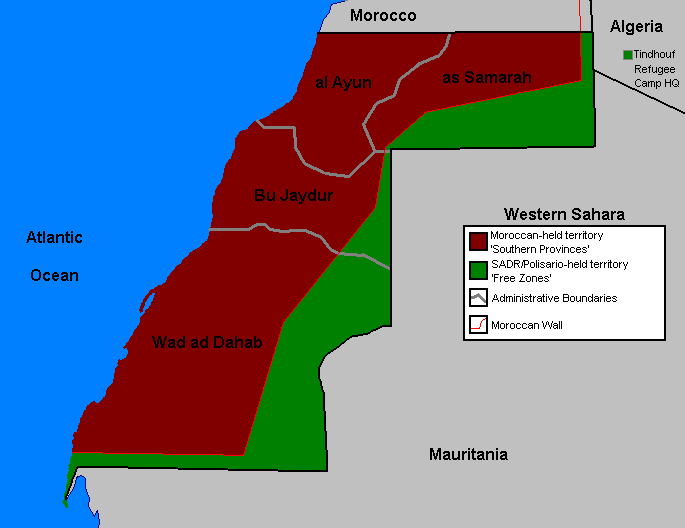
- Areas controlled by Morocco and the Polisario Front in Western Sahara
- Date: 27 February 2002
- Meeting no.: 4,480
- Code: S/RES/1394 (Document)
- Subject: The situation concerning Western Sahara
- Voting summary: 15 voted for; None voted against; None abstained
- Result: Adopted

Security Council composition
- Permanent members: China; France; Russia; United Kingdom; United States
- Non-permanent members: Bulgaria; Cameroon; Colombia; Guinea; Ireland; Mauritius; Mexico; Norway; Singapore; Syria

United Nations Security Council resolution 1394, adopted unanimously on 27 February 2002, after reaffirming all previous resolutions on Western Sahara and its commitment to achieve a lasting solution to the dispute, the Council extended the mandate of the United Nations Mission for the Referendum in Western Sahara (MINURSO) until 30 April 2002.

The Security Council pledged to consider the Secretary-General Kofi Annan's "four options" for the future of the Western Sahara peace process described in his report, noting that both Morocco and Polisario Front had not fully co-operated with the United Nations in the settlement of their dispute. The four options were:

1. The resumption of the implementation of the Settlement Plan without requiring agreements from both parties;
2. The Secretary-General's Personal Envoy James A. Baker III would revise the framework agreement which would be presented to the parties on a non-negotiable basis;
3. The Secretary-General's Personal Envoy James A. Baker III would determine if the parties would discuss a division of Western Sahara;
4. The termination of the MINURSO operation.

== See also ==
- Baker Plan
- Free Zone (region)
- Political status of Western Sahara
- List of United Nations Security Council Resolutions 1301 to 1400 (2000–2002)
- Sahrawi Arab Democratic Republic
- Moroccan Western Sahara Wall
