= United Nations Security Council Resolution 1407 =

UN Security Council Resolution 1407
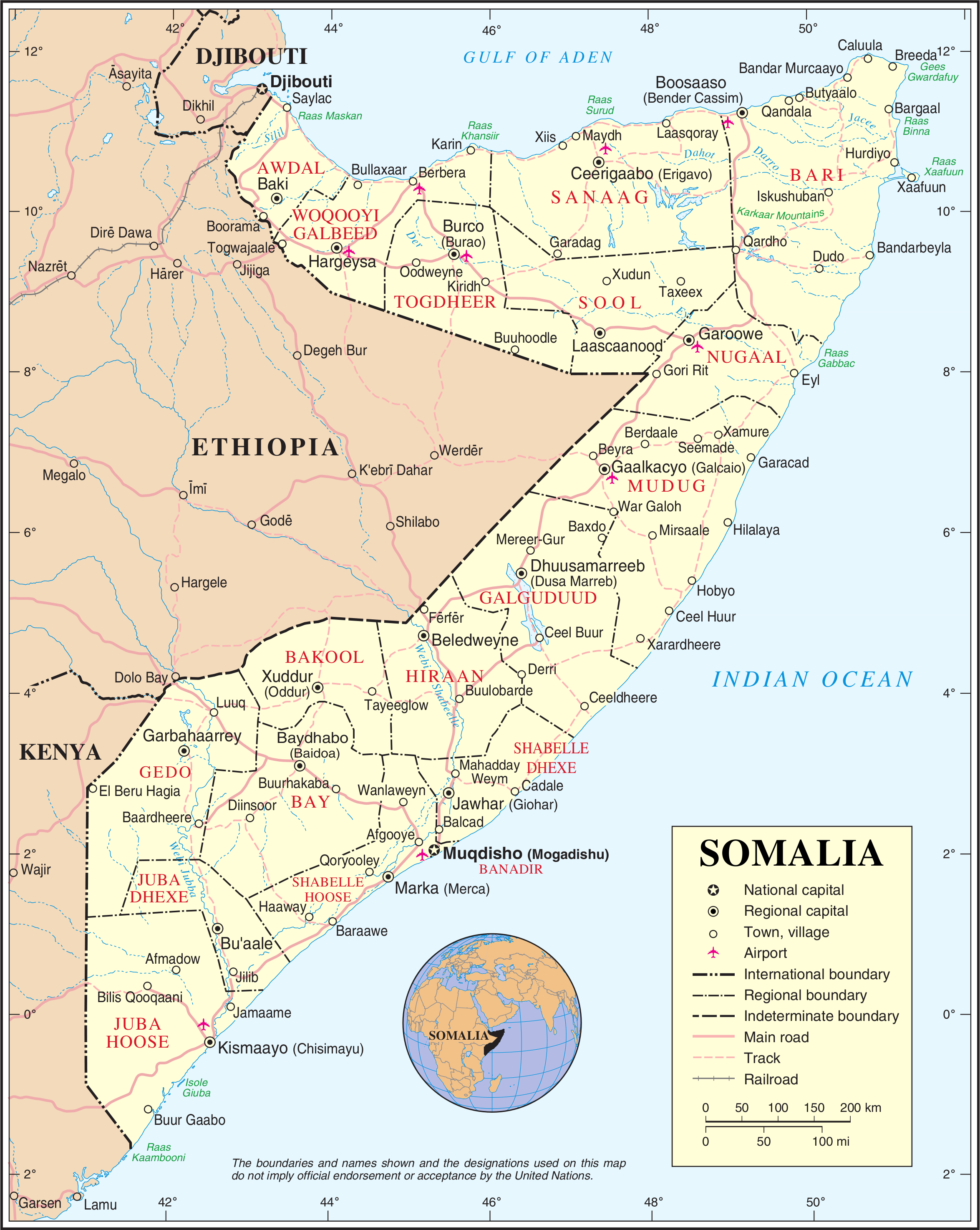
- Somalia
- Date: 3 May 2002
- Meeting no.: 4,524
- Code: S/RES/1407 (Document)
- Subject: The situation in Somalia
- Voting summary: 15 voted for; None voted against; None abstained
- Result: Adopted

Security Council composition
- Permanent members: China; France; Russia; United Kingdom; United States
- Non-permanent members: Bulgaria; Cameroon; Colombia; Guinea; Ireland; Mauritius; Mexico; Norway; Singapore; Syria

United Nations Security Council resolution 1407, adopted unanimously on 3 May 2002, after recalling resolutions on the situation in Somalia, particularly Resolution 733 (1992), the Council requested the Secretary-General to establish a team to assess requirements for an expert panel to monitor violations of the arms embargo against the country.

== Resolution ==
=== Observations ===
The Security Council expressed concern at continued trafficking of arms and ammunition to Somalia from other countries which undermined peace, security and political and national reconciliation efforts in the country. It welcomed a forthcoming visit by the Chairman of the Security Council Committee established in Resolution 751 (1992) to Somalia and his subsequent report.

=== Acts ===
Acting under Chapter VII of the United Nations Charter, the council directed the Secretary-General Kofi Annan to establish a team of two experts for 30 days within one month from the adoption of the current resolution to make preparations for the establishment of an expert panel to provide information on violations of the arms embargo against Somalia and make recommendations.

The council required that the panel investigate violations of the arms embargo by land, air and sea; detail information related to the violations and to enforcement of the embargo; carry out field research in Somalia and other countries; assess the capacity of states in the region to fully implement the arms embargo, including by review of national customs and border control; and to recommend steps to strengthen its enforcement. The chairman was asked to submit the report from the team of experts to the council where its findings would be examined and acted upon by the end of July 2002. It also requested the full co-operation of neighbouring states, the Transitional National Government (TNG) in Somalia and other entities or individuals by providing unhindered access to information for the expert team and Committee Chairman; instances of non-compliance were to be reported to the council.

The resolution further instructed the secretary-general to contribute to the monitoring and enforcement of the arms embargo through co-operation with the TNG, local authorities and civil or religious leaders. All states were asked to provide information on violations of the embargo and were further required to report within 60 days and according to a timetable thereafter on the measures they had taken to implement the arms embargo.

== See also ==
- List of United Nations Security Council Resolutions 1401 to 1500 (2002–2003)
- Somali Civil War
