= Operation Artemis =

2003 European Union military operation in the Democratic Republic of the Congo

- Part of the Second Congo War and the Ituri conflict
- Location of Ituri within the Congo
Date	30 May 2003 – 1 September 2003
Location	Ituri, Democratic Republic of the Congo

Belligerents
Lendu tribe	Hema tribe: Union of Congolese Patriots (UPC)	Democratic Republic of the Congo (United Nations) MONUC (European Union) Artemis

Operation Artemis, formally European Union Force Democratic Republic of the Congo (EUFOR RDC), was a short-term European Union-led UN-authorised military mission to the Democratic Republic of the Congo in 2003, during the Ituri conflict. ARTEMIS is considered the first military operation led by the EU, the first autonomous EU operation, the first rapid response mission of the EU, first operation outside Europe, first operation applying the principle of the framework nation and first example of "relay operation", conducted in cooperation between the EU and the United Nations. The deployment of EUFOR troops quickly decreased the conflict's intensity. It marked the first autonomous EU military mission outside Europe and an important milestone in development of the European Security and Defence Policy.

== Background ==
During the Second Congo War, the Ituri conflict occurred in the Ituri Region alongside Lake Albert and the Ugandan border. The Ituri conflict was fought between two non-governmental informally organised ethnic groups, the Lendu and Hema, that had caused the deaths of thousands of people by 2003.

=== 2003 Ituri conflict fighting ===
In 2003, Lendu and Hema militias were battling for control of the town after Ugandan troops withdrew after the signing of a peace agreement, and Congolese police fled. During discussions regarding the deployment of an international force, UN Security Council diplomats were mindful of a repetition of the Rwandan genocide in 1994. Following a series of massacres, including the Bogoro attack of February 2003, and reports by the United Nations Mission in the Democratic Republic of Congo (MONUC) of serious human rights abuses, the Security Council adopted the Resolution 1484 on 30 May 2003 and authorised the deployment of a French led Interim Multinational Emergency Force (IMEF) to the regional capital of Bunia.

=== UN observer mission and withdrawal of Ugandan troops ===
In the beginning of 2003, the United Nations Mission in the Democratic Republic of Congo (MONUC) observer teams present in that country since 1999, monitored serious combats and human rights violations in Ituri province where the Ituri conflict had been unfolding for the previous four years.

The withdrawal of 7,000 Ugandan troops in April 2003 led to a deteriorating security situation in the Ituri region, endangering the peace process in DRC. In April 2003, 800 Ugandan soldiers were deployed in Bunia and one observer died in a mine explosion. In May 2003, two military observers were killed by a militia.

== Intervention ==
The UN Secretary-General Kofi Annan called for establishing and deploying a temporary multi-national force to the area until the weakened MONUC mission could be reinforced. On 30 May 2003, the Security Council adopted the Resolution 1484 authorising the deployment of an Interim Multinational Emergency Force (IMEF) to Bunia with a task to secure the airport, protect internally displaced persons in camps and the civilians in the town.

The French Government had already shown interest in leading the operation. It soon broadened to an EU-led mission with France as the "Lead nation" providing the bulk of the personnel (900 of the 1400 troops) and complemented by contributions from both EU and non-EU nations. The force was supported by French aircraft based at N'Djamena and Entebbe airfields. A small Swedish Special Forces group (SSG and FJS IK, the latter being an elite specially trained company from the Swedish Parachute Ranger School) was also added.

- Military forces: Belgium, Brazil, Canada, France, Greece, South Africa, Sweden, United Kingdom,
- Headquarters staff: Austria, Cyprus, Hungary, Ireland, Italy, Luxembourg, Netherlands, Portugal, Spain, Germany

Operation Artemis was launched on 12 June and the IMEF completed its deployment in the following three weeks. The force was successful in stabilising the situation in Bunia and enforcing the UN presence in the DRC. On 1 September 2003, responsibility for the security of the region was handed over to the MONUC mission. The number of authorised personnel in the MONUC mission was previously extended in Resolution 1493.

Following the rapid deployment of about 1800 troops to the region in June 2003, Bunia was secured but massacres continued in the countryside. On 1 September 2003, responsibility for the security of the region was handed over to the MONUC mission.

== Milestone ==
By December 2003, one of major warring parties in the region, the Union of Congolese Patriots (UPC) had split and fighting in the region decreased significantly. Artemis was the first autonomous EU military mission outside Europe - an important milestone in development of the European Security and Defence Policy.

== See also ==
- Second Congo War
- Ituri Conflict
- European Union Military Operation in the Democratic Republic of the Congo (2006)

== Bibliography ==
- András István Türke, La géopolitique des premières missions de l`Union européenne en Afrique, Paris : L`Harmattan, 2016 (2)
- Türke, András István, The Operation ARTEMIS in the Democratic Republic of Congo, CERPESC Analyses, 07/AF/02/2008 - 21 January 2008
