= United Nations Security Council Resolution 1410 =

United Nations Security Council resolution

UN Security Council Resolution 1410
- Flag of East Timor
- Date: 17 May 2002
- Meeting no.: 4,534
- Code: S/RES/1410 (Document)
- Subject: The situation in East Timor
- Voting summary: 15 voted for; None voted against; None abstained
- Result: Adopted

Security Council composition
- Permanent members: China; France; Russia; United Kingdom; United States
- Non-permanent members: Bulgaria; Cameroon; Colombia; Guinea; Ireland; Mauritius; Mexico; Norway; Singapore; Syria

United Nations Security Council resolution 1410, adopted unanimously on 17 May 2002, after recalling previous resolutions on East Timor (Timor-Leste), particularly resolutions 1272 (1999), 1338 (2001) and 1392 (2002), the council established the United Nations Mission of Support to East Timor (UNMISET) to replace the United Nations Transitional Administration in East Timor (UNTAET).

== Resolution ==
=== Observations ===
The security council commended the East Timorese people for bringing the territory to the point of independence, and praised the successful holding of parliamentary and presidential elections. It welcomed steps taken by the leaders of East Timor to establish good relations with neighbouring states but noted that institutions in the territory remained fragile and would require assistance.

It welcomed a recommendation from the Secretary-General Kofi Annan to establish a successor mission to UNTAET for 2 years. Furthermore, the council recognised long and short-term challenges to the security and stability of East Timor.

=== Acts ===
UNMISET was established for an initial period of 12 months beginning on 20 May 2002. Its mandate would provide assistance to core administrative structures, interim law enforcement and security, and contribute to the maintenance of the security of East Timor. The operation would be headed by the Special Representative of the Secretary-General and consist of a police component of 1,250 officers and a military component with a strength of up to 5,000 troops including 120 observers. It was requested to give effect to the following programmes:

(a) Stability, democracy and justice;
(b) Public security and law enforcement;
(c) External security and border control.

Progress towards completing the programmes would be kept under review with a reduction in the size of UNMISET taking place as soon as possible. The council further decided that the operation be bound by internationally recognised human rights principles, and that it could take all necessary measures to fulfil its mandate under Chapter VII of the United Nations Charter. Over a period of two years, UNMISET was expected to devolve operational responsibilities to the East Timorese authorities.

The international community was urged to provide assistance during the establishment of the East Timor Police Service and East Timor Defence Force. The resolution called for the conclusion of all agreements and arrangements such as a Status of Forces Agreement to give effect to the mandate of UNMISET. It welcomed progress made between East Timor and Indonesia in resolving issues and stressed the importance of co-operation between the two governments.

Finally, the secretary-general was requested to keep the Council informed on the situation, reporting every six months on the matter.

== See also ==
- 1999 East Timorese crisis
- East Timor Special Autonomy Referendum
- Indonesian occupation of East Timor
- List of United Nations Security Council Resolutions 1401 to 1500 (2002–2003)
- United Nations Mission in East Timor
