= United Nations Security Council Resolution 1341 =

UN Security Council Resolution 1341
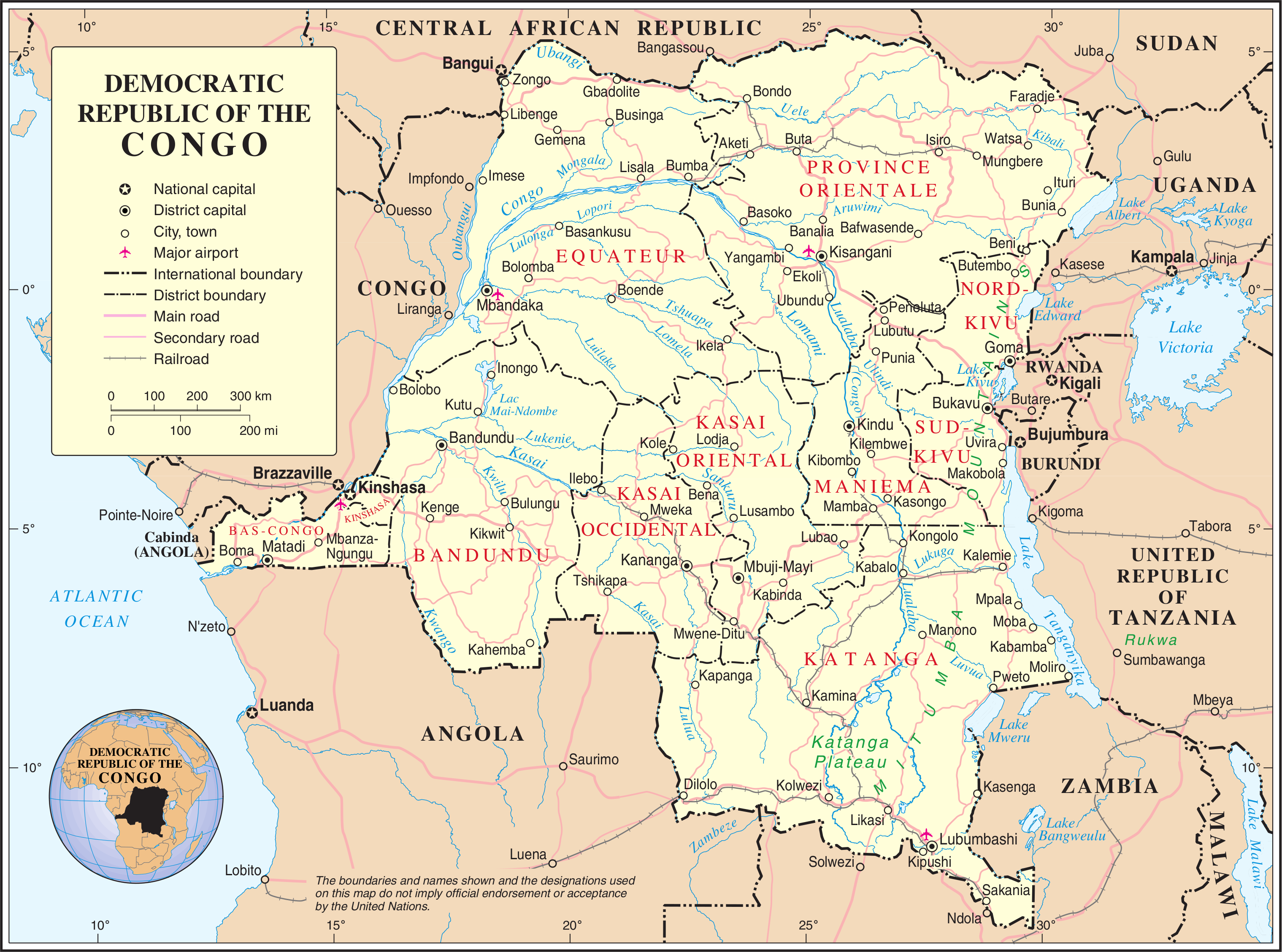
- Democratic Republic of the Congo
- Date: 22 February 2001
- Meeting no.: 4,282
- Code: S/RES/1341 (Document)
- Subject: The situation concerning the Democratic Republic of the Congo
- Voting summary: 15 voted for; None voted against; None abstained
- Result: Adopted

Security Council composition
- Permanent members: China; France; Russia; United Kingdom; United States
- Non-permanent members: Bangladesh; Colombia; Ireland; Jamaica; Mali; Mauritius; Norway; Singapore; Tunisia; Ukraine

United Nations Security Council resolution 1341, adopted unanimously on 22 February 2001, after recalling resolutions 1234 (1999), 1258 (1999), 1265 (1999), 1273 (1999), 1279 (1999), 1291 (2000), 1296 (2000), 1304 (2000), 1323 (2000) and 1332 (2000) on situation in the Democratic Republic of the Congo, the Council demanded that all parties to the conflict in the country implement disengagement plans and adopt withdrawal plans for foreign troops by 15 May 2001.

== Resolution ==
=== Observations ===
In the preamble of Resolution 1341, the Security Council expressed concern about the consequences of the illegal exploitation of the Democratic Republic of the Congo's natural resources on the security situation and continuation of hostilities. The conflict had a severe impact on the civilian population and caused the number of refugees to increase. It was concerned at violations of human rights particularly in the east of the country, violence against the population, the spread of HIV/AIDS among women and girls and the use of child soldiers.

The Council stressed the importance of forwarding the peace process called for in the Lusaka Ceasefire Agreement.

=== Acts ===
Acting under Chapter VII of the United Nations Charter, the resolution noted that there was progress in respecting the ceasefire and all parties were called upon to cease hostilities. It demanded that Rwandan and Ugandan forces immediately withdraw from the Democratic Republic of the Congo and for all parties to implement plans for disengagement and the redeployment of forces. Parties to the Lusaka Ceasefire Agreement were urged to adopt plans for the withdrawal of all foreign troops and disarmament, demobilisation and reintegration, repatriation or resettlement of armed groups by 15 May 2001, and to refrain from any military action during this process.

All massacres committed in the Democratic Republic of the Congo were condemned and an end to the practice of recruiting child soldiers was called for. The concerned parties were urged to respect human rights, ensure safe and unimpeded access to humanitarian relief organisations and guarantee their freedom of movement. The Council recalled the Fourth Geneva Convention regarding the protection of civilians in armed conflict with respect to occupying forces.

The resolution called for all parties to co-operate with the United Nations Mission in the Democratic Republic of the Congo (MONUC) to further develop the dialogue between the parties. It reaffirmed the expansion and redeployment of the MONUC operation and emphasised a further review would be considered to monitor the withdrawal of foreign troops, the implementation of the aforementioned plans and enhance security of the border areas with Rwanda, Uganda and Burundi. The council would support the Secretary-General Kofi Annan if he decided to deploy troops in the border areas, particularly Goma and Bukavu.

The council welcomed the commitment of the government of Joseph Kabila to resume inter-Congolese dialogue, dialogue between the Democratic Republic of the Congo and Burundi and recent meetings between the presidents of Rwanda and the Democratic Republic of the Congo, noting that the disarmament of the former Rwandan Armed Forces and Interahamwe would facilitate the settlement of the conflict. It was important that the illegal exploitation of the natural resources was ended. Further measures would be considered and a mission to the region was to take place, possibly in May 2001.

== See also ==
- List of United Nations Security Council Resolutions 1301 to 1400 (2000–2002)
- Second Congo War
