= United Nations Security Council Resolution 1355 =

UN Security Council Resolution 1355
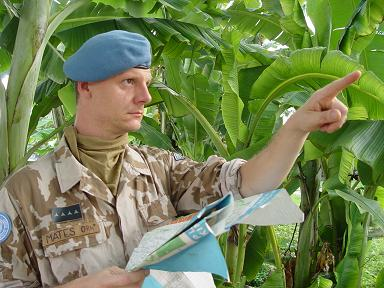
- MONUC peacekeeper in the Democratic Republic of the Congo
- Date: 15 June 2001
- Meeting no.: 4,329
- Code: S/RES/1355 (Document)
- Subject: The situation concerning the Democratic Republic of the Congo
- Voting summary: 15 voted for; None voted against; None abstained
- Result: Adopted

Security Council composition
- Permanent members: China; France; Russia; United Kingdom; United States
- Non-permanent members: Bangladesh; Colombia; Ireland; Jamaica; Mali; Mauritius; Norway; Singapore; Tunisia; Ukraine

United Nations Security Council resolution 1355, adopted unanimously on 15 June 2001, after recalling resolutions 1234 (1999), 1258 (1999), 1265 (1999), 1273 (1999), 1279 (1999), 1291 (2000), 1296 (2000), 1304 (2000), 1323 (2000), 1332 (2000) and 1341 (2001) on situation in the Democratic Republic of the Congo, the Council extended the mandate of the United Nations Mission in the Democratic Republic of Congo (MONUC) until 15 June 2002 subject to review every four months.

== Resolution ==
=== Observations ===
The preamble of the resolution expressed concern at the humanitarian consequences of the conflict in the Democratic Republic of Congo, and at all violations of human rights against the population, particularly in the east of the country. There was also concern at the use of child soldiers. It also reaffirmed the Lusaka Ceasefire Agreement and other redeployment and disengagement plans. It concluded by determining that the situation in the region constituted a threat to international peace and security in the region.

=== Acts ===
==== A ====
Acting under Chapter VII of the United Nations Charter, the Council expressed satisfaction that there was general observance of the ceasefire. It demanded that the Front de Libération du Congo disengage and redeploy in accordance with previously agreed plans and commitments made to the Security Council mission that visited the region. The Council again demanded that Ugandan, Rwandan and other foreign forces immediately withdraw from the Democratic Republic of the Congo. There was concern that military operations had taken place in the Kivus and the Rally for Congolese Democracy was urged to demilitarise Kisangani. All parties, including the Government of the Democratic Republic of the Congo, had to cease support for armed groups. Meanwhile, incursions by armed groups into Rwanda and Burundi were condemned.

The Security Council, highlighting diplomatic efforts to resolve the crisis, welcomed dialogue between the Democratic Republic of the Congo and Burundi and stressed that peace in the former should not be achieved at the expense of peace in the latter. Dialogue among Congolese parties was also welcomed. It condemned massacres, the use of child soldiers and attacks on humanitarian personnel and reminded parties of their obligations under the Fourth Geneva Convention. The international community was called upon to increase humanitarian aid to the region.

The resolution stressed that the illegal exploitation of the country's natural resources had to end and it awaited a report from a panel established to investigate the matter. It stressed the importance of the link between progress in the peace process and economic recovery and welcomed the re-opening of the Congo and Ubangi Rivers and the establishment of the Congo River Basin Commission to address river traffic. The Council noted that peace would only be achieved if all countries in the region defined rules to promote security and development.

==== B ====
The Security Council extended MONUC's mandate and requested the Secretary-General Kofi Annan to make recommendations on ways MONUC could monitor the implementation of withdrawal plans. It authorised the MONUC mission to assist in the disarmament, demobilisation, rehabilitation and reintegration process involving armed groups. The Secretary-General was further requested to expand the civilian component of MONUC, particularly in the area of human rights and international humanitarian law.

The resolution approved the Secretary-General's revised concept of operations for MONUC, which included the creation of a civilian police component. It noted the need to improve the public information capacity through the establishment of United Nations radio stations. Finally, the parties were called upon to co-operate fully with the UNMOC mission and ensure the safety of United Nations personnel.

== See also ==
- List of United Nations Security Council Resolutions 1301 to 1400 (2000–2002)
- Second Congo War
