= United Nations Security Council Resolution 1457 =

UN Security Council Resolution 1457
- Date: 24 January 2003
- Meeting no.: 4,691
- Code: S/RES/1457 (Document)
- Subject: The situation concerning the Democratic Republic of the Congo
- Voting summary: 15 voted for; None voted against; None abstained
- Result: Adopted

Security Council composition
- Permanent members: China; France; Russia; United Kingdom; United States
- Non-permanent members: Angola; Bulgaria; Chile; Cameroon; Germany; Guinea; Mexico; Pakistan; Spain; Syria

United Nations Security Council resolution 1457, adopted unanimously on 24 January 2003, after recalling resolutions 1291 (2000), 1304 (2000), 1323 (2000), 1332 (2000), 1341 (2001), 1355 (2001), 1376 (2001), 1417 (2002) and 1445 (2002) on the situation in the Democratic Republic of the Congo, the council condemned the plundering of natural resources in the country and requested a six-month mandate for a panel investigating the issue.

== Resolution ==
=== Observations ===
The Security Council reaffirmed the sovereignty and territorial integrity of the Democratic Republic of the Congo and other states in the region, and particularly its sovereignty of natural resources on its territory. It reiterated its commitment to put an end to the plundering of resources in the country in support of the peace process. The situation in the country continued to constitute a threat to international peace and security in the African Great Lakes region.

=== Acts ===
There was a report from the expert panel that investigated illegal exploitation of the Democratic Republic of the Congo's natural resources. It condemned the exploitation of natural resources as a major factor fuelling the conflict in the region, and all states were called upon to end the illegal activities. The Council stressed that the complete withdrawal of foreign troops and the establishment of an inclusive transitional government were important steps in ending the plundering of the country's natural resources.

The resolution recognised the importance of natural resources for the future of the Democratic Republic of the Congo and urged international financial institutions and organisations to establish structures to control resource exploitation. The relationship between the illegal plundering of natural resources and the continuation of the conflict warranted further investigation, and therefore the Secretary-General Kofi Annan was requested to give an investigative panel a six-month mandate to further examine the issue and make recommendations. Individuals, companies and countries were invited to respond to the previous investigative report by 31 March 2003 and for the reactions to be published upon request.

Finally, countries were encouraged to conduct their own investigations into the findings of the expert panel and action taken in this regard by the Democratic Republic of the Congo, Rwanda, Uganda and Zimbabwe was welcomed by the council.

== See also ==
- Kivu conflict
- Ituri conflict
- List of United Nations Security Council Resolutions 1401 to 1500 (2002–2003)
- Lusaka Ceasefire Agreement
- Second Congo War
