= United Nations Security Council Resolution 1332 =

UN Security Council Resolution 1332
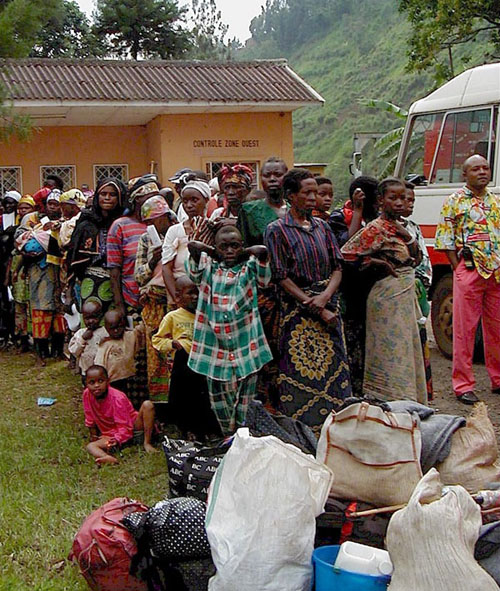
- Refugees in the Democratic Republic of the Congo near the border with Rwanda
- Date: 14 December 2000
- Meeting no.: 4,247
- Code: S/RES/1332 (Document)
- Subject: The situation concerning the Democratic Republic of the Congo
- Voting summary: 15 voted for; None voted against; None abstained
- Result: Adopted

Security Council composition
- Permanent members: China; France; Russia; United Kingdom; United States
- Non-permanent members: Argentina; Bangladesh; Canada; Jamaica; Malaysia; Mali; Namibia; Netherlands; Tunisia; Ukraine

United Nations Security Council resolution 1332, adopted unanimously on 14 December 2000, after recalling resolutions 1234 (1999), 1258 (1999), 1265 (1999), 1273 (1999), 1279 (1999), 1291 (2000), 1296 (2000), 1304 (2000) and 1323 (2000) on situation in the Democratic Republic of the Congo, the Council extended the mandate of the United Nations Mission in the Democratic Republic of Congo (MONUC) until 15 June 2001.

The Security Council deplored the numerous violations of the ceasefire, continuing hostilities and lack of dialogue. There were agreements reached to stop the fighting and the country had to support the MONUC mission. The humanitarian situation in the Democratic Republic of the Congo and the serious consequences of the conflict on neighbouring countries concerned the council. There was also concern about the rapid spread of HIV/AIDS among women and girls by the conflict, the deployment of child soldiers and difficulty assisting refugees.

All parties to Lusaka Ceasefire Agreement were asked to cease hostilities and intensify negotiations. The Democratic Republic of the Congo was asked to co-operate with MONUC and implement the provisions of the Status of Forces Agreement. The resolution endorsed the proposal of the Secretary-General Kofi Annan to send additional military observers to the region, and he was called upon to submit a report on ways to address the situation in border areas near Uganda, Rwanda and Burundi.

It called for the withdrawal of Rwandan and Ugandan forces and other foreign troops from the country. Furthermore, all parties were called upon to respect human rights and to ensure that no more child soldiers were used in the armed conflict. The council also called on all parties to take forward the disarmament, demobilisation, reintegration and repatriation/settlement of all armed groups, in particular the National Council for the Defense of Democracy-Forces for the Defense of Democracy (FDD), the Rwandan ex-FAR/Interahamwe and the Allied Democratic Forces (ADF).

Finally, the parties were invited to co-operate with the panel of experts to investigate the illegal exploitation of Congolese natural resources. The adoption of the Resolution 1332 led to the return of 165 Congolese children to the United Nations Children's Fund (UNICEF).

== See also ==
- List of United Nations Security Council Resolutions 1301 to 1400 (2000–2002)
- Lusaka Ceasefire Agreement
- Second Congo War
