= United Nations Security Council Resolution 1998 =

UN Security Council Resolution 1998
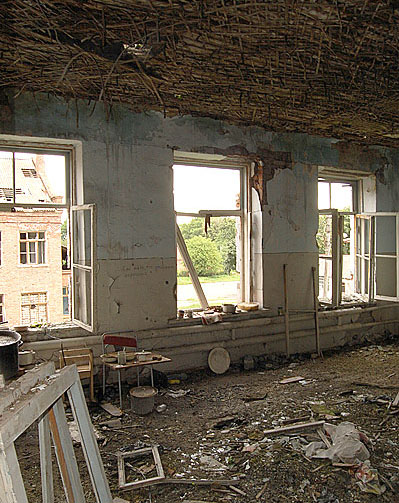
- Ruins of School Number One after the Beslan school hostage crisis
- Date: 12 July 2011
- Meeting no.: 6,581
- Code: S/RES/1998 (Document)
- Subject: Children and armed conflict
- Voting summary: 15 voted for; None voted against; None abstained
- Result: Adopted

Security Council composition
- Permanent members: China; France; Russia; United Kingdom; United States
- Non-permanent members: Bosnia–Herzegovina; Brazil; Colombia; Germany; Gabon; India; Lebanon; Nigeria; Portugal; South Africa

United Nations Security Council Resolution 1998, adopted unanimously on July 12, 2011, after reaffirming resolutions 1261 (1999), 1314 (2000), 1379 (2001), 1460 (2003), 1539 (2004), 1612 (2005) and 1882 (2009) on the protection of children in armed conflict, the Council declared schools and hospitals off limits for both armed groups and military activities, asking the Secretary-General for such crimes to be placed on a list of those committing "grave violations" against children.

The resolution, sponsored by Germany, was the eighth resolution concerning children and armed conflict passed since 1998.

== Resolution ==
=== Observations ===
In the preamble of the resolution, the Security Council recalled its commitment to international peace and security, including the impact of conflict on children. All parties to conflict were called upon to comply with international law concerning the protection of civilians in armed conflict, such as the Geneva Conventions and the Convention on the Rights of the Child. The Council acknowledged progress made since the implementation of resolution 1612 and 1882, and stressed the responsibility of national governments to protect and provide relief to children affected by armed conflict.

Council members viewed the protection of children in armed conflict as important to a comprehensive strategy to resolve conflict. There was a need to end impunity and those that perpetrated violent acts against children, and there were provisions in the statute of the International Criminal Court.

The text of Resolution 1998 expressed concern about attacks and the threat of attacks on schools and/or hospitals, including attacks on personnel in relation to them and the closure of the institutions in times of conflict and threat of attack.

=== Acts ===
The Security Council strongly condemned all violations of international law involving the recruitment of children by parties to armed conflict, as well as sexual violence, rape, abduction, killing, attacks against schools or hospitals and the denial of humanitarian access to children. The Secretary-General was asked to include information on attacks against schools or hospitals and protected persons in his reports, along with a specific aspect of the report dedicated to the matter of children in armed conflict.

The resolution urged parties to armed conflict to refrain from actions that would prevent children from gaining access to education or health services; in this regard, the Secretary-General was to monitor and report on the illegal military use of schools. Noting that some parties to armed conflict had prepared plans to end the use of children in conflict, those that had not done so were urged to fulfil their obligations and prepare time-bound plans to end illegal practises.

The council was determined to ensure respect for its resolutions on children in armed conflict. All states were asked to take action against persistent perpetrators of violations of international law concerning children in situations of armed conflict. Meanwhile, the United Nations would include provisions for the protection of children in its peacekeeping, peacebuilding and political missions.

Finally, the Secretary-General Ban Ki-moon was asked to report by June 2012 on the implementation of Resolution 1998.

== See also ==
- Laws of war
- List of United Nations Security Council Resolutions 1901 to 2000 (2009–2011)
- List of ongoing military conflicts
- Military use of children
