= United Nations Security Council Resolution 1612 =

UN Security Council Resolution 1612
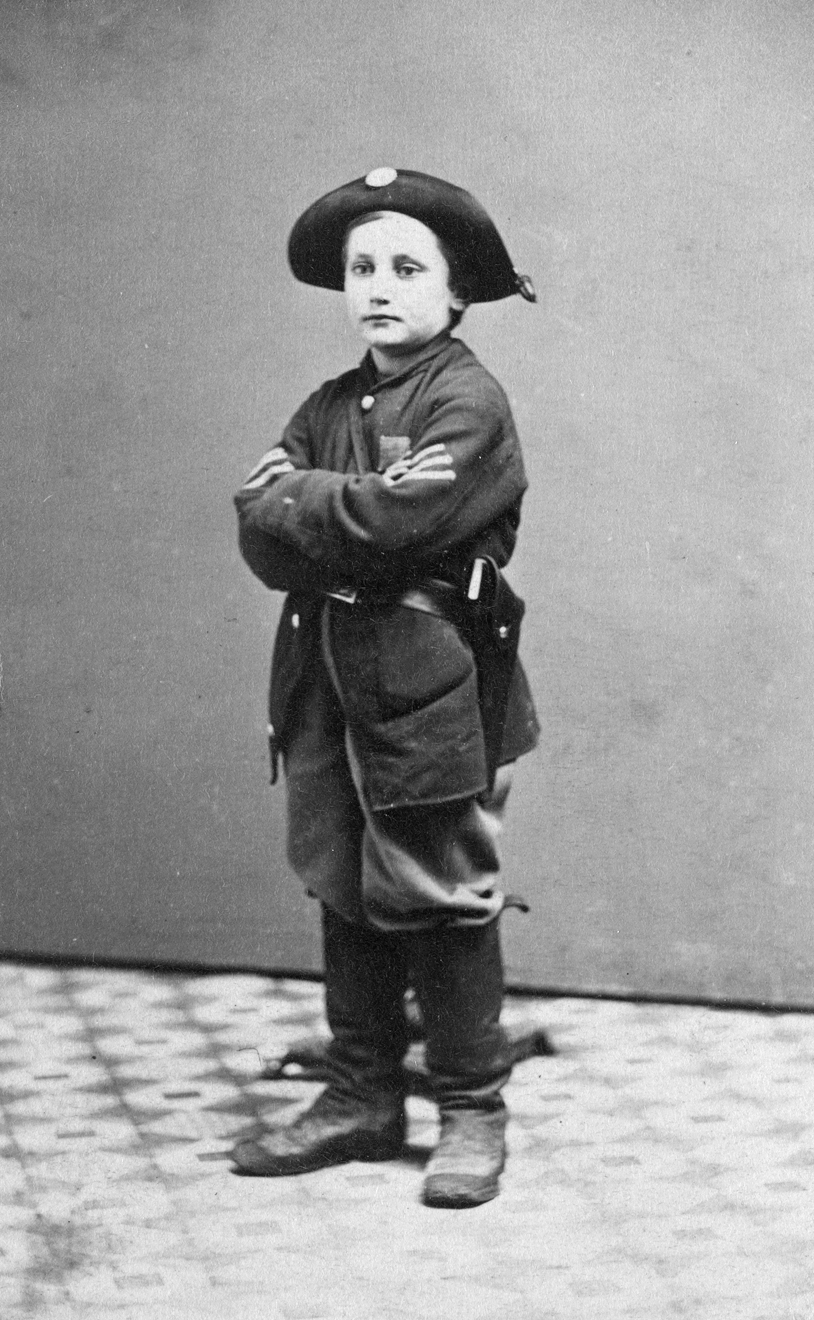
- Child soldiers, Drummer boy John Clem during the American Civil War.
- Date: 26 July 2005
- Meeting no.: 5,235
- Code: S/RES/1612 (Document)
- Subject: Children and armed conflict
- Voting summary: 15 voted for; None voted against; None abstained
- Result: Adopted

Security Council composition
- Permanent members: China; France; Russia; United Kingdom; United States
- Non-permanent members: Algeria; Argentina; Benin; Brazil; Denmark; Greece; Japan; Philippines; Romania; Tanzania

United Nations Security Council Resolution 1612, adopted unanimously on 26 July 2005, after recalling resolutions 1261 (1999), 1308 (2000), 1314 (2000), 1325 (2000), 1379 (2001), 1460 (2003) and 1539 (2004), the council established a monitoring and reporting mechanism on the use of child soldiers.

More than 50 governments and rebel groups would be monitored after the passing of the resolution.

== Resolution ==
=== Observations ===
In the preamble of the resolution, the security council recognised progress in developing guidelines to protect children in armed conflict, but in practice, their rights were still violated with impunity and there was lack of progress on the ground. Furthermore, it highlighted connections between the use of children and illicit arms trafficking.

=== Acts ===
As with previous resolutions on the topic, the council condemned the use and recruitment of child soldiers. The Secretary-General Kofi Annan was asked to implement the following mechanism of reporting and monitoring children in armed conflict:

(a) gather information on the recruitment of child soldiers and the abuse of children;
(b) collaborate with relevant authorities and United Nations agencies;
(c) strengthen the protective role of governments;
(d) dialogues with armed groups as part of a peace process.

A working group was also established to monitor the reports of the mechanism and make recommendations.

The security council noted the lack of progress in implementing Resolution 1539 and expressed its intention to impose sanctions against countries which violate international law relating to children in armed conflict and are also on the agenda of the security council. It was the responsibility of the country teams of the United Nations to conduct follow-up work on Security Council resolutions.

== See also ==
- List of international instruments relevant to the worst forms of child labour
- List of United Nations Security Council Resolutions 1601 to 1700 (2005–2006)
