= United Nations Security Council Resolution 1539 =

UN Security Council Resolution 1539
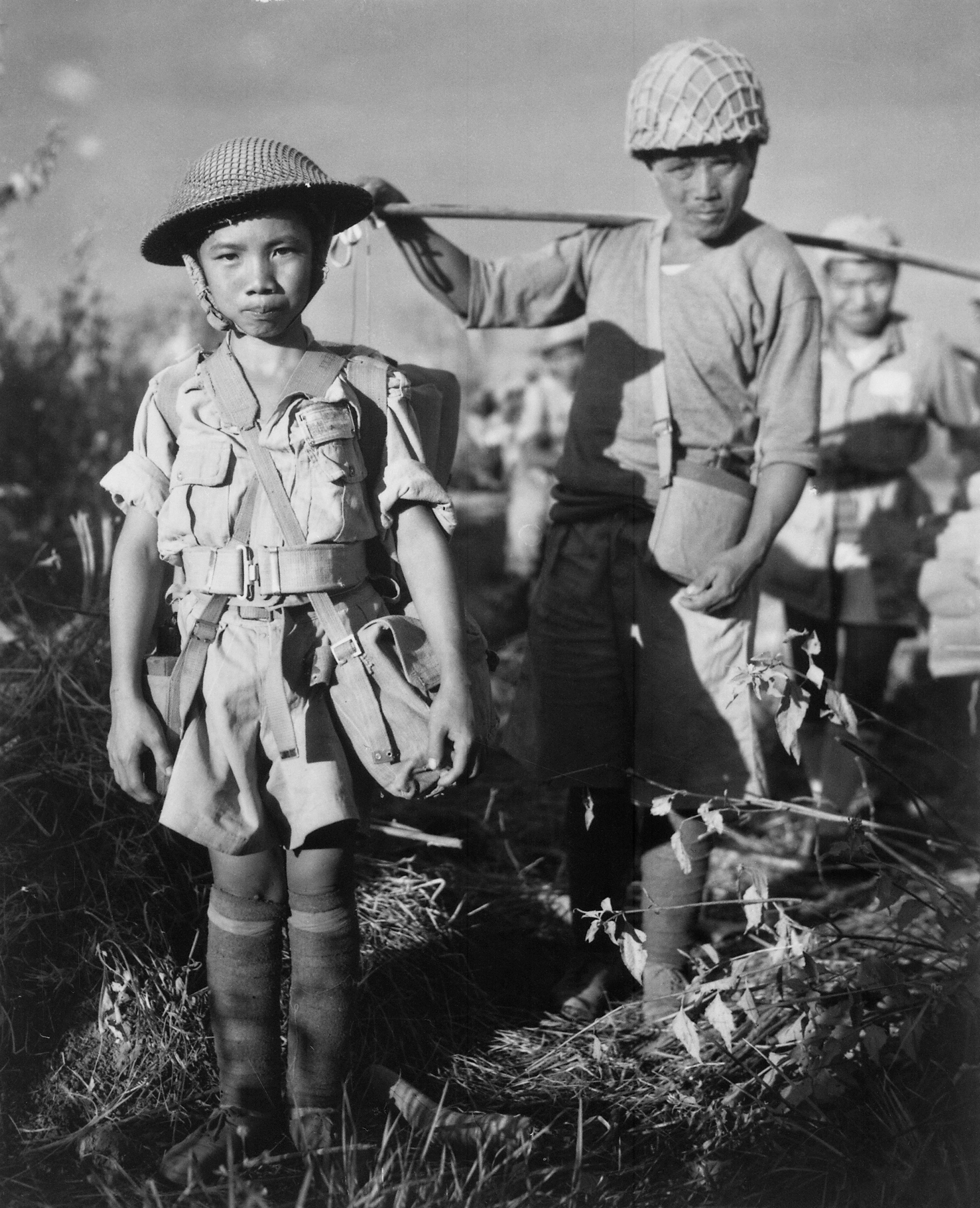
- Chinese child soldier in Burma
- Date: 22 April 2004
- Meeting no.: 4,948
- Code: S/RES/1539 (Document)
- Subject: Children and armed conflict
- Voting summary: 15 voted for; None voted against; None abstained
- Result: Adopted

Security Council composition
- Permanent members: China; France; Russia; United Kingdom; United States
- Non-permanent members: Algeria; Angola; Benin; Brazil; Chile; Germany; Pakistan; Philippines; Romania; Spain

United Nations Security Council resolution 1539, adopted unanimously on 22 April 2004, after recalling resolutions 1261 (1999), 1308 (2000), 1314 (2000), 1325 (2000), 1379 (2001) and 1460 (2003), the council condemned the use of child soldiers and asked the Secretary-General to devise a monitoring mechanism.

The resolution marked the first time the council had broadened the protection framework by identifying other categories of violations against children.

== Resolution ==
=== Observations ===
The security council remained concerned over the lack of progress towards the protection of children affected by armed conflict, though noted some advances in the areas of advocacy and norms and standards. It called on states to end impunity and to prosecute those responsible for genocide, crimes against humanity, war crimes and others. The council reiterated its commitment to address the impact of conflict on children and emphasised the importance of unimpeded access to children affected by armed conflict. Furthermore, it noted that enlisting children under the age of 15 into the national armed forces was classified as a war crime under the Rome Statute of the International Criminal Court, and that the Optional Protocol to the Convention on the Rights of the Child required a minimum age of 18 to be set for compulsory recruitment in hostilities.

The preamble of the resolution also stressed the council's determination to ensure respect for international standards for the protection of children.

=== Acts ===
The resolution began by condemning the use and recruitment of child soldiers, the killing and maiming of children, rape, sexual violence, abduction, forced displacement, denial of humanitarian access, attacks against schools and hospitals, child trafficking, forced labour and slavery. The Secretary-General Kofi Annan was asked to devise a comprehensive monitoring mechanism within three months on the recruitment and use of child soldiers and abuses committed against children. At the same time, the council expressed its intention to consider further measures to end the link between the illegal trade of resources, arms trafficking, cross-border abduction, recruitment and armed conflict. All concerned parties were urged to respect international obligations applicable to them.

The council was concerned at the continued recruitment of child soldiers by certain parties and called upon the parties to have plans ready in three months to end the use and recruitment of child soldiers, requested the secretary-general to regularly review their compliance and expressed the intention to impose further measures against parties or countries that had not co-operated, such as arms embargoes. Meanwhile, it was decided to keep provisions specifically relating to the protection of children in the mandates of peacekeeping operations, including the deployment of child protection advisers. Such provisions for children would also be included in disarmament, demobilisation and reintegration programmes, and the council emphasised that education would play an important role in the prevention of the recruitment of children in armed conflict.

Furthermore, the resolution requested the United Nations to implement HIV/AIDS education, testing and counselling services. It welcomed arrangements by regional and subregional organisations such as the European Union and Economic Community of West African States (ECOWAS) for the protection of children, encouraging the mainstreaming of such policies through advocacy, policies and programmes, developing monitoring mechanisms, establishing child protection mechanisms and the inclusion of child protection staff. The council encouraged the strengthening of regional and local institutions.

Finally, the secretary-general was urged to ensure that the protection of children was given consideration in his future reports to the council, and was requested to report by 31 October 2004 on the implementation of resolutions 1379 and 1460, including progress on a monitoring mechanism.

== See also ==
- List of international instruments relevant to the worst forms of child labour
- List of United Nations Security Council Resolutions 1501 to 1600 (2003–2005)
