= United Nations Security Council Resolution 1316 =

UN Security Council Resolution 1316
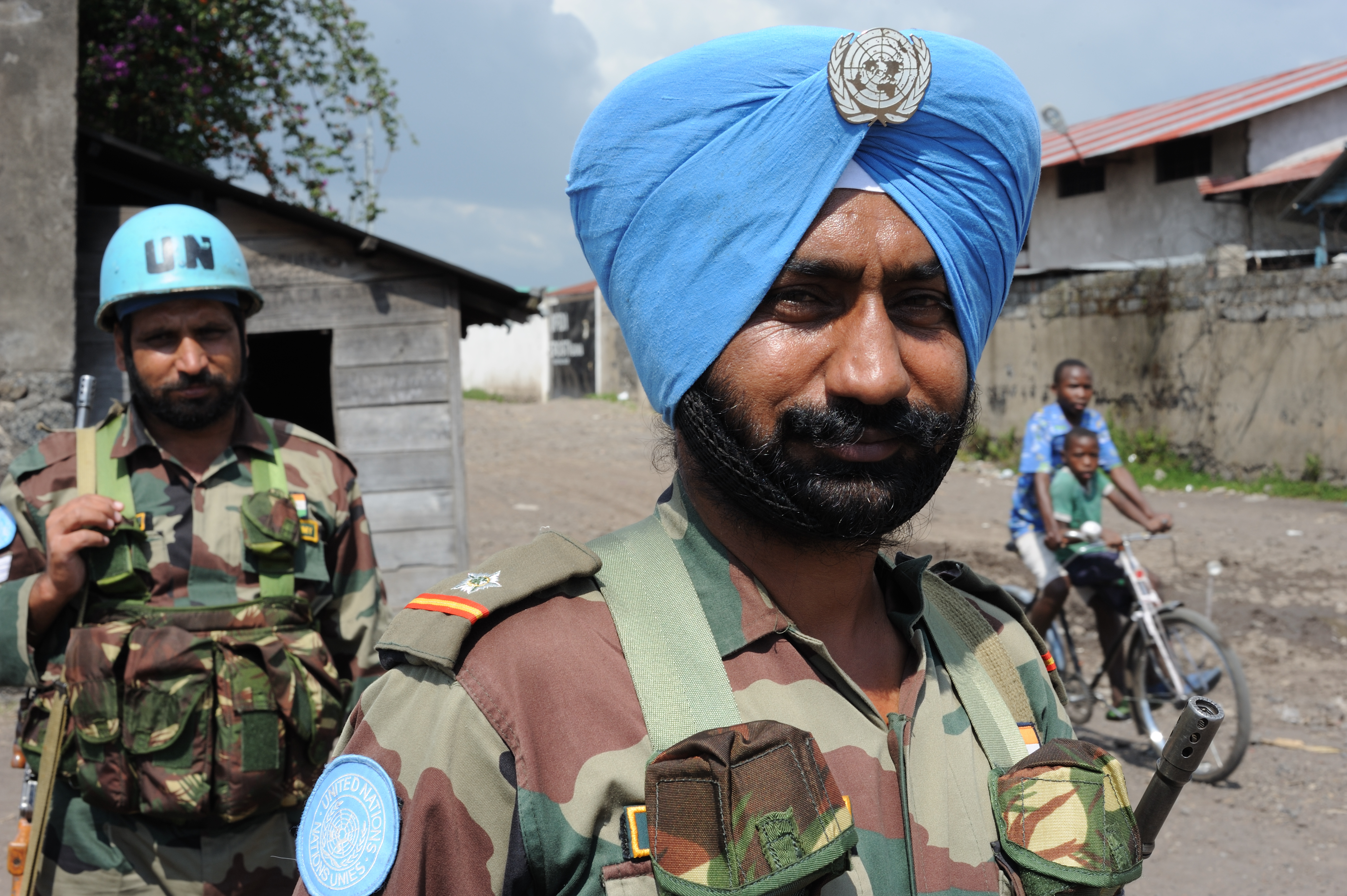
- MONUC peacekeepers
- Date: 23 August 2000
- Meeting no.: 4,189
- Code: S/RES/1316 (Document)
- Subject: The situation concerning the Democratic Republic of the Congo
- Voting summary: 15 voted for; None voted against; None abstained
- Result: Adopted

Security Council composition
- Permanent members: China; France; Russia; United Kingdom; United States
- Non-permanent members: Argentina; Bangladesh; Canada; Jamaica; Malaysia; Mali; Namibia; Netherlands; Tunisia; Ukraine

United Nations Security Council resolution 1316, adopted unanimously on 23 August 2000, after recalling resolutions 1273 (1999), 1291 (2000) and 1304 (2000) on situation in the Democratic Republic of the Congo, the Council extended the mandate of the United Nations Mission in the Democratic Republic of Congo (MONUC) until 15 October 2000.

The resolution noted with concern that MONUC was unable to carry out its full mandate due to lack of access, co-operation and security conditions. The council would work with parties to the Lusaka Ceasefire Agreement to create conditions necessary for MONUC's deployment. The Government of the Democratic Republic of the Congo was called upon to lift all obstacles to its deployment.

The mandate of MONUC was extended to allow time for further diplomatic efforts and reflection on the future mandate of the operation and any necessary adjustments. The Secretary-General Kofi Annan was required to make recommendations on further action to be taken by the Security Council and on the implementation of the Ceasefire Agreement by 21 September 2000.

== See also ==
- List of United Nations Security Council Resolutions 1301 to 1400 (2000–2002)
- Second Congo War
