= United Nations Security Council Resolution 1460 =

United Nations Security Council resolution

UN Security Council Resolution 1460
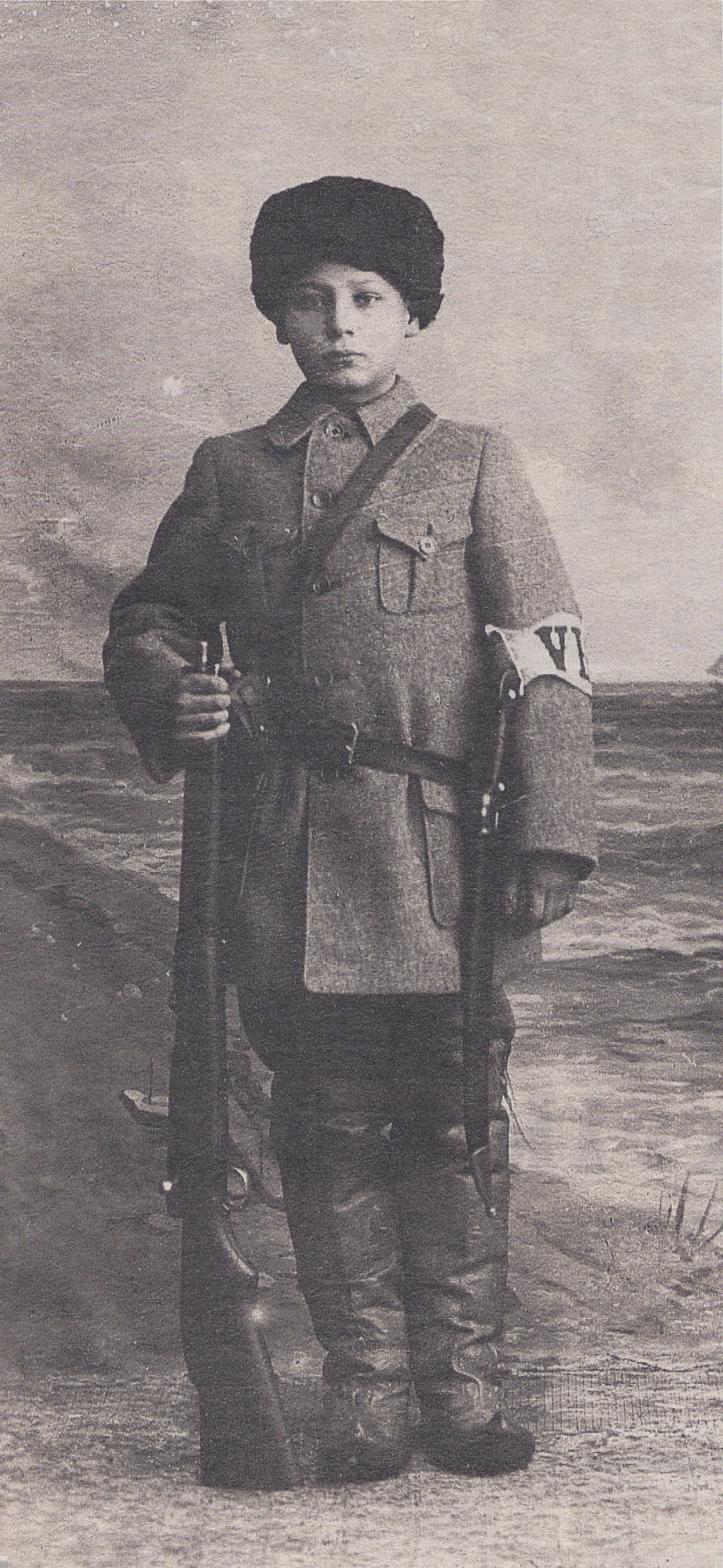
- Child soldier from the Finnish Civil War
- Date: 30 January 2003
- Meeting no.: 4,695
- Code: S/RES/1460 (Document)
- Subject: Children and armed conflict
- Voting summary: 15 voted for; None voted against; None abstained
- Result: Adopted

Security Council composition
- Permanent members: China; France; Russia; United Kingdom; United States
- Non-permanent members: Angola; Bulgaria; Chile; Cameroon; Germany; Guinea; Mexico; Pakistan; Spain; Syria

United Nations Security Council resolution 1460, adopted unanimously on 30 January 2003, after recalling resolutions 1261 (1999), 1265 (1999), 1296 (2000), 1306 (2000), 1308 (2000), 1314 (2000), 1325 (2000) and 1379 (2001), the council called for the immediate end to the use of child soldiers and endorsed an "era of application" of international norms and standards for the protection of war-affected children.

== Resolution ==
=== Observations ===
The Security Council reiterated its commitment to address the impact of armed conflict upon children and emphasised the responsibility of all parties to comply with the United Nations Charter and international law, and end impunity for those responsible for genocide, crimes against humanity, war crimes and crimes against children. It was important that humanitarian personnel had safe and unimpeded access and the coming into force of the Optional Protocol on the Involvement of Children in Armed Conflict was welcomed. The Council further noted that enlisting children under the age of 15 into the national armed forces was classified as a war crime under the Rome Statute of the International Criminal Court.

=== Acts ===
The resolution supported the call of the Secretary-General Kofi Annan for an "era of application" international standards concerning the protection of children in armed conflict. Parties to conflict that were using child soldiers were called upon to end such practices while a dialogue would be established with the parties to develop plans to end their recruitment and use. There was concern at the list of parties violating their international obligations attached in the annex of the Secretary-General's report and further steps would be taken.

Member States were called upon to adopt measures through national legislation to control arms trafficking in states that did not respect international law (the Fourth Geneva Convention) relating to the military use of children and protection of civilians during war. The council was determined to include provisions for the protection of children in the mandates of peacekeeping operations. There was concern at reports of sexual exploitation of women and children, particularly cases involving humanitarian workers and United Nations peacekeepers.

The Security Council requested the implementation of counselling and HIV/AIDS testing services for United Nations peacekeepers, police and humanitarian personnel. All concerned parties and other states were called upon to ensure that the rights of children were incorporated into peace and disarmament, demobilisation and reintegration processes, and to abide by commitments made to the Special Representative of the Secretary-General for Children and Armed Conflict, Olara Otunnu.

Finally, the Secretary-General was instructed to submit a report by 31 October 2003 on the implementation of the current resolution, including a specific section on the protection of children in all of his future country-specific reports.

== See also ==
- Convention on the Rights of the Child
- List of international instruments relevant to the worst forms of child labour
- List of United Nations Security Council Resolutions 1401 to 1500 (2002–2003)
