= United Nations Security Council Resolution 1417 =

UN Security Council Resolution 1417
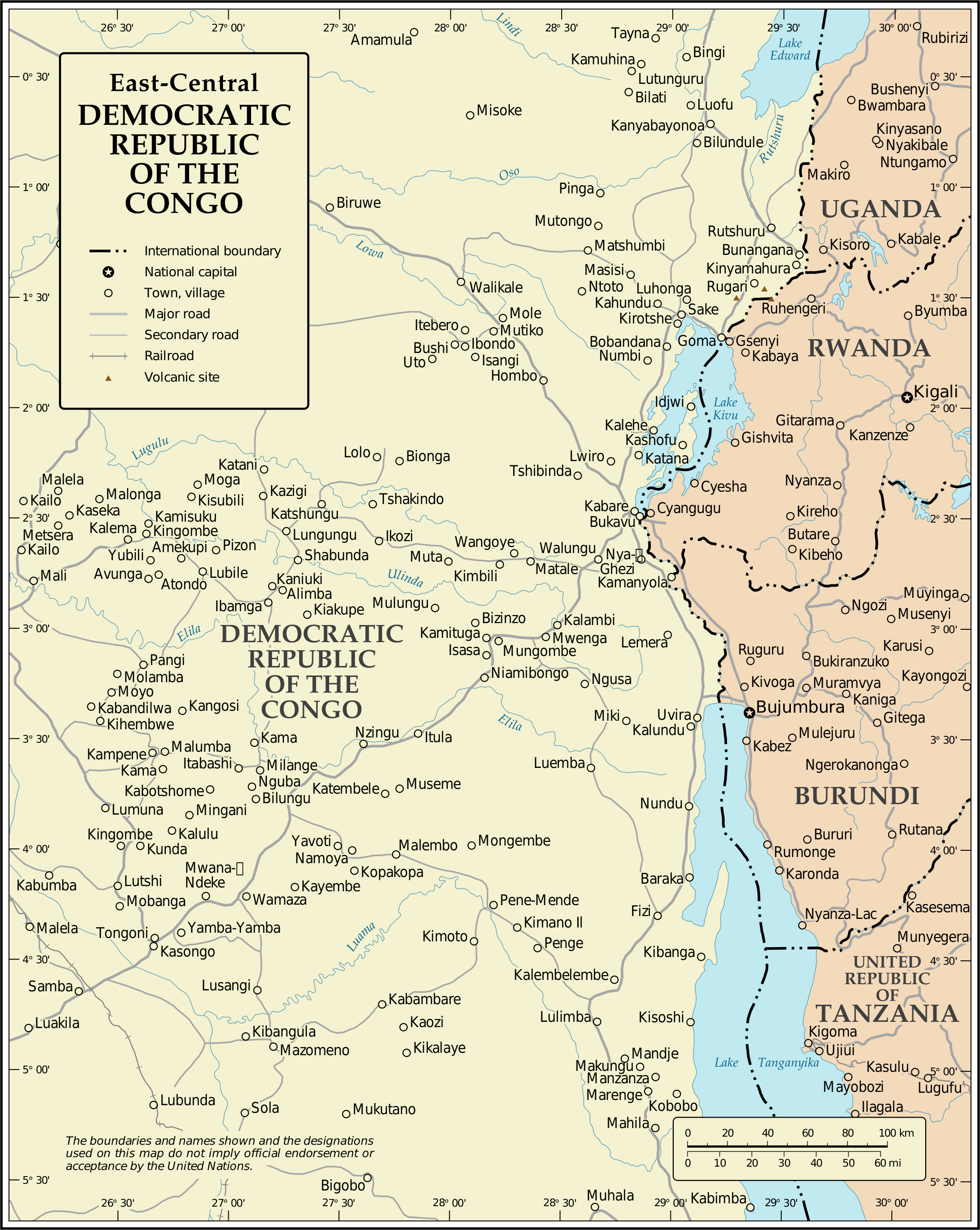
- Eastern Democratic Republic of the Congo
- Date: 14 June 2002
- Meeting no.: 4,554
- Code: S/RES/1417 (Document)
- Subject: The situation concerning the Democratic Republic of the Congo
- Voting summary: 15 voted for; None voted against; None abstained
- Result: Adopted

Security Council composition
- Permanent members: China; France; Russia; United Kingdom; United States
- Non-permanent members: Bulgaria; Cameroon; Colombia; Guinea; Ireland; Mauritius; Mexico; Norway; Singapore; Syria

United Nations Security Council Resolution 1417 extended the mandate of the United Nations Organisation Mission in the Democratic Republic of Congo (MONUC) until 30 June 2003. It was unanimously adopted by the United Nations Security Council on 14 June 2002, at its 4,554th meeting. Resolution 1417 was passed after the security council recalled its previous resolutions regarding the matter, particularly Resolution 1355 (2001).

== Resolution ==
=== Observations ===
The council stressed the obligation of all states to refrain from using force to disrupt the independence and territorial integrity of other states. It also affirmed DRC's sovereignty over its natural resources and awaited a report by an expert panel regarding illegal exploitation of the country's resources. Meanwhile, the Council noted the idea of implementing a curtain of troops for assistance and asked the secretary-general to consider such an idea if requested by MONUC. The resolution recognized the importance of electoral support in achieving governmental transition.

=== Acts ===
United Nations member states were called upon to deliver the required strength of 5,537 MONUC personnel (an increase from the existing 3,800). An increase in the troop ceiling had been proposed by Secretary-General Kofi Annan depending on progress made with regard to Resolution 1376 (2001). On 14 May 2002 the council condemned calls for violence made in the city of Kisangani, as well as attacks against both civilians and soldiers. It was the responsibility of the Rally for Congolese Democracy (residential system development) to end violations of human rights, extrajudicial killings, harassment of civilians and also for lowering restrictions on MONUC personnel.

MONUC's mandate to take all necessary actions was reaffirmed with regard to protecting United Nations and Joint Military Commission personnel and equipment, ensure the safety of freedom of movement of MONUC personnel and protect civilians under immediate threat of violence. MONUC requested to deploy an additional 85 police trainers to Kisangani and aided in the disarmament, demobilisation, repatriation, resettlement and reintegration (DDRRR) process of Kindu and Kisangani.

While noting that the number of foreign forces in the DRC had decreased, the resolution demanded the full withdrawal of all foreign troops in accordance with previous Security Council resolutions. The governments of the Democratic Republic of the Congo and Rwanda were urged to address security issues at the root of the conflict and undertake confidence-building measures. Meanwhile, Inter-Congolese dialogue was supported by the Security Council and it was made clear that the primary responsibility of the dialogue rested with the Congolese parties, whilst stressing the role of the Security Council in supporting the process. The Secretary-General was required to report every four months on the resolution's implementation.

== See also ==
- List of United Nations Security Council Resolutions 1401 to 1500 (2002–2003)
- Lusaka Ceasefire Agreement
- Second Congo War
