= United Nations Security Council Resolution 1379 =

UN Security Council Resolution 1379
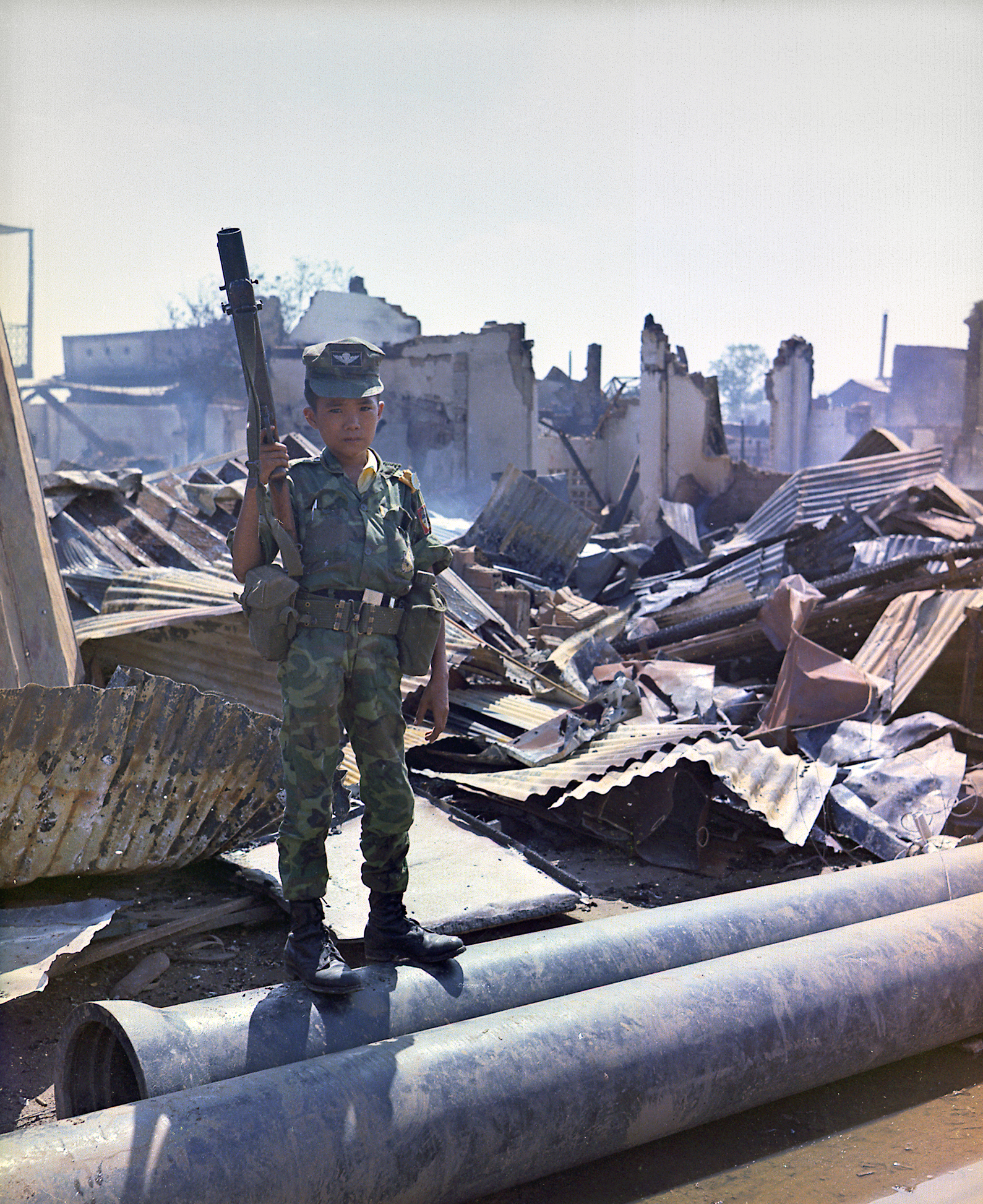
- Child soldier in Vietnam
- Date: 20 November 2001
- Meeting no.: 4,423
- Code: S/RES/1379 (Document)
- Subject: Children and armed conflict
- Voting summary: 15 voted for; None voted against; None abstained
- Result: Adopted

Security Council composition
- Permanent members: China; France; Russia; United Kingdom; United States
- Non-permanent members: Bangladesh; Colombia; Ireland; Jamaica; Mali; Mauritius; Norway; Singapore; Tunisia; Ukraine

United Nations Security Council resolution 1379, adopted unanimously on 20 November 2001, after recalling resolutions 1261 (1999), 1265 (1999), 1296 (2000), 1306 (2000), 1308 (2000), 1314 (2000) and 1325 (2000), the Council considered provisions to protect children during peacekeeping operations and requested the Secretary-General to identify parties to conflict that used or recruited child soldiers.

Prior to the adoption of Resolution 1379, the first child to speak at the Security Council, a former soldier in Sierra Leone, urged the body to do everything possible to assist young people forced to fight in situations of armed conflict around the world.

== Resolution ==
=== Observations ===
The Security Council recognised the impact of armed conflict on children and consequences on peace, security and development. It stated its commitment to address the impact of armed conflict on children and underlined the need for all concerned parties to comply with the provisions of the United Nations Charter and international law.

=== Acts ===
The council pledged to consider the protection of children in armed conflict when discussing matters with which the council was seized, and provisions for protecting children when considering the mandates of peacekeeping operations. It supported ongoing work by Secretary-General, the Special Representative of the Secretary-General for Children and Armed Conflict, the United Nations Children's Fund, the United Nations High Commissioner for Refugees, the Office of the United Nations High Commissioner for Human Rights and others. The importance of unimpeded access for humanitarian organisations to areas of conflict, particularly for vulnerable groups, was stressed. It would also address the impact of sanctions on children. Furthermore, the council intended to consider connections between armed conflict and terrorism, the illegal trade in precious minerals, illicit arms trafficking, and other criminal activities.

All parties to armed conflict were called upon to:

(a) respect international instruments relating to children in armed conflict;
(b) protect and provide assistance to refugees and internally displaced persons;
(c) promote and protect the rights of girls in armed conflict;
(d) abide by commitments made to the Special Representative of the Secretary-General for Children and Armed Conflict;
(e) provide protection for children in peace agreements.

All member states, the secretary-general, United Nations bodies and various international organisations were also asked to address the protection of children and child soldiers in areas of armed conflict. The Secretary-General Kofi Annan was requested to submit a report by 31 October 2002 on the implementation of the current resolution and to list parties involved in armed conflict that recruited children in violation of their international obligations; 23 parties were subsequently named.

== See also ==
- List of international instruments relevant to the worst forms of child labour
- List of United Nations Security Council Resolutions 1301 to 1400 (2000–2002)
