= Lucens Castle =

Castle in Lucens, Switzerland

- Château de Lucens
- Lucens in Switzerland
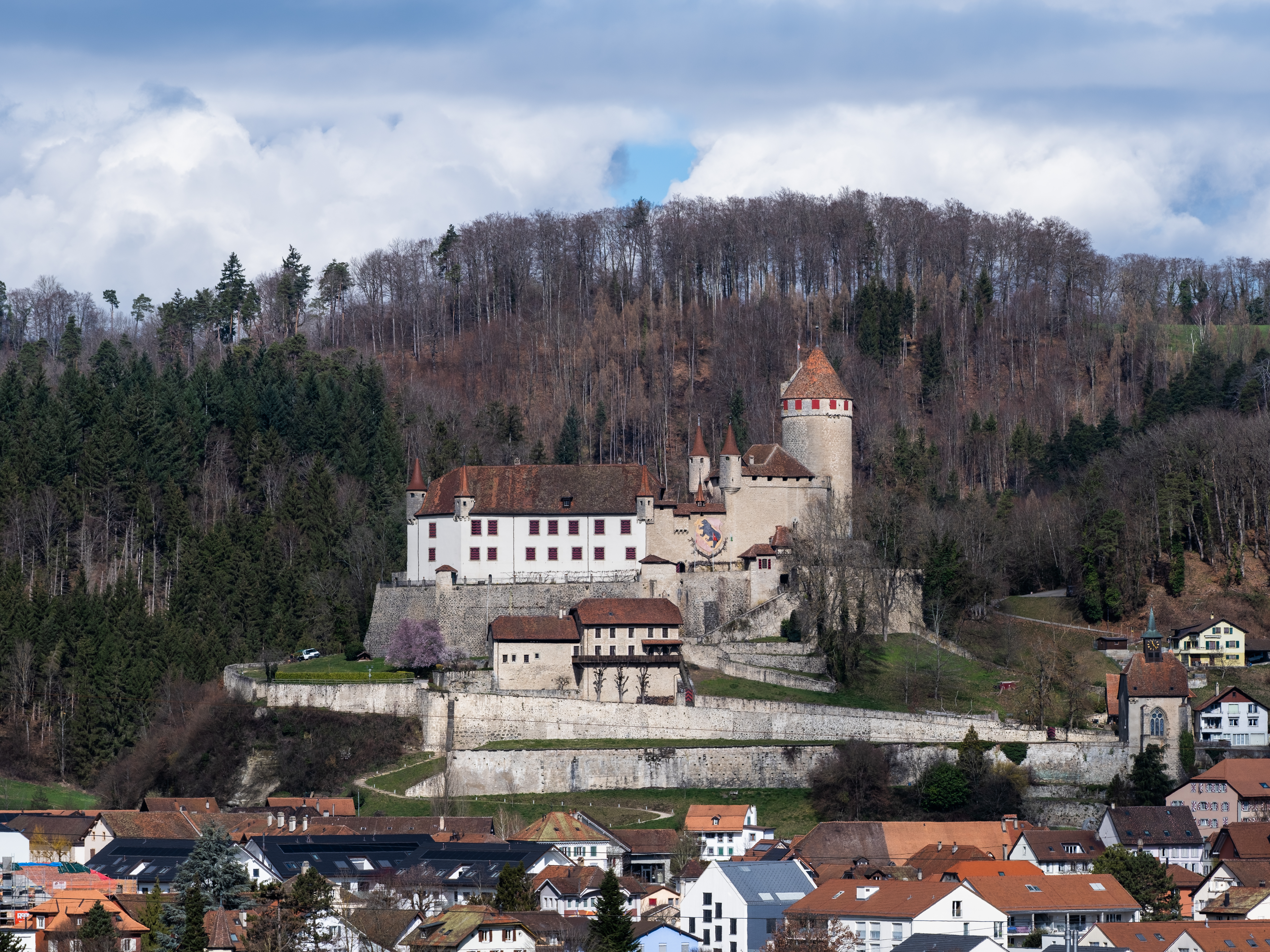
- Lucens Castle

Site information
- Type: Medieval Tower house

Location
- Location within Canton of Vaud Location within Switzerland
- Coordinates: 46°42′36″N 6°50′19″E

Site history
- Built: 13th century

Garrison information
- Occupants: Évêques de Lausanne

Swiss Cultural Property of National Significance

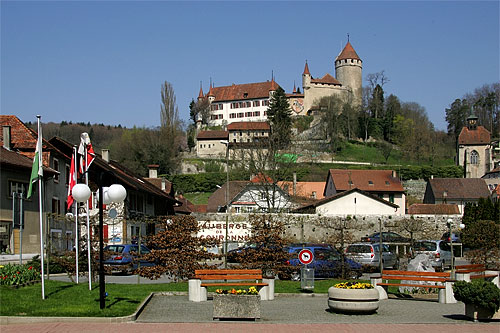
Town of Lucens with the Castle on its hill

Lucens Castle is a castle in the municipality of Lucens in the canton of Vaud in Switzerland. It is a Swiss heritage site of national significance.

== History ==
The castle's strategic location allowed it to control the Broye valley, which was an important transit corridor. Starting in the Middle Ages and until 1536 it was a residence of the Bishop of Lausanne and served to control the bishop's land in the Broye valley. During the 12th century, the castle was repeatedly destroyed and rebuilt. In 1476, it was destroyed by the Swiss Confederation. In 1536 the valley and the surrounding territory were conquered by Bern. It became the seat of a Bernese bailiwick at the same time. In 1542, the vogt of Moudon moved into the castle. It was enlarged between 1579 and 1586 and served as an arsenal and fortress on the border to Fribourg. In 1798, the Bernese were forced out and the Canton of Léman was formed. Shortly thereafter, the castle became the property of Canton, who sold it 1801 to private individuals. In 1925, it was converted into a Swiss Reformed institute for girls. Between 1965 and 1970, it was the seat of the Conan Doyle Foundation, and is now in private hands.

== Lucens Guidelines for Protecting Schools from Military Use ==
On 26–28 November 2012, experts from around the world met at Lucens Castle, to discuss developing international guidelines to better protect schools and universities from military use. The resulting document is known as the Draft Lucens Guidelines for Protecting Schools and Universities from Military Use during Armed Conflict.

The Draft Lucens Guidelines urge all parties to armed conflict "not to use schools and universities for any purpose in support of the military effort", and then provides six guidelines of "responsible practice" for parties so as to avoid impinging on students' safety and education. The finalized guidelines then became available for countries to endorse through the Safe Schools Declaration, and have gone on to influence national legislation and military doctrine and policy.

== See also ==
- List of castles in Switzerland
- Château
