= United Nations Security Council Resolution 1376 =

UN Security Council Resolution 1376
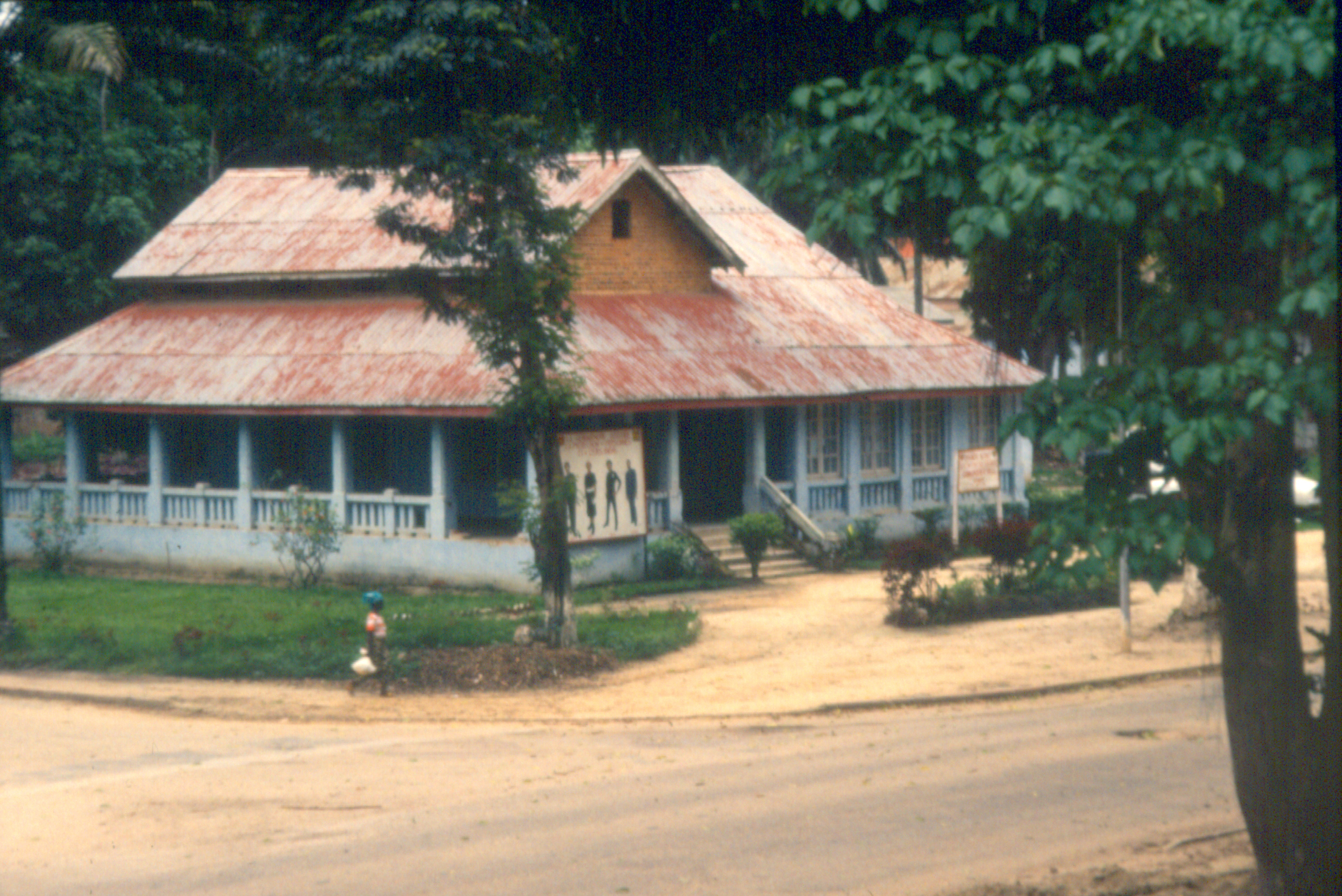
- Kisangani in the Democratic Republic of the Congo
- Date: 9 November 2001
- Meeting no.: 4,412
- Code: S/RES/1376 (Document)
- Subject: The situation concerning the Democratic Republic of the Congo
- Voting summary: 15 voted for; None voted against; None abstained
- Result: Adopted

Security Council composition
- Permanent members: China; France; Russia; United Kingdom; United States
- Non-permanent members: Bangladesh; Colombia; Ireland; Jamaica; Mali; Mauritius; Norway; Singapore; Tunisia; Ukraine

United Nations Security Council resolution 1376, adopted unanimously on 9 November 2001, after recalling all previous resolutions on situation in the Democratic Republic of the Congo, the Council supported the third phase of the deployment of the United Nations Mission in the Democratic Republic of Congo (MONUC).

== Resolution ==
=== Observations ===
In the preamble of the resolution, all countries were reminded against the use of force against another country. The sovereignty, territorial integrity and independence of the Democratic Republic of the Congo was reaffirmed, including over its natural resources.

=== Acts ===
The Security Council noted that all parties had generally respected the Lusaka Ceasefire Agreement but remained concerned at the continuing hostilities in the east of the country. It welcomed the withdrawal of Namibian forces as a positive step towards the withdrawal of all foreign forces, with remaining contingents asked to leave in accordance with Resolution 1304 (2000). The Council demanded the full demilitarisation of Kisangani which was occupied by the RCD-Goma and welcomed the deployment of MONUC personnel to the city for police training purposes.

The resolution supported dialogue between Congolese parties and at the same time expressed concern at human rights violations, the humanitarian situation and economic difficulties, and condemned the illegal exploitation of natural resources in the Democratic Republic of the Congo. It also emphasised connections between the peace process in the country with the process in Burundi where progress had been made.

The Security Council supported the third phase of deployment of MONUC, particularly in the east of the country including Kisangani and Kindu. It affirmed that the deployment required the following steps:

(a) transfer information needed to plan MONUC's support for the total withdrawal of foreign troops in the Democratic Republic of the Congo in accordance with Resolution 1355 (2001);
(b) transmit information needed to plan MONUC's role in the process of disarmament, demobilisation, repatriation, resettlement and reintegration (DDRRR) programme for armed groups;
(c) establish dialogue between the governments of the Democratic Republic of the Congo and Rwanda regarding confidence-building measures and mechanisms for co-ordination;
(d) establish conditions conducive to the voluntary DDRRR of members of armed groups;
(e) demilitarise Kisangani;
(f) restore freedom of movement of persons and goods between Kisangani and the capital Kinshasa;
(g) full co-operation by all parties with MONUC.

== See also ==
- List of United Nations Security Council Resolutions 1301 to 1400 (2000–2002)
- Second Congo War
