= Military use of schools =

Use of school facilities by armed forces

Military use of schools is a term used to refer to the various activities that national armed forces and non-state armed groups carry out in and around schools, universities, and other education facilities, in support of their military effort. Examples of this include using a school or a university as barracks or bases, for offensive or defensive deployments, for storage of weapons or ammunition, for military training of soldiers, as observation posts, and as a detention facility.

The United Nations Security Council has encouraged all "Member States to take concrete measures to deter such use of schools by armed forces and armed groups."

According to the UN Secretary-General: "The use of schools for military purposes puts children at risk of attack and hampers children’s right to education... Such use of schools not only results in reduced enrolment and high drop out rates, especially among girls, but also may lead to schools being considered legitimate targets for attack."

== Countries and groups involved in military use of schools ==
According to the Global Coalition to Protect Education from Attack, between 2005 and 2015 there were instances of military use of schools in Afghanistan, Burma/Myanmar, Central African Republic, Chad, Colombia, Côte d'Ivoire, Democratic Republic of Congo, Egypt, Ethiopia, Georgia, India, Indonesia, Iraq, Israel/Occupied Palestinian Territory, Kenya, Libya, Mali, Myanmar, Nepal, Nigeria, Pakistan, Philippines, Somalia, South Sudan, Sri Lanka, Sudan, Syria, Thailand, Uganda, Ukraine, Yemen and Zimbabwe.

The 2016 UN Secretary-General’s Children and Armed Conflict report documented military use of schools in 14 countries by at least 10 national armed forces and multiple armed groups. According to the report, the following groups used schools for military purposes during 2015: Afghan National Defence and Security Forces as well as the Taliban and an ISIL-affiliated group in Afghanistan; former Séléka factions in the Central African Republic; the Colombian military and the FARC-EP in Colombia; the Congolese armed forces and armed groups in the Democratic Republic of the Congo; the Iraqi security forces and ISIL in Iraq; the Darnah Mujahideen Shura Council in Libya; armed groups in Mali; the Tatmadaw (government armed forces) in Myanmar; the Nigerian security forces and Boko Haram in Nigeria; the Armed Forces of the Philippines and paramilitary groups, and the Bangsamoro Islamic Freedom Fighters in the Philippines; the Somali National Army in Somalia; the Sudan People’s Liberation Army and other government forces and the Sudan People’s Liberation Movement/Army in Opposition in South Sudan; government forces in Syria; Houthi forces, popular committees, and unknown armed groups in Yemen.

== United Nations Security Council Action ==
Under United Nations Security Council Resolution 1998 in 2011, the Security Council urged "parties to armed conflict to refrain from actions that impede children’s access to education," and requested that the UN Secretary-General "monitor and report ... on the military use of schools ... in contravention of international humanitarian law...".

Under United Nations Security Council Resolution 2143 in 2014, the Security Council expressed "deep concern at the military use of schools in contravention of applicable international law, recognizing that such use may render schools legitimate targets of attack, thus endangering children's and teacher's safety as well as children's education." Further, the Security Council urged "all parties to armed conflict to respect the civilian character of schools in accordance with international humanitarian law;" encouraged "Member States to consider concrete measures to deter the use of schools by armed forces and armed non-State groups in contravention of applicable international law;" urged "Member States to ensure that attacks on schools in contravention of international humanitarian law are investigated and those responsible duly prosecuted;" and called "upon United Nations country-level task forces to enhance the monitoring and reporting on the military use of schools."

In 2015, the Security Council strengthened its language and in Resolution 2225 encouraged all "Member States to take concrete measures to deter such use of schools by armed forces and armed groups."

== Legality ==
The legality of military use of schools is governed by a combination of international humanitarian law (also known at the "law of armed conflict"), international human rights law, and domestic law.

=== International humanitarian law ===
Military use of schools is restricted, but not always prohibited, by international humanitarian law. Parties to an armed conflict are required, to the maximum extent feasible, to a) avoid locating military objectives within or near densely populated areas, including where schools and universities are likely to be located; b) endeavour to remove the civilian population, individual civilians and civilian objects under their control from the vicinity of military objectives; and c) take the other necessary precautions to protect those schools and universities under their control against the dangers resulting from military operations.

According to the UN Special Representative to the Secretary-General on Children and Armed Conflict: "International humanitarian law prohibits armed forces and groups from using schools while children and teachers are using them for educational purposes." And according to Human Rights Watch it is "unlawful to use a school simultaneously as an armed stronghold and as an educational center."

Under the Fourth Geneva Convention, applicable during international armed conflicts, an occupying power shall, with the cooperation of the national and local authorities, "facilitate the proper working of all institutions devoted to the care and education of children."

Under Additional Protocol II, applicable during non-international armed conflicts, it is a "fundamental guarantee" that children shall receive an education, in keeping with the wishes of their parents.

The Roerich Pact states that "[E]ducational … institutions shall be considered as neutral and as such respected and protected by belligerents … The same respect and protection shall be accorded to … educational … institutions in time of peace as well as in war."

=== International human rights law ===
International human rights law guarantees students, teachers, and education staff the right to life, personal liberty, and security. States are also required to ensure to the maximum extent possible the survival and the development of children.

Moreover, everyone has the right to education. With a view to achieving the full realisation of this right, states shall make primary education compulsory and available free to all; secondary education generally available and accessible to all; and higher education equally accessible to all on the basis of capacity. Under the Convention on the Rights of the Child, states are required to take measures to encourage regular attendance by children at schools and the reduction of child drop-out rates.

Explaining the right to education provided for by the International Covenant on Economic, Social and Cultural Rights, the UN's Committee on Economic, Social and Cultural Rights has stated that "There is a strong presumption of impermissibility of any retrogressive measures taken in relation to the right to education… If any deliberately retrogressive measures are taken, the State party has the burden of proving that they have been introduced after the most careful consideration of all alternatives and that they are fully justified by reference to the totality of the rights provided for in the Covenant and in the context of the full use of the State party's maximum available resources."

The Committee on the Rights of the Child, the body of independent experts who review countries' adherence to the Convention on the Rights of the Child, has responded to evidence of military use of schools by calling for its cessation, the impartial investigation and prosecution of those responsible,; for any damage caused to be promptly and fully restored. and for the prohibition of military use of schools in domestic legislation.

The Committee on the Elimination of Discrimination against Women, the body of independent experts who review countries’ adherence to the International Convention on the Elimination of All Forms of Discrimination against Women, has also called for the prohibition of occupation of schools by security forces in areas affected by armed conflict, in response to evidence of sexual harassment of girls and school drop-out due to the presence of security forces on school grounds and for the prohibition of military use of schools in domestic legislation.

=== Domestic law ===
Some countries have adopted legislation banning or restricting the military use of schools and/or universities. Some national armed forces and non-state armed groups have banned or regulated the practice, through military manuals or general orders. Meanwhile, domestic courts have also called upon national forces to vacate schools.

==== Examples of legislation ====
Argentina's Higher Education Law (1995): "Public forces cannot enter the national universities without prior written order from a competent court or a request from the lawfully constituted university authority."

Central African Republic's Child Protection Code (2020): "Any ... occupation of schools ... is prohibited. Anyone who has ... occupied a school ... is punished by imprisonment of ten (10) to twenty (20) years and / or a fine of 5,000,000 to 20,000,000 francs."

Ecuador's Higher Education Law (2010): "The campuses of universities and polytechnics are inviolable... When the protection of public forces is needed, the legal representative of the institution will request the relevant assistance… Those who violate these campuses will be sanctioned in accordance with law."

India's Requisitioning and Acquisition of Immovable Property Act (1952): "[N]o property or part thereof … exclusively used … as a school, … or for the purpose of accommodation of persons connected with the management of … such school … shall be requisitioned."

Ireland's Defence Act (1954): "Nothing in this section [on military manoeuvres] shall authorize … the entry on or interference with (except to the extent of using any road) any … school … [or] ground attached to any … school".

Philippines Act Providing for Stronger Deterrence and Special Protection against Child Abuse, Exploitation, and Discrimination (1992): "Public infrastructure such as schools … shall not be utilized for military purposes such as command posts, barracks, detachments, and supply depots…"

Philippines, Special Protection of Children in Situations of Armed Conflict Act (2019): "Any person found guilty of committing [occupation of schools or disruption of educational activities] ... shall suffer the penalty of imprisonment of not less than fourteen (14) years but not more than twenty (20) years and a fine of not less than One million pesos (P 1,000,000.00) but not more than Two million pesos (P2,000,000.00)."

Poland's Armed Forces of Poland Accommodation Act (1995): "The following types of real property are not subject to temporary quartering: … real property of institutions of higher education".

==== Examples of military manuals and orders ====
Colombia, General Commander of the Military Forces order of 6 July 2010: "Considering International Humanitarian Law norms, it is considered a clear violation of the Principle of Distinction and the Principle of Precaution in attacks and, therefore a serious fault, the fact that a commander occupies or allows the occupation by his troops, of … public institutions such as education establishments".

New Zealand, Manual of Armed Forces Law, 2019: "[New Zealand Defence Forces] commanders are to take all practicable steps to protect the right of children to have an education. Use and occupation of schools and other educational institutions obviously inhibits the exercise of this right and is to be avoided wherever possible. Where, for military reasons, it is necessary for the force to use such an institution, for example for accommodating personnel, storage of materiel or as part of a defensive position, all feasible steps must be taken, in consultation with local authorities, to ensure that the disruption to the education of children is reduced as much as practicable. This may include identifying and facilitating the use of other suitable facilities for such purposes. … Members of the NZDF are not to use school buildings or facilities for military purposes unless it is absolutely necessary."

Philippines, Armed Forces of the Philippines Letter Directive No. 34, 24 November 2009: "To attain this objective, all [Armed Forces of the Philippines] personnel shall strictly abide and respect the following: … Basic infrastructure such as schools ... shall not be utilized for military purposes such as command posts, barracks, detachments, and supply depots."

South Sudan, Order from Deputy Chief of General Staff for Moral Orientation, 16 April 2012: "This act of occupation [of schools by our army] is deplorable and it is [in] violation of our law of land. Besides, you are depriving our children from the much needed education… I hereby order you to urgently evacuate the … schools occupied by the forces under your direct commands… Failure to evacuate the above mentioned schools will lead to severe disciplinary actions and the act is a serious violation of the law of our land which shall bear regrettable implications…"

United Kingdom Joint Service Manual of the Law of Armed Conflict (2004): "[T]he better view is that the law also prohibits: … the use of cultural property for purposes which are likely to expose it to destruction or damage in armed conflict, unless there is no feasible alternative to such use… Cultural property includes … institutions dedicated to … education…"

United States Field Manual 27-10 (1956): "The United States and certain of the American Republics are parties to the so-called [Roerich] Pact, which accords a neutralized and protected status to … educational … institutions in the event of war between such States."

==== Examples of court decisions ====
Constitutional Court of Colombia, Yenys Osuna Montes v. the Mayor of Zambrano Municipality: "[T]he city’s mayor should prevent members of the State security forces from entering the school premises to conduct practices, trainings or to mount weapons, ammunition or deploy armed personnel, as this would increase the danger to the student community."

Supreme Court of India, Exploitation of Children in Orphanages in the State of Tamil Nadu v. Union of India and others: "[I]t should be ensured that the school buildings and hostels are not allowed to be occupied by the armed or security forces in future for whatsoever purpose".

==== Practice of non-state armed groups ====
International humanitarian law binds non-state armed groups that are engaged in an armed conflict. To regulate the conduct of their forces, many such groups issue orders, directives, principles, rules, or make declarations of their intentions to adhere to certain standards.

The Free Syrian Army, Syria: "[O]ccupation [of schools] by military forces represents a direct violation of domestic and international law. … [T]he Free Syrian Army today states its official position prohibiting the militarization of schools and... and will amend its Proclamation of Principles to reflect the same. This statement will be circulated among all of our battalions and guide the actions of our members. Any individuals found to violate the principles listed in our proclamation will be held accountable, in accordance with international law. – Declaration signed by President of Syrian Opposition Coalition and Chief of Staff of Supreme Military Council, Free Syrian Army, April 30, 2014

National Coalition of Syrian Revolution and Opposition Forces, Syria: "We affirm our responsibility to respect International Humanitarian Law at all times including … the responsibilities to … [r]espect and protect schools and hospitals, and refrain from using in them in support of the military effort, including by locating military objectives within or near them." — National Coalition of Syrian Revolution and Opposition Forces, Declaration of Commitment on Compliance with IHL and the Facilitation of Humanitarian Assistance, 2014

Thirteen non-state actors have signed the "Deed of Commitment for the Protection of Children from the Effects of Armed Conflict" developed by the non-governmental organization Geneva Call, which includes the provision: " "We will … avoid using for military purposes schools or premises primarily used by children.". As of March 23, 2015, the following parties have signed this instrument: Chin National Front/Army (CNF/CNA) [Burma/Myanmar]; Karen National Union/Karen National Liberation Army (KNU/KNLA) [Burman/Myanmar]; Karenni National Progressive Party/Karenni Army (KNPP/KA) [Burma/Myanmar]; New Mon State Party/Mon National Liberation Army (NMSP/ MNLA) [Burma/Myanmar]; Pa’O National Liberation Organization / Pa-o National Liberation Army (PNLO/PNLA) [Burma/Myanmar]; National Socialist Council of Nagaland (Khole-Kitovi) (NSCN-KK) [India]; Democratic Party of Iranian Kurdistan (PDKI) [Iran]; Komala Party of Iranian Kurdistan (KPIK) [Iran], Komala Party of Kurdistan (KPK) [Iran], Komalah-The Kurdistan Organization of the Communist Party for Iran, Komalah-The Kurdistan Organization of the Communist Party for Iran (KDP-Iran) [Iran]; Democratic Self-Administration in Rojava / People’s Protection Units / Women’s Protection Units (YPG-YPJ) [Syria]; People’s Defence Forces/Kurdistan Worker’s Party (HPG/PKK))[Turkey].

== Guidelines for Protecting Schools and Universities from Military Use during Armed Conflict ==
On 26–28 November 2012, experts from around the world met at Lucens Castle in Lucens, Switzerland, to discuss developing international guidelines to better protect schools and universities from military use. The resulting document is known as the Draft Lucens Guidelines for Protecting Schools and Universities from Military Use during Armed Conflict. The author of the Draft Lucens Guidelines is Professor Steven Haines, Chair of Public International Law in the University of Greenwich in London who served for over 30 years as an officer in the British Armed Forces. Throughout the drafting process, over thirty states and international organizations made public statements in support of the initiative.

In June 2014, Norway announced that it would lead the process to finalize the Guidelines and promote their endorsement and implementation.

The final Guidelines for Protecting Schools and Universities from Military Use during Armed Conflict were unveiled in December 2014 in Geneva at a meeting organized by Norway and Argentina. The Guidelines urge parties to armed conflict not to use schools and universities for any purpose in support of their military effort. While acknowledging that certain uses would not be contrary to the law of armed conflict, the Guidelines outline concrete measures as a guide to responsible practice for all parties to conflict to avoid impinging on students’ safety and education. A Safe Schools Declaration was developed through consultations led by Norway and Argentina throughout the first half of 2015. The Declaration provides States the opportunity to express broad political support for the protection and continuation of education in armed conflict, and for the implementation of the Guidelines. The Safe Schools Declaration was opened for endorsement at an international conference in Oslo on May 29, 2015.

In her 2014 annual report to the UN Human Rights Council, Leila Zerrougui, the Special Representative to the Secretary-General for Children and Armed Conflict, welcomed the release of the Guidelines for Protecting Schools and Universities from Military Use during Armed Conflict and encouraged Member States to adopt them."

== See also ==
- International Day to Protect Education from Attack
- Safe Schools Declaration
