= United Nations Security Council Resolution 1323 =

UN Security Council Resolution 1323
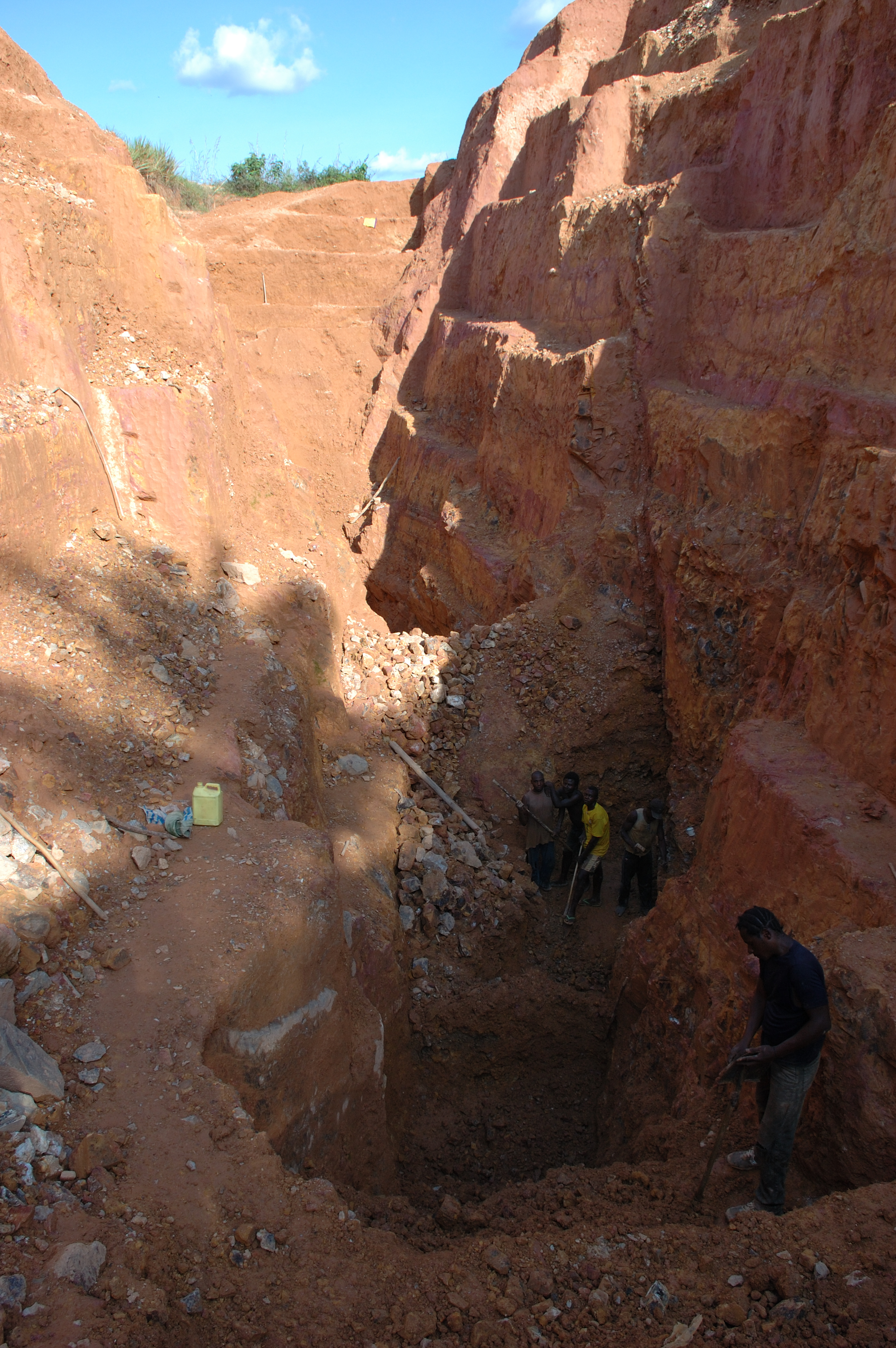
- Mining in the Democratic Republic of the Congo
- Date: 13 October 2000
- Meeting no.: 4,207
- Code: S/RES/1323 (Document)
- Subject: The situation concerning the Democratic Republic of the Congo
- Voting summary: 15 voted for; None voted against; None abstained
- Result: Adopted

Security Council composition
- Permanent members: China; France; Russia; United Kingdom; United States
- Non-permanent members: Argentina; Bangladesh; Canada; Jamaica; Malaysia; Mali; Namibia; Netherlands; Tunisia; Ukraine

United Nations Security Council resolution 1323, adopted unanimously on 13 October 2000, after recalling resolutions 1291 (2000), 1304 (2000) and 1316 (2000) on situation in the Democratic Republic of the Congo, the Council extended the mandate of the United Nations Mission in the Democratic Republic of Congo (MONUC) until 15 December 2000.

The Security Council deplored the continuation of hostilities in the Democratic Republic of the Congo, the lack of co-operation with the United Nations and lack of progress towards a national dialogue. It expressed concern at the consequences of the conflict on the humanitarian and human rights situation in the country, including the illegal exploitation of natural resources. Speaking during the meeting, members of the Council said that progress had to be made with respect to previous resolutions on the conflict within two months, with threats to terminate MONUC.

== See also ==
- List of United Nations Security Council Resolutions 1301 to 1400 (2000–2002)
- Lusaka Ceasefire Agreement
- Second Congo War
