= International Day to Protect Education from Attack =

United Nations observance

The International Day to Protect Education from Attack is an international observance established by a unanimous decision of the United Nations General Assembly in 2020. It is observed on September 9 of each year. The day generates attention to attacks on students, teachers, and education institutions during armed conflict, the use of schools for military purposes, as well as efforts aimed at promoting and protecting the right to education and facilitating the continuation of education in armed conflict, including the Safe Schools Declaration.

UNICEF (the UN's children's rights agency) and UNESCO (the United Nations Educational, Scientific and Cultural Organization) were invited to facilitate the day's observance.

The resolution proclaiming the Day was presented by Qatar and co-sponsored by 62 countries.

In 2020, on the following day, the United Nations Security Council held an open debate to discuss protecting students, teachers, and schools during times of armed conflict, and under the leadership of Niger, issued its first ever Presidential Statement dedicated solely to protecting children's education from attack.
