= United Nations Security Council Resolution 1304 =

UN Security Council Resolution 1304
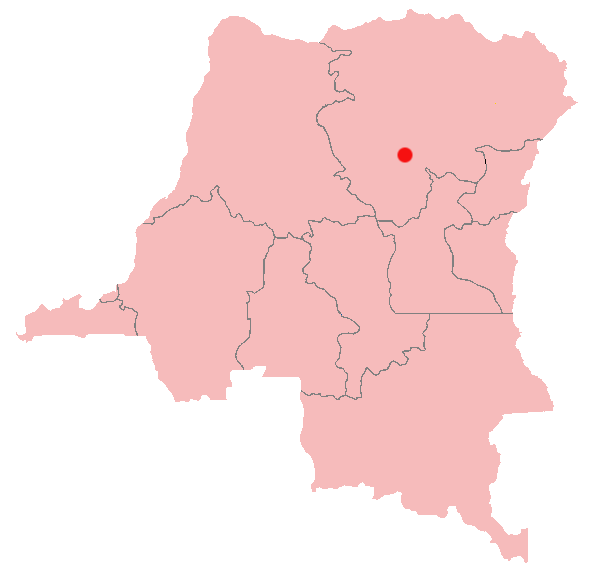
- Location of Kisangani in the Democratic Republic of the Congo
- Date: 16 June 2000
- Meeting no.: 4,159
- Code: S/RES/1304 (Document)
- Subject: The situation concerning the Democratic Republic of the Congo
- Voting summary: 15 voted for; None voted against; None abstained
- Result: Adopted

Security Council composition
- Permanent members: China; France; Russia; United Kingdom; United States
- Non-permanent members: Argentina; Bangladesh; Canada; Jamaica; Malaysia; Mali; Namibia; Netherlands; Tunisia; Ukraine

United Nations Security Council resolution 1304, adopted unanimously on 16 June 2000, after recalling resolutions 1234 (1999), 1258 (1999), 1273 (1999), 1279 (1999), 1291 (1999) and 1296 (2000) on situation in the Democratic Republic of the Congo, the Council demanded the immediate withdrawal of Ugandan, Rwandan, Congolese opposition and other armed groups from Kisangani in the Democratic Republic of the Congo.

The resolution primarily focused on fighting in the city of Kisangani in northern Democratic Republic of Congo, which had claimed up to 160 lives prior to the adoption of Resolution 1304.

== Resolution ==
=== Observations ===
There was concern about reports of illegal exploitation of the country's natural resources, which was being investigated by an expert panel. The council was also concerned about the ongoing fighting in the country, particularly the renewed fighting between Uganda and Rwanda in Kisangani and their failure to comply with their obligations under the Lusaka Ceasefire Agreement. It regretted the delay in implementing the agreement and the lack of co-operation by the Government of the Democratic Republic of the Congo with mediation efforts. Furthermore, it was alarmed about the humanitarian situation in the country and its impact upon the civilian population, and violations of human rights in the east of the Democratic Republic of the Congo. The situation in the country continued to constitute a threat to peace and security in the region.

=== Acts ===
Acting under Chapter VII of the United Nations Charter, all parties were called upon to cease hostilities and respect the ceasefire agreement. The resolution condemned fighting between Rwanda, Uganda, Congolese opposition and other armed groups in the Democratic Republic of the Congo as a gross violation of its sovereignty and territorial integrity. It further demanded that Rwanda and Uganda immediately withdraw; that it be reciprocated by other parties to the conflict; and activity by foreign forces immediately end. All offensive actions were prohibited during the process of disengagement and withdrawal of forces, in addition to co-operating with armed groups. No timetable for withdrawal was set. The Secretary-General Kofi Annan was requested to keep the arrangements for the deployment of the United Nations Mission in the Democratic Republic of the Congo (MONUC) under review.

The council welcomed efforts by the parties to engage in a dialogue on disarmament, demobilisation, resettlement and reintegration of members of all armed groups. Meanwhile, it condemned all massacres carried out in the Democratic Republic of the Congo, calling on all parties to the conflict to respect international humanitarian law and ensure access to humanitarian aid agencies. It expressed the view that the governments of Rwanda and Uganda should make reparations for the loss of life and the property damage they had caused in Kisangani.

The resolution concluded by reaffirming the importance of holding a conference on peace and security in the Great Lakes region under the auspicies of the United Nations and Organisation of African Unity, and expressed its intention to consider the imposition of measures if the parties in the Democratic Republic of the Congo did not comply with the current resolution.

== See also ==
- List of United Nations Security Council Resolutions 1301 to 1400 (2000–2002)
- Second Congo War
