= Safe Schools Declaration =

Political commitments for wartime protection of schools

The Safe Schools Declaration is an inter-governmental political commitment that was opened for endorsement by countries at an international conference held in Oslo, Norway, on 28–29 May 2015. The Declaration provides countries the opportunity to express political support for the protection of students, teachers, and schools during times of armed conflict; the importance of the continuation of education during armed conflict; and the implementation of the Guidelines for Protecting Schools and Universities from Military Use during Armed Conflict.

As of February 2026, 123 states have endorsed the Safe Schools Declaration, which remains open for additional countries to join. The Ministry of Foreign Affairs of Norway is the depositary of endorsements.

On March 28–29, 2017, the ministries of foreign affairs and defense of Argentina co-hosted the Second International Safe Schools Conference in Buenos Aires.

In May 2017, the United Nations Secretary General, António Guterres, urged all Member States to endorse the Safe Schools Declaration.

On May 28–29, 2019, the Third International Safe Schools Conference was hosted in Palma De Mallorca, Spain.

On October 25-27, 2021, the Fourth International Conference on the Safe Schools Declaration was hosted in Abuja, Nigeria, and also virtually.

The Declaration has begun to influence countries' military policies for protecting schools from military use.

== Drafting ==
The Safe Schools Declaration was developed through consultations with states led by the ministries of foreign affairs of Norway and Argentina between January and May 2015.

Representatives from more than 60 countries attended the conference launching the Safe Schools Declaration in 2015, along with the Norwegian Foreign Minister Børge Brende, Norwegian Defence Minister Ine Marie Eriksen Søreide, and Ziauddin Yousafzai the father of Nobel Peace Prize laureate Malala Yousafzai.

Representatives from more than 80 countries attended the second Safe Schools Conference in Buenos Aires in 2017.

== Contents and Commitments ==
"The impact of armed conflict on education presents urgent humanitarian, development and wider social challenges. Worldwide, schools and universities have been bombed, shelled and burned, and children, students, teachers and academics have been killed, maimed, abducted or arbitrarily detained. Educational facilities have been used by parties to armed conflict as, inter alia, bases, barracks or detention centres. Such actions expose students and education personnel to harm, deny large numbers of children and students their right to education and so deprive communities of the foundations on which to build their future. In many countries, armed conflict continues to destroy not just school infrastructure, but the hopes and ambitions of a whole generation of children."
– Opening paragraph of Safe Schools Declaration

The Safe Schools Declaration describes the immediate and long-term consequences of attacks on students, teachers, schools, and universities, and the military use of schools and universities, during times of armed conflict. It contrasts this with the positive and protective role that education can have during armed conflict.

By joining the Declaration, states formally endorse the Guidelines for Protecting Schools and Universities from Military Use during Armed Conflict and commit to “bring them into domestic policy and operational frameworks as far as possible and appropriate.”

The Declaration also contains a number of other commitments aimed at strengthening the prevention of, and response to, attacks on education during armed conflict, including by: collecting reliable data on attacks and military use of schools and universities; providing assistance to victims of attacks; investigating allegations of violations of national and international law and prosecuting perpetrators where appropriate; developing and promoting “conflict sensitive” approaches to education; seeking to continue education during armed conflict; and supporting the work of the United Nations on the children and armed conflict agenda.

Lastly, the Declaration is a framework for collaboration and exchange, as endorsing states also agree to meet on a regular basis to review implementation of the Declaration and use of the Guidelines.

== Endorsements ==
As of February 2026, the following 123 countries have endorsed the Declaration:

1. Afghanistan
2. Albania
3. Algeria
4. Angola
5. Argentina
6. Armenia
7. Andorra
8. Antigua and Barbuda
9. Australia
10. Austria
11. Belgium
12. Benin
13. Bolivia
14. Bosnia
15. Botswana
16. Brazil
17. Bulgaria
18. Burkina Faso
19. Cameroon
20. Canada
21. Central African Republic
22. Chad
23. Chile
24. Colombia
25. Costa Rica
26. Cote d'Ivoire
27. Croatia
28. Cyprus
29. Czech Republic
30. Democratic Republic of Congo
31. Denmark
32. Djibouti
33. Dominican Republic
34. Ecuador
35. El Salvador
36. Equatorial Guinea
37. Estonia
38. Fiji
39. Finland
40. France
41. Gambia
42. Georgia
43. Germany
44. Ghana
45. Greece
46. Guatemala
47. Guyana
48. Haiti
49. Honduras
50. Iceland
51. Iraq
52. Ireland
53. Italy
54. Jamaica
55. Jordan
56. Kazakhstan
57. Kenya
58. Kosovo
59. Lebanon
60. Liberia
61. Liechtenstein
62. Luxembourg
63. Macedonia
64. Madagascar
65. Malawi
66. Malaysia
67. Maldives
68. Mali
69. Malta
70. Marshall Islands
71. Mauritius
72. Mexico
73. Moldova
74. Monaco
75. Montenegro
76. Morocco
77. Mozambique
78. Namibia
79. New Zealand
80. Netherlands
81. Nicaragua
82. Niger
83. Nigeria
84. Norway
85. Palau
86. Palestine
87. Panama
88. Paraguay
89. Peru
90. Poland
91. Portugal
92. Qatar
93. Republic of the Congo
94. Romania
95. Rwanda
96. Samoa
97. San Marino
98. Saint Kitts and Nevis
99. Saint Vincent and the Grenadines
100. Senegal
101. Serbia
102. Seychelles
103. Sierra Leone
104. Slovakia
105. Slovenia
106. Somalia
107. South Africa
108. South Sudan
109. Spain
110. Sudan
111. Sweden
112. Switzerland
113. Timor-Leste
114. Togo
115. Tunisia
116. Ukraine
117. United Kingdom
118. United States of America
119. Uruguay
120. Vanuatu
121. Vietnam
122. Yemen
123. Zambia

== Reactions ==
The Secretary-General of the United Nations António Guterres has called upon all countries to endorse the Safe Schools Declaration.

Virginia Gamba, the Special Representative to the UN Secretary-General has said that all countries should endorse the Safe Schools Declaration, as "It has made an essential contribution towards promoting tangible measures to prevent attacks on education."

Former Prime Minister of the United Kingdom, Gordon Brown stated that "every country must now support" the Declaration. The United Kingdom did not initially endorse the Safe Schools Declaration. In a letter from the Foreign and Commonwealth Office (02/03/16), James Duddridge (then the Minister for Africa, the Overseas Territories, and the Caribbean) stated that:

“While we welcome the spirit of the Safe Schools Declaration, we are concerned that the accompanying Guidelines for Protecting Schools and Universities from Military use during Armed Conflict do not mirror the exact language of International Humanitarian Law, which risk complicating the application of International Humanitarian Law”. This has been mirrored in a statement from a representative of the United Kingdom's Foreign and Commonwealth Office.

The United Kingdom eventually endorsed the Safe School Declaration in 2018.

Leila Zerrougui, the former Special Representative to the Secretary-General of the United Nations said that she would "strongly advocate on behalf of children in conflict situations to persuade as many other Member States as we can to throw their support behind the initiative."

Jan Egeland, Secretary General of the Norwegian Refugee Council noted at the Safe Schools conference that "10 years from now we will look back on this day. Those who endorsed will say ‘we should really have done this earlier’. Those who did not endorse will say ‘why did we not endorse it?'"

== See also ==
- International Day to Protect Education from Attack
