= United Nations Security Council Resolution 1291 =

UN Security Council Resolution 1291
- MONUC medal bar
- Date: 24 February 2000
- Meeting no.: 4,104
- Code: S/RES/1291 (Document)
- Subject: The situation concerning the Democratic Republic of the Congo
- Voting summary: 15 voted for; None voted against; None abstained
- Result: Adopted

Security Council composition
- Permanent members: China; France; Russia; United Kingdom; United States
- Non-permanent members: Argentina; Bangladesh; Canada; Jamaica; Malaysia; Mali; Namibia; Netherlands; Tunisia; Ukraine

United Nations Security Council resolution 1291, adopted unanimously on 24 February 2000, after recalling resolutions 1234 (1999), 1258 (1999), 1273 (1999) and 1279 (1999) on situation in the Democratic Republic of the Congo, the Council expanded the United Nations Mission in the Democratic Republic of Congo (MONUC) to include additional tasks and extended its mandate until 31 August 2000.

== Resolution ==
=== Observations ===
The Security Council reaffirmed the Democratic Republic of the Congo's sovereignty over the natural resources in its territory, particularly as there were reports of illegal exploitation of its assets. It called for the withdrawal of foreign troops, the disarmament of armed groups, reaffirmed its support for the Lusaka Ceasefire Agreement and stressed that the authority of the state had to be restored throughout the country.

Phase II of the deployment of MONUC depended on respect for the Ceasefire Agreement, demobilisation and assurances about the safety and freedom of movement of United Nations personnel. There were also serious concerns about human rights violations and the limited access for aid workers to refugees.

=== Acts ===
All parties were reminded of their obligations under the Ceasefire Agreement signed in Lusaka. The Council authorised the expansion of up to 5,337 troops in MONUC including up to 500 military observers. The expanded mission had the following mandate:

(a) monitor implementation of the Ceasefire Agreement;
(b) maintain continuous liaison with the field headquarters of all the parties' military forces;
(c) develop an action plan for the implementation of the Ceasefire Agreement within 45 days;
(d) work to obtain the release of prisoners of war;
(e) supervise and verify disengagement and redeployment of forces;
(f) monitor compliance with the Ceasefire Agreement with regards to weaponry, ammunition and materiel to armed groups;
(g) facilitate humanitarian assistance and human rights monitoring;
(h) co-operate with the Facilitator of Dialogue;
(i) deploy mine action experts and carry out mine action activities.

Acting under Chapter VII of the United Nations Charter, MONUC was authorised to take actions to ensure its freedom of movement and protect civilians from imminent threat. The Council condemned massacres and was concerned at illicit arms flows and illegal exploitation of resources in the Democratic Republic of the Congo.

Finally, the Secretary-General Kofi Annan was requested to report every 60 days on the implementation of the current resolution and continue to plan for additional MONUC deployments.

== See also ==
- List of United Nations Security Council Resolutions 1201 to 1300 (1998–2000)
- Second Congo War
