= United Nations Security Council Resolution 1314 =

UN Security Council Resolution 1314
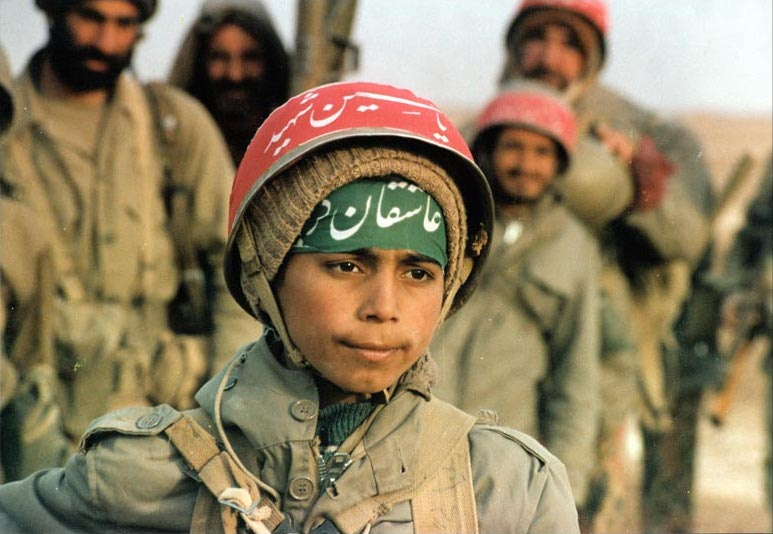
- Child soldier during the Iran–Iraq War
- Date: 11 August 2000
- Meeting no.: 4,185
- Code: S/RES/1314 (Document)
- Subject: Children and armed conflict
- Voting summary: 15 voted for; None voted against; None abstained
- Result: Adopted

Security Council composition
- Permanent members: China; France; Russia; United Kingdom; United States
- Non-permanent members: Argentina; Bangladesh; Canada; Jamaica; Malaysia; Mali; Namibia; Netherlands; Tunisia; Ukraine

United Nations Security Council resolution 1314 was adopted unanimously on 11 August 2000, after recalling Resolution 1261 (1999) on children and armed conflict and other resolutions including 1265 (1999), 1296 (2000) and 1306 (2000). The Council expressed concern at the impact of conflict upon children and the use of child soldiers, and expressed willingness to consider further measures under the United Nations Charter when dealing with situations of children in armed conflict.

Unlike Resolution 1261 on the same topic, Resolution 1314 established more targeted measures to protect children during and after conflict.

== Resolution ==
=== Observations ===
On 25 May 2000, the General Assembly adopted the Optional Protocol on the Involvement of Children in Armed Conflict. The Security Council underlined the need for all parties to comply with the principles of international law, including the principles contained in the United Nations Charter, Worst Forms of Child Labour Convention, Rome Statute of the International Criminal Court and Ottawa Treaty. Regional initiatives were also taking place.

=== Acts ===
The Security Council reaffirmed its condemnation of the deliberate targeting of children during armed conflict and the impact of such conflict on children. It was the responsibility of all states to end the impunity of those guilty of genocide, crimes against humanity and war crimes. All parties involved in armed conflict were urged to uphold international law, particularly with regard to the Geneva Conventions and Additional Protocols, United Nations Convention on the Rights of the Child and Optional Protocol.

Parties involved in conflict were called upon to provide protection and assistance to refugees and internally displaced persons, particularly women and children, and to facilitate the delivery of humanitarian aid. The Council expressed concern at connections between the illicit trade in natural resources and armed conflict, and illegal arms trafficking and armed conflict; in this regard, it announced its intention to consider further measures. The deliberate targeting of civilians, including children, constituted a violation of international humanitarian and human rights law.

The resolution called for provisions to protect children including the disarmament, demobilisation and reintegration of child soldiers and inclusion of child protection advisers in peacekeeping operations. Special importance was needed towards the vulnerabilities of girls affected by conflict. The Council reiterated its position that children should have access to basic services throughout conflict and post-conflict periods. It also indicated its willingness to consider unintended consequences on children of measures adopted under Article 41 of the United Nations Charter.

The Council welcomed initiatives by regional and subregional organisations to protect children in armed conflict, and were urged to:

(a) consider establishing child protection units;
(b) consider including child protection staff in their peace and field operations;
(c) undertake initiatives to end cross-border activities harmful to children;
(d) allocate resources for the benefit of children during armed conflict;
(e) include a gender perspective into all child protection policies and programmes;
(f) consider regional initiatives towards the full implementation of the prohibition of child soldiers.

All countries were urged to seek the release of abducted children and encourage the involvement of young people in peace initiatives. Finally, Secretary-General Kofi Annan was requested to continue his reports and submit a report on the implementation of the current resolution and Resolution 1261 by 31 July 2000.

== See also ==
- List of international instruments relevant to the worst forms of child labour
- List of United Nations Security Council Resolutions 1301 to 1400 (2000–2002)
