= United Nations Security Council Resolution 1279 =

UN Security Council Resolution 1279
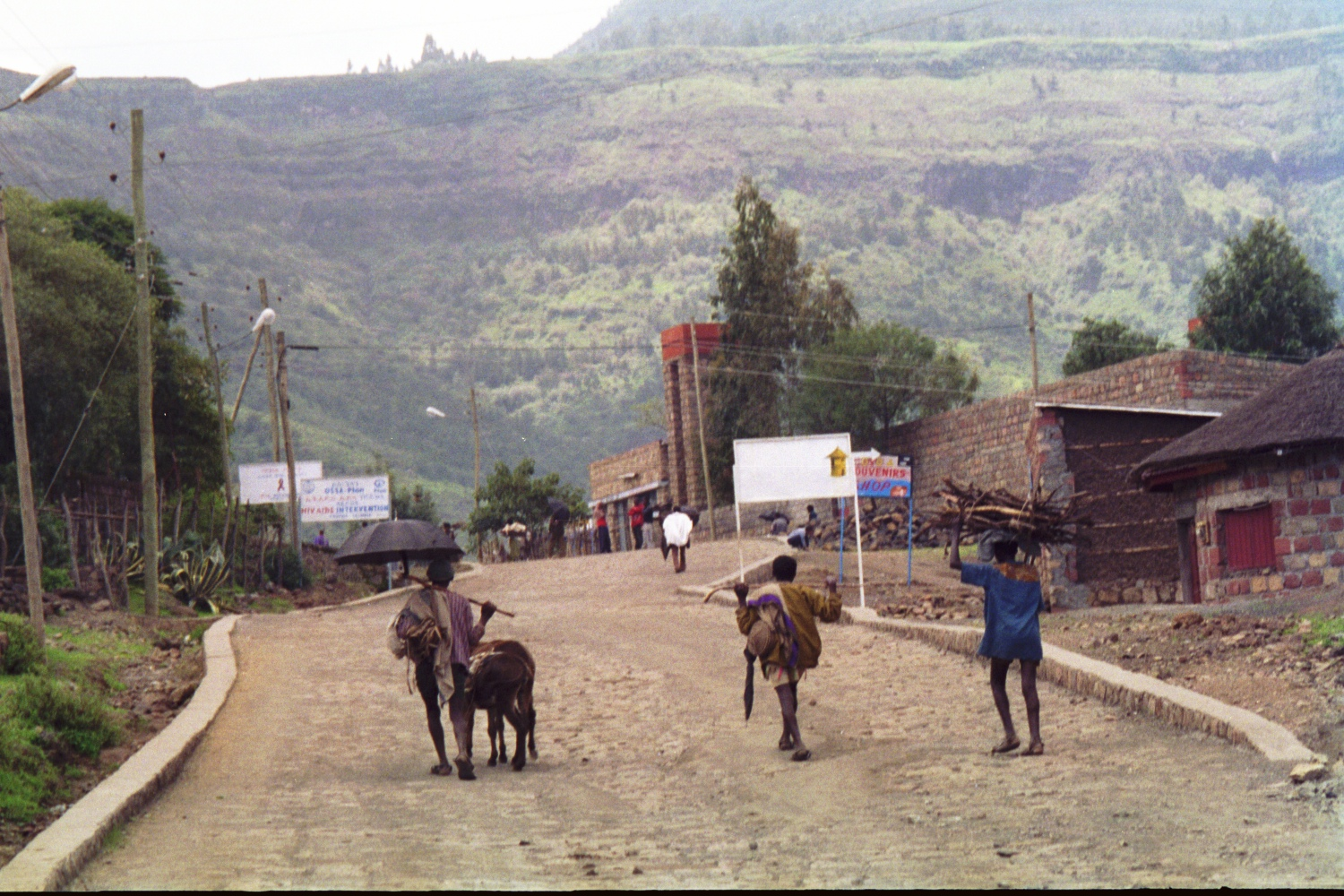
- Refugee camp in eastern Democratic Republic of the Congo
- Date: 30 November 1999
- Meeting no.: 4,076
- Code: S/RES/1279 (Document)
- Subject: The situation concerning the Democratic Republic of the Congo
- Voting summary: 15 voted for; None voted against; None abstained
- Result: Adopted

Security Council composition
- Permanent members: China; France; Russia; United Kingdom; United States
- Non-permanent members: Argentina; Bahrain; Brazil; Canada; Gabon; Gambia; Malaysia; Namibia; Netherlands; Slovenia

United Nations Security Council resolution 1279, adopted unanimously on 30 November 1999, after recalling resolutions 1234 (1999), 1258 (1999) and 1273 (1999) on situation in the Democratic Republic of the Congo, the council established the United Nations Mission in the Democratic Republic of Congo (MONUC) for an initial period until 1 March 2000.

The security council reaffirmed that the Lusaka Ceasefire Agreement represented the most favourable basis for a resolution of the conflict in the Democratic Republic of the Congo. There was concern about violations of the ceasefire, the deteriorating humanitarian situation and the violation of international humanitarian and human rights in the Democratic Republic of the Congo, particularly in the east of the country.

All parties were called upon to end hostilities and fully implement the Ceasefire Agreement signed in Lusaka. The council stressed that there must be a dialogue where all Congolese were able to participate, organised by the Organisation of African Unity (OAU). The Secretary-General Kofi Annan had appointed a Special Representative to lead the United Nations presence in the subregion.

It was decided that MONUC would have the following tasks as part of its mandate:

(a) establish contact with the signatories to the Ceasefire Agreement;
(b) liaise with the Joint Military Commission, provide technical assistance and investigate ceasefire violations;
(c) provide information on security conditions;
(d) prepare for the observation of the ceasefire and disengagement of forces;
(e) maintain contacts with signatories of the Ceasefire Agreement, facilitate the delivery of humanitarian aid and protect human rights.

Finally, the secretary-general was asked to report on the situation in the Democratic Republic of the Congo including conditions for the future deployment of United Nations personnel, and was requested to take immediate steps to equip 500 military observers for rapid deployments authorised by the council.

== See also ==
- List of United Nations Security Council Resolutions 1201 to 1300 (1998–2000)
- Second Congo War
