= List of international instruments relevant to the worst forms of child labour =

Instruments defining worst forms of child labour (WFCL) and containing substantive provisions on all WFCL:

- International Labour Organization
  - Worst Forms of Child Labour Convention: Definitions, and main provisions, binding states that have ratified the convention
  - Worst Forms of Child Labour Recommendation: Recommendation supplementing the Worst Forms of Child Labour Convention, but not binding on ratifying states

== Instruments containing substantive provisions on a number of WFCL ==
- United Nations Convention on the Rights of the Child (although not using the term worst forms of child labour, since this was first coined in an international instrument in the Worst Forms of Child Labour Convention)

== Military use of children ==
- Optional protocol on the involvement of children in armed conflict in terms of the Convention on the Rights of the Child
- United Nations Security Council Resolution 1261

== Trafficking in children and child abduction ==
- 1921 International Convention for the Suppression of the Traffic in Women and Children (1921)
- Convention for the Suppression of the Traffic in Persons and the Exploitation of the Prostitution of Others (1949)
- African Charter on the Rights and Welfare of the Child (1990)
- Hague Convention on the Civil Aspects of International Child Abduction (1996)
- Optional Protocol to the Convention on the Rights of the Child on the Sale of Children, Child Prostitution and Child Pornography (2000)
- Protocol to Prevent, Suppress and Punish Trafficking in Persons, especially Women and Children, supplementing the Convention against Transnational Organised Crime (2000)

== Commercial sexual exploitation of children ==
The most comprehensive international instrument focusing on Commercial sexual exploitation of children (CSEC) is the Optional Protocol to the Convention on the Rights of the Child on the Sale of Children, Child Prostitution and Child Pornography (2000)

Other instruments are (in chronological order)

- Convention for the Suppression of the Traffic in Persons and the Exploitation of the Prostitution of Others (1949)
- African Charter on the Rights and Welfare of the Child (1990)
- Hague Convention on the Civil Aspects of International Child Abduction (1996)
- Stockholm Declaration and Agenda for Action (1996)
- Protocol to Prevent, Suppress and Punish Trafficking in Persons, especially Women and Children, supplementing the Convention against Transnational Organised Crime (2000)
- Budapest Convention on Cybercrime (2001) of the Council of Europe
- Council of Europe Convention on the Protection of Children against Sexual Exploitation and Sexual Abuse (2007)
- Global Code of Ethics for Tourism

== See also ==
- Timeline of children's rights in the United Kingdom
- Timeline of children's rights in the United States
