= United Nations Security Council Resolution 1273 =

UN Security Council Resolution 1273
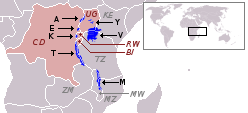
- African Great Lakes region
- Date: 5 November 1999
- Meeting no.: 4,060
- Code: S/RES/1273 (Document)
- Subject: The situation concerning the Democratic Republic of the Congo
- Voting summary: 15 voted for; None voted against; None abstained
- Result: Adopted

Security Council composition
- Permanent members: China; France; Russia; United Kingdom; United States
- Non-permanent members: Argentina; Bahrain; Brazil; Canada; Gabon; Gambia; Malaysia; Namibia; Netherlands; Slovenia

United Nations Security Council resolution 1273, adopted unanimously on 5 November 1999, after reaffirming resolutions 1234 (1999) and 1258 (1999) on situation in the Democratic Republic of the Congo, the Council extended the deployment of the 90 military liaison personnel as part of efforts to assist the peace process in the country until 15 January 2000.

The Security Council reaffirmed the Lusaka Ceasefire Agreement that represented a resolution to the conflict in the Democratic Republic of the Congo. It noted the deployment of United Nations military liaison personnel to the capitals of the signatories of the Ceasefire Agreement signed in Lusaka. All parties were urged to co-operate with the technical survey team dispatched to the Democratic Republic of the Congo to assess conditions for the deployment of a United Nations deployment in the country.

After extending the mandate of the military liaison personnel, the Council requested the Secretary-General Kofi Annan to report on developments in the Democratic Republic of the Congo and on the future presence of the United Nations in the country. Finally, all concerned parties were urged to continue to abide by the provisions of the Ceasefire Agreement.

== See also ==
- List of United Nations Security Council Resolutions 1201 to 1300 (1998–2000)
- Second Congo War
- United Nations Mission in the Democratic Republic of Congo
