= United Nations Security Council Resolution 1265 =

UN Security Council Resolution 1265
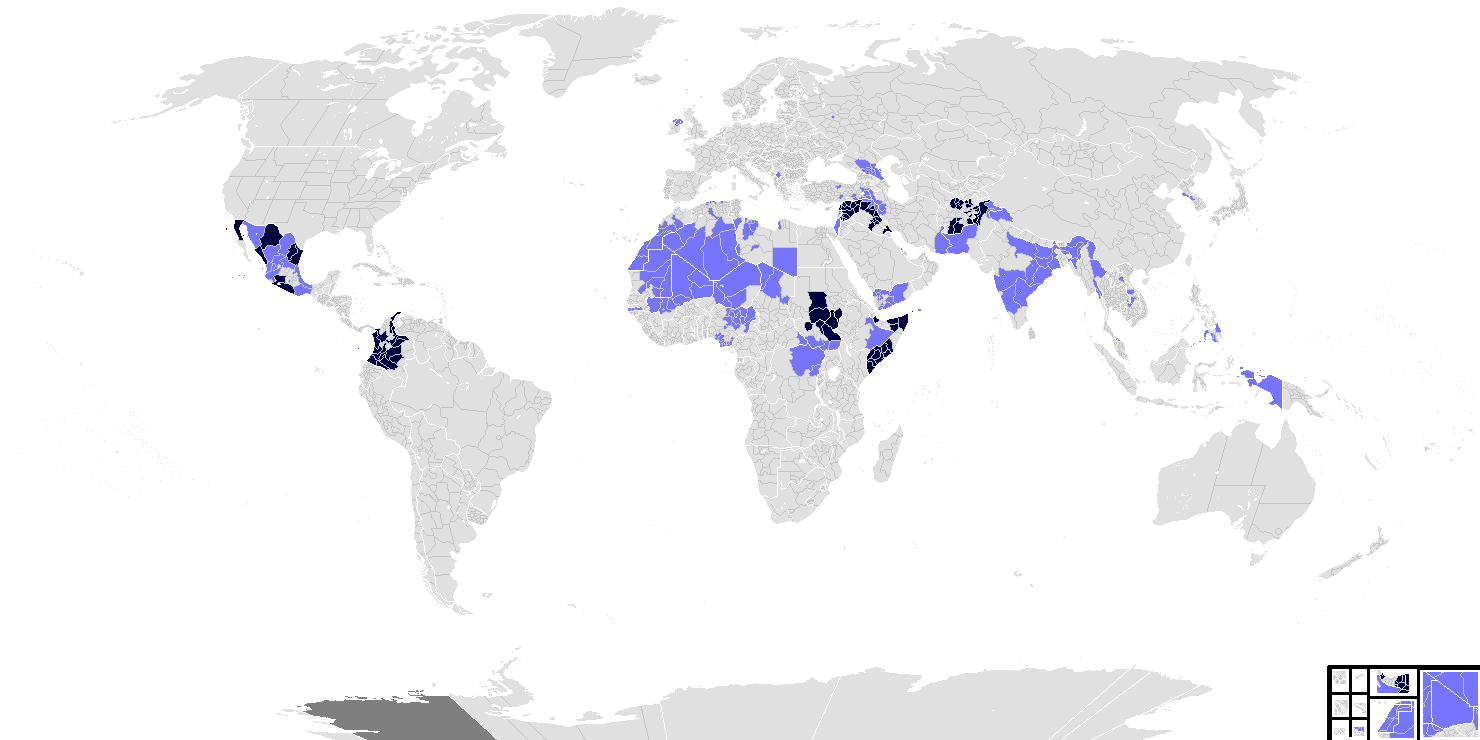
- Ongoing conflicts around the world
- Date: 17 September 1999
- Meeting no.: 4,046
- Code: S/RES/1265 (Document)
- Subject: Protection of civilians in armed conflict
- Voting summary: 15 voted for; None voted against; None abstained
- Result: Adopted

Security Council composition
- Permanent members: China; France; Russia; United Kingdom; United States
- Non-permanent members: Argentina; Bahrain; Brazil; Canada; Gabon; Gambia; Malaysia; Namibia; Netherlands; Slovenia

United Nations Security Council resolution 1265, adopted unanimously on 17 September 1999, in the first resolution to address the topic, the council discussed the protection of civilians during armed conflict.

== Resolution ==
=== Observations ===
The security council noted reports from the Secretary-General Kofi Annan concerning the situation in Africa and the protection of civilians in armed conflict. Civilians accounted for the majority of victims in armed conflicts and had increasingly become targets of warring parties. Women, children, refugees and internally displaced persons were particularly the target of violence and this impaired lasting peace and reconciliation.

The council stressed the importance of addressing the issues driving armed conflict around the world and the protection of civilians through economic growth, eradication of poverty, sustainable development, national reconciliation, good governance, democracy, rule of law and respect for human rights. It expressed concern that, during armed conflict, there was little respect for international humanitarian, human rights and refugee law. Vulnerable groups, particularly children, also had specific rights and needs during armed conflicts, as noted in Resolution 1261 (1999) and women were also affected.

=== Acts ===
The security council condemned the intentional targeting of civilians during armed conflicts. All concerned parties were called upon to respect international humanitarian law, especially the Hague and Geneva Conventions. States that had not ratified international instruments were urged to do so and take steps to implement the instruments at a domestic level.

The importance of safe, secure and unhindered access with freedom of movement for international humanitarian agencies during armed conflict was underlined. The Convention on the Safety of United Nations and Associated Personnel of 1994 and the Convention on the Prohibition of the Use, Stockpiling, Production and Transfer of Anti-Personnel Mines and on their Destruction (Ottawa Treaty) of 1997 had come into force and the Council recalled the benefit this would have on civilians in armed conflict. The training of staff and presence of civilian police in peacekeeping operations was stressed, while the destabilising effect of the proliferation of weapons and ammunition was emphasised.

The resolution expressed willingness to examine how peacekeeping mandates addressed the harm of armed conflict on civilians and to respond to situations where civilians were deliberately targeted and humanitarian aid obstructed. The council would also work with international organisations such as the International Committee of the Red Cross and regional organisations to find ways to enhance civilian protection. Lastly, the council established a mechanism to review the recommendations contained in the report of the Secretary-General and announced that it would consider measures to be taken by April 2000.

== See also ==
- List of United Nations Security Council Resolutions 1201 to 1300 (1998–2000)
- List of ongoing armed conflicts
