= United Nations Security Council Resolution 1258 =

UN Security Council Resolution 1258
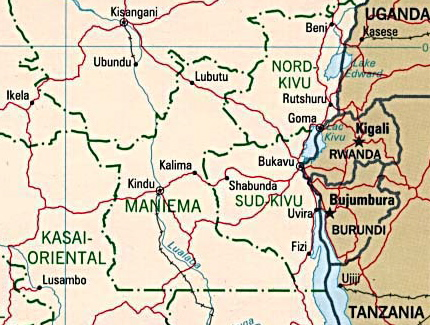
- Conflict zone in eastern Democratic Republic of the Congo
- Date: 6 August 1999
- Meeting no.: 4,032
- Code: S/RES/1258 (Document)
- Subject: The situation concerning the Democratic Republic of the Congo
- Voting summary: 15 voted for; None voted against; None abstained
- Result: Adopted

Security Council composition
- Permanent members: China; France; Russia; United Kingdom; United States
- Non-permanent members: Argentina; Bahrain; Brazil; Canada; Gabon; Gambia; Malaysia; Namibia; Netherlands; Slovenia

United Nations Security Council resolution 1258, adopted unanimously on 6 August 1999, after reaffirming Resolution 1234 (1999) on situation in the Democratic Republic of the Congo, the Council authorised the deployment of military liaison personnel to the capitals of the signatories of the Lusaka Ceasefire Agreement.

== Resolution ==
=== Observations ===
The Security Council was determined to resolve the serious humanitarian situation in the Democratic Republic of Congo to ensure that all refugees and displaced persons could return home safely. The current situation necessitated an urgent response from the parties of the conflict with the support of the international community.

=== Acts ===
The resolution welcomed the signing of the agreement in Lusaka as a basis for a resolution of the conflict in the Democratic Republic of the Congo. It also welcomed a ceasefire agreement by the Movement for the Liberation of Congo but was concerned that the Congolese Rally for Democracy had not yet signed the agreement. Furthermore, despite its signing, fighting was still occurring. The Organisation of African Unity (OAU) and Southern African Development Community (SADC) were commended for their efforts. All parties and rebel groups in particular were called upon to stop the fighting and implement the Ceasefire Agreement.

The Security Council authorised the deployment of 90 United Nations military liaison officers to the capitals of the countries that signed the Ceasefire Agreement, the rear headquarters of the main belligerents in the conflict and to the provisional headquarters of the joint military commission that was established as part of efforts to implement the agreement. It was decided that the liaison officers would have the following mandate for the next three months:

(a) establish contacts with the joint military commission and signatories to the ceasefire agreement
(b) develop modalities for implementing the ceasefire agreement
(c) provide technical assistance to the joint military commission
(d) provide information to the Secretary-General Kofi Annan regarding the situation on the ground and on a future United Nations presence in the country
(e) secure guarantees of security and co-operation from the Congolese parties

The Secretary-General had appointed a Special Representative to head the operation. All parties were urged to guarantee the safety and freedom of movement for United Nations and humanitarian personnel and the Secretary-General was requested to keep the Council regularly informed on developments in the region.

== See also ==
- List of United Nations Security Council Resolutions 1201 to 1300 (1998–2000)
- Second Congo War
