= United Nations Security Council Resolution 1296 =

United Nations Security Council resolution

UN Security Council Resolution 1296
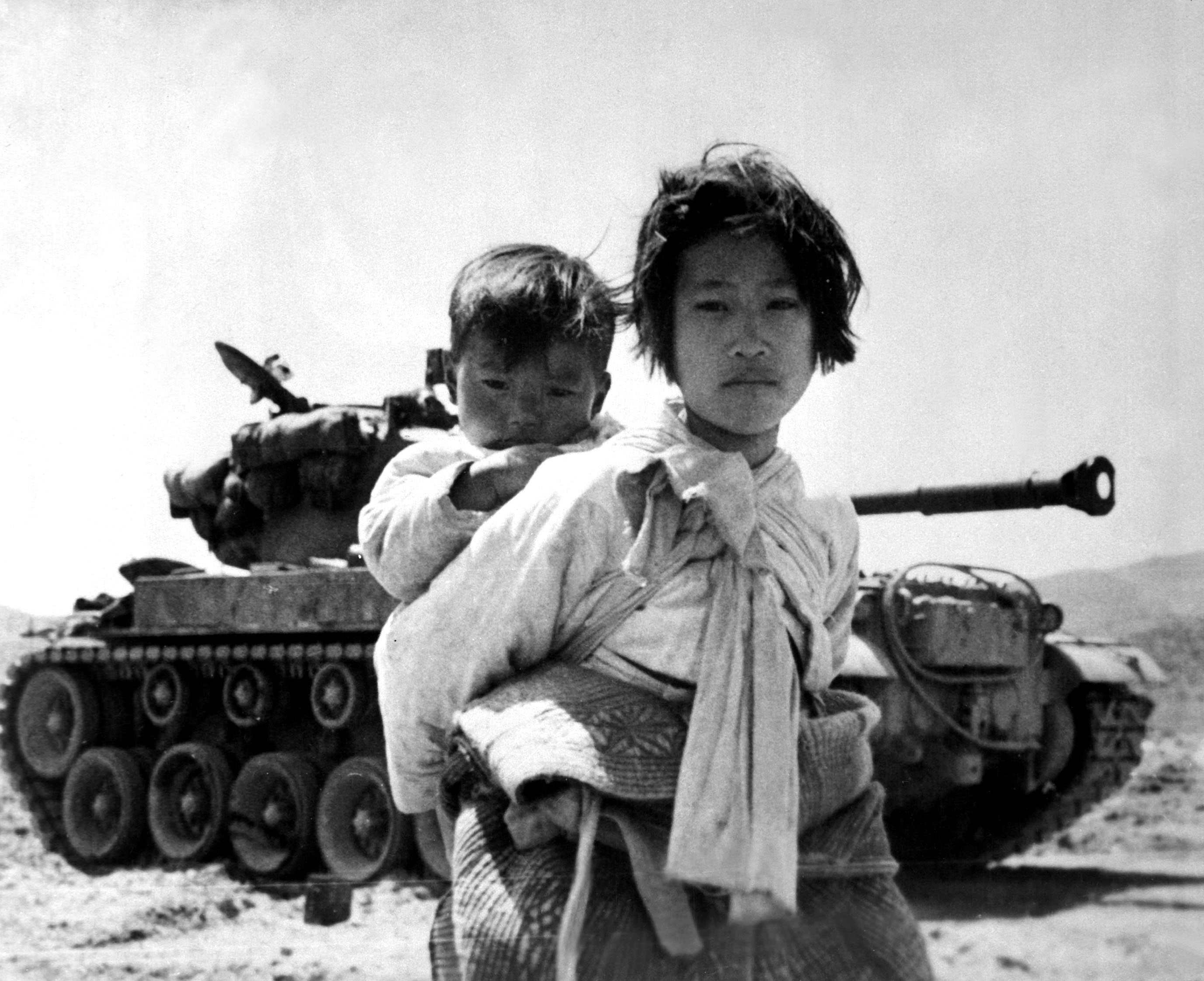
- Civilians during the Korean War
- Date: 19 April 2000
- Meeting no.: 4,130
- Code: S/RES/1296 (Document)
- Subject: Protection of civilians in armed conflict
- Voting summary: 15 voted for; None voted against; None abstained
- Result: Adopted

Security Council composition
- Permanent members: China; France; Russia; United Kingdom; United States
- Non-permanent members: Argentina; Bangladesh; Canada; Jamaica; Malaysia; Mali; Namibia; Netherlands; Tunisia; Ukraine

United Nations Security Council resolution 1296, adopted unanimously on 19 April 2000, after recalling Resolution 1265 (1999), the Council discussed steps to enhance the protection of civilians during armed conflict.

== Resolution ==
=== Observations ===
The Security Council regretted that the majority of victims of armed conflicts were civilians. There was concern in particular that vulnerable groups such as women, children, refugees and internally displaced persons were targeted. All parties involved were referred to the importance of compliance with the United Nations Charter and international law with regards to international humanitarian, human rights and refugee law.

=== Acts ===
The council strongly condemned deliberate attacks on civilians and emphasised the need to consider ways to best protect civilians. The majority of victims were internally displaced persons and vulnerable groups and therefore were afforded protection under international law. Systematic and widespread violations of international humanitarian and human rights law in situations of armed conflict could constitute a threat to international peace and security. It was important that civilians had access to humanitarian aid, and a denial of assistance constituted a violation of international law. At the same time, it was important that aid agencies remained neutral during conflict.

The resolution noted that the council would include measures for demobilisation, demilitarisation and reintegration of ex-combatants and child soldiers, disposal of weapons and ammunition, and resources for the protection of civilians in immediate danger. Such measures would include security zones or corridors to protect civilians and the facilitation of humanitarian assistance in instances of genocide, crimes against humanity and war crimes. The peacekeeping missions could also include a component for the dissemination of information on international law through mass media.

The security council also took note of the entry into force of the Ottawa Treaty in 1997 and the positive impact it would have on the safety of citizens. Furthermore, the destabilising effect of small arms was recognised with regard to prolonging conflicts and distribution of humanitarian aid. Finally, the Secretary-General Kofi Annan was asked to continue his work and submit a report by 30 March 2001 on the situation of civilians in armed conflict.

== See also ==
- List of United Nations Security Council Resolutions 1201 to 1300 (1998–2000)
- List of ongoing armed conflicts
