= United Nations Security Council Resolution 1261 =

UN Security Council Resolution 1261
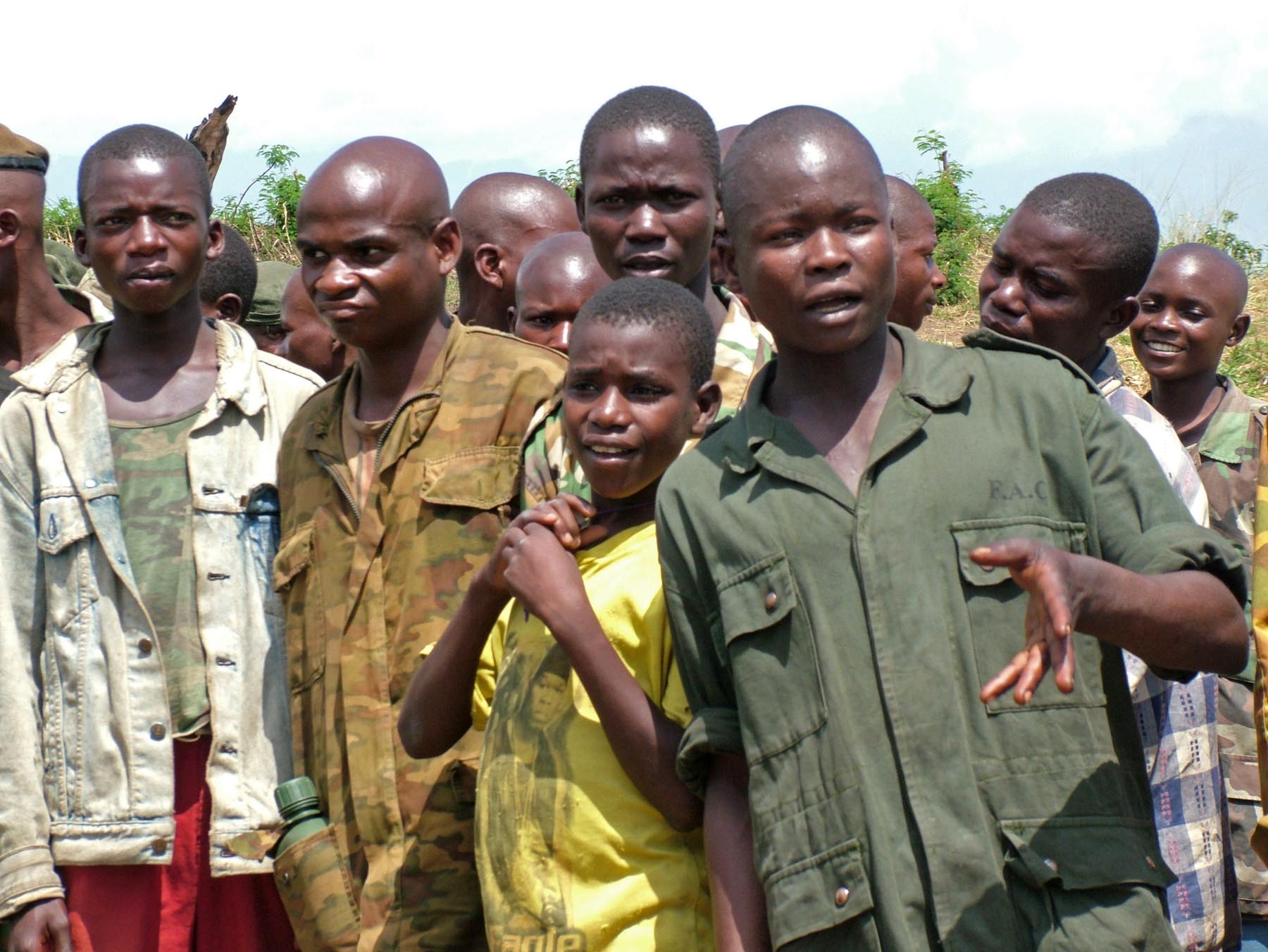
- Former child soldiers in the Democratic Republic of the Congo
- Date: 25 August 1999
- Meeting no.: 4,037
- Code: S/RES/1261 (Document)
- Subject: Children and armed conflict
- Voting summary: 15 voted for; None voted against; None abstained
- Result: Adopted

Security Council composition
- Permanent members: China; France; Russia; United Kingdom; United States
- Non-permanent members: Argentina; Bahrain; Brazil; Canada; Gabon; Gambia; Malaysia; Namibia; Netherlands; Slovenia

United Nations Security Council resolution 1261, adopted unanimously on 25 August 1999, in the first resolution to address the topic, the Council condemned the targeting of children in armed conflict including the recruitment and use of child soldiers.

The security council was informed prior to the adoption of the resolution that 300,000 children from the age of seven or eight were serving as soldiers, guerrillas or supporting roles in armed conflicts in more than 30 countries around the world. It was also told that wars within the past decade, armed conflicts had killed 2 million children.

== Resolution ==
=== Observations ===
The preamble of the resolution noted recent efforts to bring to an end the use of child soldiers in violation of international law, including the Worst Forms of Child Labour Convention and the Rome Statute of the International Criminal Court which prohibits forced conscription of children under the age of fifteen in armed forces or the participation in war crimes.

=== Acts ===
The security council expressed concern at the effect of armed conflict on children and the long-term effects on peace, security and development. It strongly condemned the targeting of children in conflict via murder, mutilation, sexual violence, abduction, displacement or use in the military. All concerned parties were called upon to comply with their obligations under international law, in particular the Geneva Conventions and the Convention on the Rights of the Child and violators and bring violators to justice. The parties were also urged to ensure the protection of children (particularly with respect to gender-based violence) and to take their welfare and rights seriously during peace negotiations and additionally to facilitate the delivery of humanitarian aid to children.

The council supported the efforts of the United Nations Children's Fund (UNICEF), United Nations High Commissioner for Refugees (UNHCR), United Nations Commission on Human Rights and Special Representative of the Secretary-General for Children and Armed Conflict. It underlined the importance of the safety, security and freedom of movement for United Nations and humanitarian personnel and urged all countries and the United Nations system to ensure an end to the recruitment and use of children in armed conflict through political efforts and the demilitarisation, demobilisation, rehabilitation and reintegration of child soldiers. The council recalled the provisions of Resolution 1209 (1998) concerning the effects of the proliferation of arms on vulnerable groups, particularly children and in this regard reminded states to restrict arms transfers that would provoke or prolong conflict.

The resolution reaffirmed the Security Council's readiness when dealing with situation of children in armed conflict to:

(a) ensure the provision of humanitarian assistance to the civilian population and taking into account the needs of children;
(b) support the protection and resettlement of displaced children through the UNHCR and others;
(c) consider the impact on children when adopting measures under Article 41 of the United Nations Charter concerning sanctions;
(d) consider appropriate responses when buildings or sites used by children were targeted in armed conflict.

Finally, the Secretary-General Kofi Annan was asked to ensure that United Nations personnel had appropriate training on the rights and welfare of children and to report to the council by 31 July 2000 on the implementation of the current resolution.

== See also ==
- List of international instruments relevant to the worst forms of child labour
- List of United Nations Security Council Resolutions 1201 to 1300 (1998–2000)
- Optional Protocol on the Involvement of Children in Armed Conflict
- United Nations Security Council Resolution 1314
