= United Nations Security Council Resolution 1234 =

UN Security Council Resolution 1234
- The Democratic Republic of the Congo
- Date: 9 April 1999
- Meeting no.: 3,993
- Code: S/RES/1234 (Document)
- Subject: The situation concerning the Democratic Republic of the Congo
- Voting summary: 15 voted for; None voted against; None abstained
- Result: Adopted

Security Council composition
- Permanent members: China; France; Russia; United Kingdom; United States
- Non-permanent members: Argentina; Bahrain; Brazil; Canada; Gabon; Gambia; Malaysia; Namibia; Netherlands; Slovenia

United Nations Security Council resolution 1234, adopted unanimously on 9 April 1999, after expressing concern at the situation in the Democratic Republic of the Congo, the Council demanded an immediate halt to hostilities in the region, a withdrawal of foreign forces and the re-establishment of the government's authority.

== Background ==
The Second Congo War emerged after a series of conflicts in the Great Lakes region in Africa. The aftermath of the genocide in Rwanda and civil war in Burundi had resulted in a large-scale refugee crisis. Armed groups were conducting raids into Rwanda from the Democratic Republic of the Congo, which ignited a series of ethnic conflicts amongst other factions in the east of the country between many armed groups and militia. The unstable political situation in the Democratic Republic of Congo (formerly Zaire) further contributed to the conflict and as many as eight African countries became involved in what was known as "Africa's World War".

== Resolution ==
=== Observations ===
The Security Council was concerned at measures taken by forces opposing the Government of the Democratic Republic of the Congo in the east of the country, including violations of human rights and international humanitarian law, and incitement to ethnic hatred and violence by all parties. There were also illicit flows of arms and materiel in the Great Lakes region. It recalled the right of self-defense in accordance with the United Nations Charter and welcomed the appointment of a Special Envoy, Moustapha Niasse, to the region by the Secretary-General. Finally, it determined that the situation in the Democratic Republic of the Congo was a threat to peace and stability in the region.

=== Acts ===
All countries had to observe the territorial integrity, independence and sovereignty of all countries in the region. The Security Council deplored the fighting and the presence of foreign troops, demanding that the fighting cease immediately. It called for the signing of a ceasefire agreement which would withdraw foreign troops from the Democratic Republic of the Congo, restore the authority of the central government and begin the peace process. All parties were reminded of their obligations under the Geneva Conventions of 1949 and the Convention on the Prevention and Punishment of the Crime of Genocide.

The Security Council condemned the massacres that had occurred and called for an international inquiry into such incidents, particularly those in South Kivu. Activities by armed groups, such as the Interahamwe and Rassemblement Démocratique pour le Rwanda were also condemned. It welcomed the announcement of all parties to stop fighting to allow a large-scale immunisation campaign and called upon all to provide better protection to children during the conflict.

Addressing peace efforts, the resolution supported mediation efforts by the Organisation of African Unity (OAU) and Southern African Development Community. It reaffirmed the importance of holding an international conference on peace, security and stability in the African Great Lakes region under the auspices of the United Nations and OAU. Meanwhile, the United Nations was actively considering its role in facilitating a ceasefire agreement and initiating the peace process.

== See also ==
- Lusaka Ceasefire Agreement
- List of United Nations Security Council Resolutions 1201 to 1300 (1998–2000)
