= United Nations Security Council Resolution 1370 =

UN Security Council Resolution 1370
- Location of Sierra Leone
- Date: 18 September 2001
- Meeting no.: 4,374
- Code: S/RES/1370 (Document)
- Subject: The situation in Sierra Leone
- Voting summary: 15 voted for; None voted against; None abstained
- Result: Adopted

Security Council composition
- Permanent members: China; France; Russia; United Kingdom; United States
- Non-permanent members: Bangladesh; Colombia; Ireland; Jamaica; Mali; Mauritius; Norway; Singapore; Tunisia; Ukraine

United Nations Security Council resolution 1370, adopted unanimously on 18 September 2001, after recalling resolutions 1270 (1999), 1289 (2000), 1313 (2000), 1317 (2000), 1321 (2000) and 1346 (2001) on the situation in Sierra Leone, the Council extended the mandate of the United Nations Mission in Sierra Leone (UNAMSIL) for a period of six months until 31 March 2002, beginning from 30 September 2001.

== Resolution ==
=== Observations ===
The Security Council expressed concern at the fragile security situation in the Mano River region, particularly the fighting in Liberia and the consequences on the civilian population. It recognised the importance of the extension of state authority, respect for human rights, political dialogue, the transformation of the Revolutionary United Front (RUF) into a political party and the holding of free and fair elections.

=== Acts ===
The mandate of UNAMSIL was extended and assistance provided by troop-contributing countries to the mission was welcomed. There was concern at human rights violations by the RUF, Civil Defence Forces and other armed groups as well as the lack of implementation of the Abuja Ceasefire Agreement. UNAMSIL was requested to assist in the return of refugees and internally displaced persons. The RUF in particular was urged to fulfill its obligations under the Ceasefire Agreement.

The parties in Sierra Leone were urged to intensify efforts to implement the Abuja Ceasefire Agreement and the resume the peace process. The Council supported efforts by the Economic Community of West African States (ECOWAS) to a resolution of the crisis in the Mano River Union region and emphasised the development and extension of administrative capacities of Sierra Leone were essential towards sustainable peace and development. The Government of Sierra Leone was urged to work in conjunction with the Secretary-General Kofi Annan, United Nations High Commissioner for Human Rights and others towards the establishment of a Truth and Reconciliation Commission and Special Court as envisaged in Resolution 1315 (2000).

Finally, the resolution welcomed the Secretary-General's intention to keep the Council informed on all aspects of the situation in Sierra Leone and make additional recommendations on the future of UNAMSIL and preparations for free and fair elections.

== See also ==
- List of United Nations Security Council Resolutions 1301 to 1400 (2000–2002)
- Sierra Leone Civil War
- Special Court for Sierra Leone
