= United Nations Security Council Resolution 1334 =

UN Security Council Resolution 1334
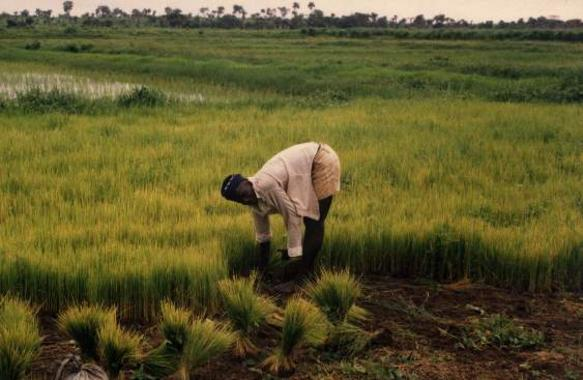
- Rice farming in Sierra Leone
- Date: 22 December 2000
- Meeting no.: 4,253
- Code: S/RES/1334 (Document)
- Subject: The situation in Sierra Leone
- Voting summary: 15 voted for; None voted against; None abstained
- Result: Adopted

Security Council composition
- Permanent members: China; France; Russia; United Kingdom; United States
- Non-permanent members: Argentina; Bangladesh; Canada; Jamaica; Malaysia; Mali; Namibia; Netherlands; Tunisia; Ukraine

United Nations Security Council resolution 1334, adopted unanimously on 22 December 2000, after recalling resolutions 1270 (1999), 1289 (1999), 1313 (2000), 1317 (2000) and 1321 (2000) on the situation in Sierra Leone, the Council extended the mandate of the United Nations Mission in Sierra Leone (UNAMSIL) until 31 March 2001. It was the final resolution adopted in 2000.

The security council expressed concern at the fragile situation in Sierra Leone. It noted the Abuja Agreement signed on 10 November 2000 in the Nigerian capital Abuja between the Government of Sierra Leone and Revolutionary United Front (RUF) and expressed concern that the latter had not met its obligations under the agreement.

The resolution recalled the main objectives of UNAMSIL were to extend state authority, restore law and order, stabilise the country and to contribute towards peace efforts through demilitarisation, demobilisation and reintegration programmes and therefore the mission needed to be strengthened. It welcomed efforts by the Secretary-General Kofi Annan to secure commitments of additional troops for UNAMSIL, calling on states to consider contributing peacekeeping forces. The council would promptly respond to recommendations made by the Secretary-General regarding the operation's strength and mandate.

== See also ==
- List of United Nations Security Council Resolutions 1301 to 1400 (2000–2002)
- Sierra Leone Civil War
- Special Court for Sierra Leone
