= United Nations Security Council Resolution 1389 =

UN Security Council Resolution 1389
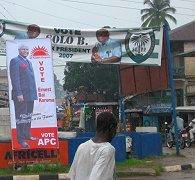
- Election posters in Sierra Leone
- Date: 16 January 2002
- Meeting no.: 4,451
- Code: S/RES/1389 (Document)
- Subject: The situation in Sierra Leone
- Voting summary: 15 voted for; None voted against; None abstained
- Result: Adopted

Security Council composition
- Permanent members: China; France; Russia; United Kingdom; United States
- Non-permanent members: Bulgaria; Cameroon; Colombia; Guinea; Ireland; Mauritius; Mexico; Norway; Singapore; Syria

United Nations Security Council resolution 1389, adopted unanimously on 16 January 2002, after recalling all previous resolutions on the situation in Sierra Leone, the council expanded the mandate of the United Nations Mission in Sierra Leone (UNAMSIL) to include wide-ranging provisions for supporting the May 2002 general elections.

In the preamble of the resolution, the security council welcomed significant progress made in the Sierra Leonean peace process and the completion of the disarmament process. It emphasised the importance of free and fair elections on the long-term stability of the country, and welcomed progress made by the Sierra Leonean government and National Electoral Commission in preparing for the elections.

In addition to Resolution 1270 (1999), the council decided that UNAMSIL would undertake election-related tasks. The tasks included assisting with logistic support to the National Electoral Commission through the transport of electoral materials and personnel; facilitating the free movement of people, goods and humanitarian assistance; and providing security. It reiterated that, in accordance with resolutions 1270 and 1289 (2000), UNAMSIL was authorised to take necessary action to during the course of its mandate. Meanwhile, the number of United Nations police in the country was increased to support the Sierra Leone Police and devise an electoral training programme for their personnel.

The resolution welcomed the temporary establishment of an electoral component in the UNAMSIL mission to co-ordinate electoral activities between the National Electoral Commission, Sierra Leonean government and other stakeholders. Furthermore, an electoral office would be established in each electoral region to monitor the process to determine if it met international standards. The council also appreciated the support offered by the Public Information Section of UNAMSIL to the National Electoral Commission and government and the creation of a public education and information strategy.

Finally, the council underlined the importance of free and fair elections in the country, and urged the international community to contribute to provide assistance in this regard.

== See also ==
- Elections in Sierra Leone
- List of United Nations Security Council Resolutions 1301 to 1400 (2000–2002)
- Sierra Leone Civil War
- Special Court for Sierra Leone
