= United Nations Security Council Resolution 1321 =

UN Security Council Resolution 1321
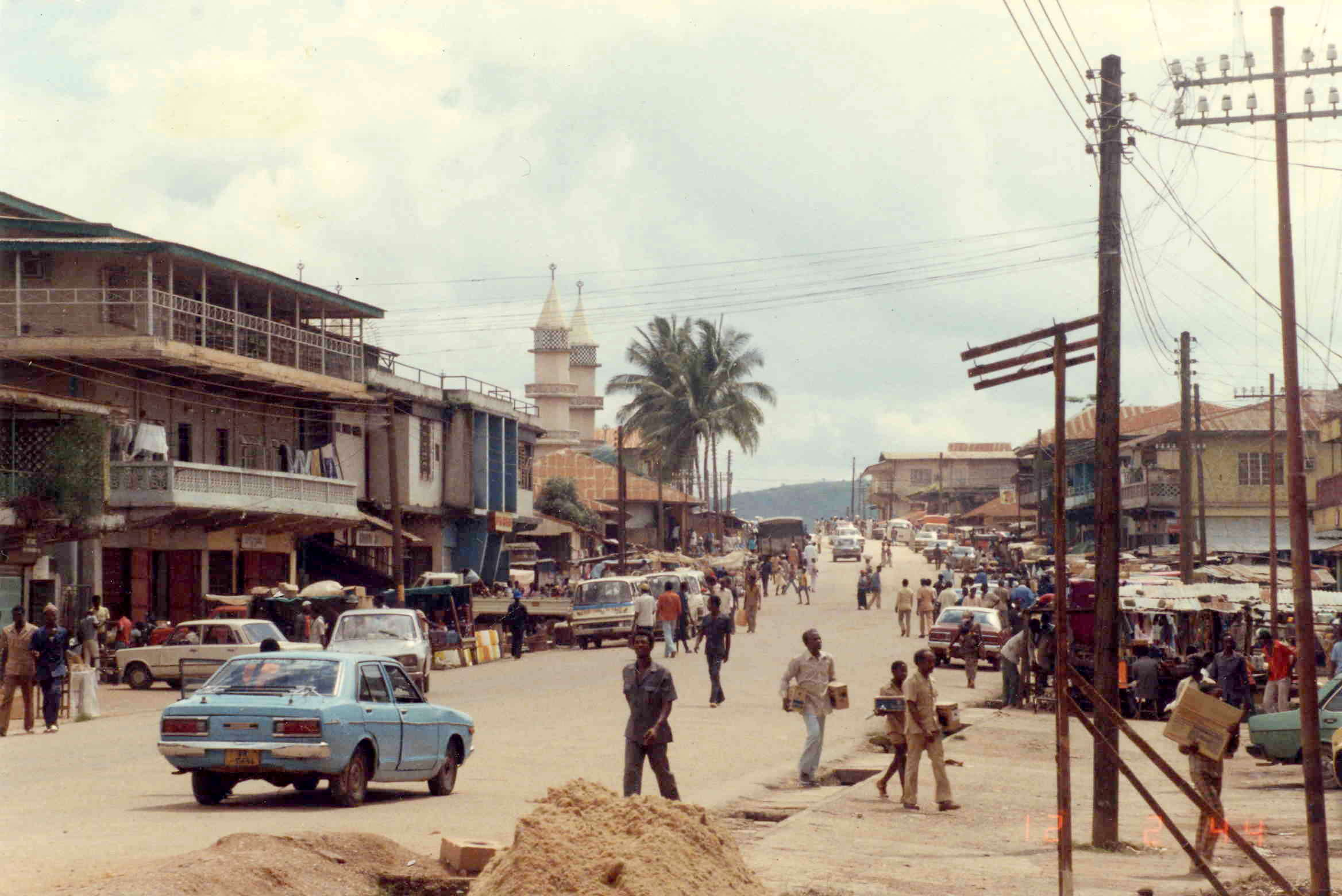
- Road in Sierra Leone
- Date: 20 September 2000
- Meeting no.: 4,199
- Code: S/RES/1321 (Document)
- Subject: The situation in Sierra Leone
- Voting summary: 15 voted for; None voted against; None abstained
- Result: Adopted

Security Council composition
- Permanent members: China; France; Russia; United Kingdom; United States
- Non-permanent members: Argentina; Bangladesh; Canada; Jamaica; Malaysia; Mali; Namibia; Netherlands; Tunisia; Ukraine

United Nations Security Council resolution 1321, adopted unanimously on 20 September 2000, after recalling resolutions 1270 (1999), 1289 (1999), 1313 (2000) and 1317 (2000) on the situation in Sierra Leone, the Council extended the mandate of the United Nations Mission in Sierra Leone (UNAMSIL) until 31 December 2000.

By extending UNAMSIL's mandate, the council also decided to review the situation by 31 October 2000. The Secretary-General Kofi Annan, in his sixth report on Sierra Leone, recommended a six-month extension to UNAMSIL's mandate and an increase in its military component to 20,500 and 260 military observers.

== See also ==
- List of United Nations Security Council Resolutions 1301 to 1400 (2000–2002)
- Sierra Leone Civil War
- Special Court for Sierra Leone
