= United Nations Security Council Resolution 1346 =

UN Security Council Resolution 1346
- Sierra Leone
- Date: 30 March 2001
- Meeting no.: 4,306
- Code: S/RES/1346 (Document)
- Subject: The situation in Sierra Leone
- Voting summary: 15 voted for; None voted against; None abstained
- Result: Adopted

Security Council composition
- Permanent members: China; France; Russia; United Kingdom; United States
- Non-permanent members: Bangladesh; Colombia; Ireland; Jamaica; Mali; Mauritius; Norway; Singapore; Tunisia; Ukraine

United Nations Security Council resolution 1346, adopted unanimously on 30 March 2001, after recalling previous resolutions on the situation in Sierra Leone, the Council extended the mandate of the United Nations Mission in Sierra Leone (UNAMSIL) for a further six months and increased the size of its military component.

The Security Council expressed concern at the fragile security situation in Sierra Leone and nearby countries, particularly the fighting at the border areas of Sierra Leone, Guinea and Liberia and the consequences on the civilian population. It recognised the importance of the extension of state authority, respect for human rights, political dialogue and the holding of free and fair elections.

The mandate of UNAMSIL was extended and its size increased to a 17,500 military personnel including 260 military observers, making it the largest United Nations peacekeeping operation at the time. The assistance provided by troop-contributing countries to UNAMSIL was welcomed and there was a revised concept of operations for UNAMSIL. There was concern at human rights violations by the Revolutionary United Front (RUF) and the lack of implementation of the Abuja Ceasefire Agreement. UNAMSIL was requested to assist in the return of refugees and internally displaced persons.

The parties in Sierra Leone were urged to intensify efforts to implement the Abuja Ceasefire Agreement and the resume the peace process. The Council supported efforts by the Economic Community of West African States (ECOWAS) to a resolution of the crisis in the Mano River Union region and emphasised the development and extension of administrative capacities of Sierra Leone were essential towards sustainable peace and development. The Government of Sierra Leone was urged to work in conjunction with the Secretary-General Kofi Annan, United Nations High Commissioner for Human Rights and others towards the establishment of a Truth and Reconciliation Commission and Special Court as envisaged in Resolution 1315 (2000).

Finally, the resolution welcomed the Secretary-General's intention to keep the Council informed on all aspects of the situation in Sierra Leone and make additional recommendations on the future of UNAMSIL and preparations for free and fair elections.

== See also ==
- List of United Nations Security Council Resolutions 1301 to 1400 (2000–2002)
- Sierra Leone Civil War
- Special Court for Sierra Leone
