= United Nations Security Council Resolution 1367 =

UN Security Council Resolution 1367
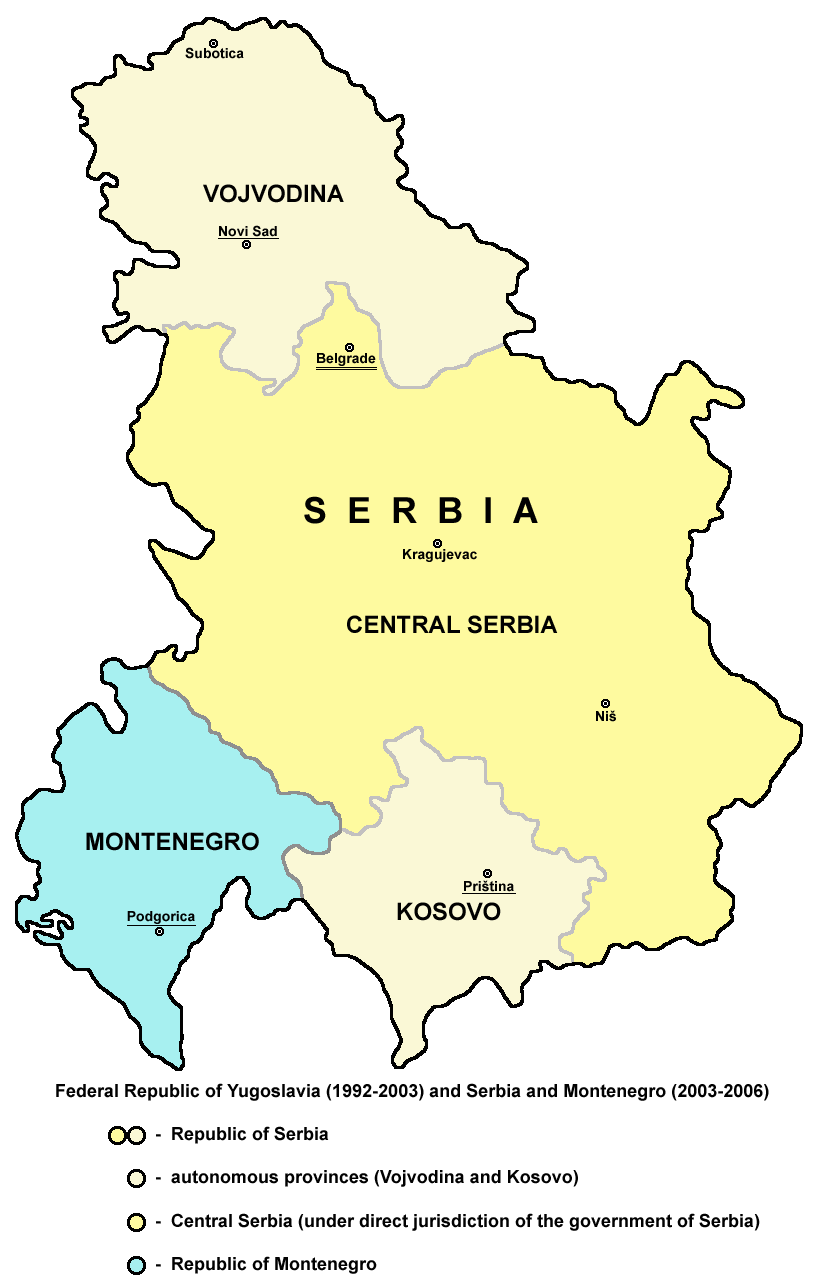
- Federal Republic of Yugoslavia
- Date: 10 September 2001
- Meeting no.: 4,366
- Code: S/RES/1367 (Document)
- Subject: The situation in Kosovo
- Voting summary: 15 voted for; None voted against; None abstained
- Result: Adopted

Security Council composition
- Permanent members: China; France; Russia; United Kingdom; United States
- Non-permanent members: Bangladesh; Colombia; Ireland; Jamaica; Mali; Mauritius; Norway; Singapore; Tunisia; Ukraine

United Nations Security Council resolution 1367, adopted unanimously on 10 September 2001, after recalling resolutions 1160 (1998), 1199 (1998), 1203 (1998) and reaffirming resolutions 1244 (1999) and 1345 (2001) in particular, the Council terminated the arms embargo against the Federal Republic of Yugoslavia (Serbia and Montenegro) after it had satisfied Council demands to withdraw from Kosovo and allow a political dialogue to begin.

The Security Council noted that demands contained in Resolution 1160 had been satisfied and further recognised the difficult security situation along the administrative boundary of Kosovo and the Federal Republic of Yugoslavia. Weapons and ammunition would continue to be prevented from entering Kosovo. The Secretary-General Kofi Annan stated that the Federal Republic of Yugoslavia had allowed humanitarian organisations and United Nations High Commissioner for Human Rights access to Kosovo.

Acting under Chapter VII of the United Nations Charter, the Council terminated the arms embargo and dissolved the Committee of Security Council tasked with monitoring the sanctions.

== See also ==
- Kosovo War – 1998–1999 armed conflict in the Balkans
- List of United Nations Security Council Resolutions 1301 to 1400 (2000–2002)
- Yugoslav Wars – 1991–2001 series of wars in the Balkans
