= United Nations Security Council Resolution 1331 =

UN Security Council Resolution 1331
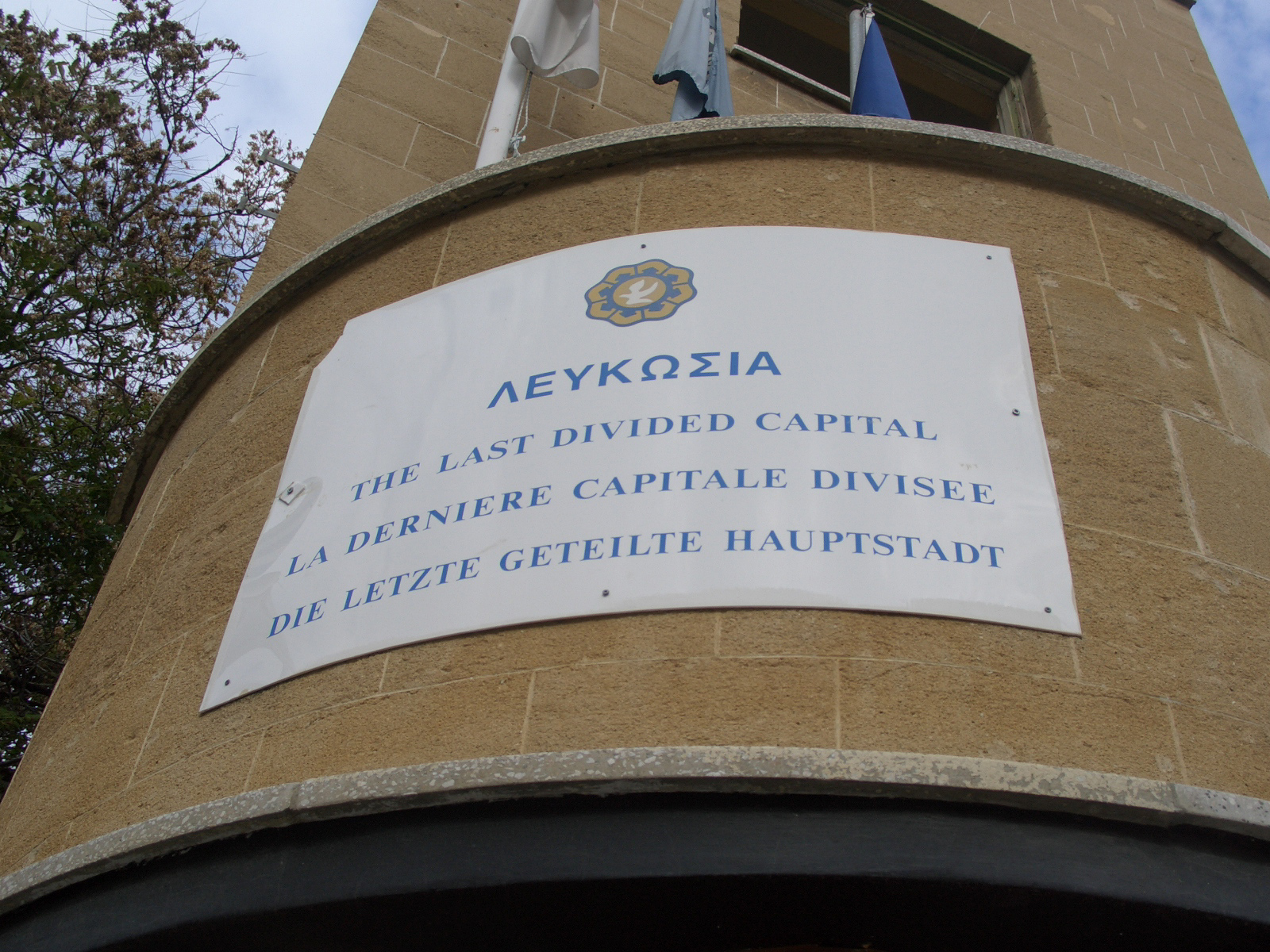
- Sign in Nicosia
- Date: 13 December 2000
- Meeting no.: 4,246
- Code: S/RES/1331 (Document)
- Subject: The situation in Cyprus
- Voting summary: 15 voted for; None voted against; None abstained
- Result: Adopted

Security Council composition
- Permanent members: China; France; Russia; United Kingdom; United States
- Non-permanent members: Argentina; Bangladesh; Canada; Jamaica; Malaysia; Mali; Namibia; Netherlands; Tunisia; Ukraine

United Nations Security Council resolution 1331, adopted unanimously on 13 December 2000, after reaffirming all resolutions on the situation in Cyprus, including Resolution 1251 (1999), the Council extended the mandate of the United Nations Peacekeeping Force in Cyprus (UNFICYP) for a further six months until 15 June 2001.

The security council noted the call within the Secretary-General Kofi Annan's report for the authorities in Cyprus and Northern Cyprus to urgently address the humanitarian situation concerning missing persons. The council also welcomed efforts to sensitise United Nations peacekeeping personnel towards the prevention and control of HIV/AIDS and other diseases.

Extending UNFICYP's mandate, the resolution requested the Secretary-General to report to the council by 1 June 2001 on the implementation of the current resolution. It also urged the Turkish Cypriot side to end restrictions imposed on 30 June 2000 on UNIFCYP operations and to restore the military status quo at Strovilia.

== See also ==
- Cyprus dispute
- List of United Nations Security Council Resolutions 1301 to 1400 (2000–2002)
- United Nations Buffer Zone in Cyprus
- Turkish Invasion of Cyprus
