= 1351 (disambiguation) =

1351 is a number in the 1000s number range.

1351 or variant, may also refer to:

- AD 1351 (MCCCLI), the 1351st year in the Common Era
- 1351 BC, the year before the common era
- 1351 Uzbekistania, asteroid #1351, the 1351st asteroid registered
- Commodore 1351, model 1351 computer mouse from Commodore Business Machines
- United Nations Security Council Resolution 1351

== See also ==
- B.1.351, a variant of COVID-19 virus SARS-CoV-2 first detected in South Africa
- 10.1351, DOI prefix for chemistry
