= United Nations Security Council Resolution 1392 =

UN Security Council Resolution 1392
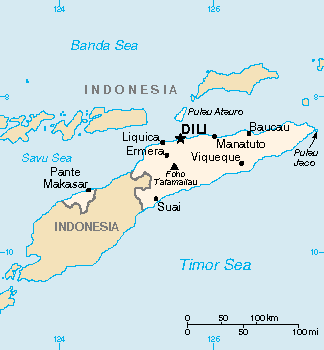
- East Timor
- Date: 31 January 2002
- Meeting no.: 4,463
- Code: S/RES/1392 (Document)
- Subject: The situation in East Timor
- Voting summary: 15 voted for; None voted against; None abstained
- Result: Adopted

Security Council composition
- Permanent members: China; France; Russia; United Kingdom; United States
- Non-permanent members: Bulgaria; Cameroon; Colombia; Guinea; Ireland; Mauritius; Mexico; Norway; Singapore; Syria

United Nations Security Council resolution 1392, adopted unanimously on 31 January 2002, after recalling previous resolutions on East Timor (Timor-Leste), particularly resolutions 1272 (1999) and 1338 (2001), the Council extended the mandate of the United Nations Transitional Administration in East Timor (UNTAET) until 20 May 2002.

The Security Council commended the work of UNTAET and the Special Representative of the Secretary-General in laying the foundations for the transition of East Timor to independence from Indonesia. It recalled an endorsement of the Constituent Assembly to declare independence on 20 May 2002. The Secretary-General Kofi Annan had recommended that the mandate be extended until independence was achieved and the Council awaited proposals from the Secretary-General for a successor United Nations mission post-independence.

UNTAET had been reducing its size due to the stabilisation of the situation in East Timor, and Resolution 1392 was the final time its mandate was extended before the establishment of the United Nations Mission of Support to East Timor.

== See also ==
- 1999 East Timorese crisis
- East Timor Special Autonomy Referendum
- Indonesian occupation of East Timor
- List of United Nations Security Council Resolutions 1301 to 1400 (2000–2002)
- United Nations Mission in East Timor
