= List of United Nations Security Council Resolutions 1301 to 1400 =

This is a list of United Nations Security Council Resolutions 1301 to 1400 adopted between 31 May 2000 and 28 March 2002.

| Resolution | Date | Vote | Concerns |
|---|---|---|---|
| 1301 | 31 May 2000 | 12–1–2 (against: Namibia; abstentions: Jamaica, Mali) | Extends mandate of the United Nations Mission for the Referendum in Western Sahara |
| 1302 | 8 June 2000 | 15–0–0 | Extends Oil-for-Food Programme in Iraq |
| 1303 | 14 June 2000 | 15–0–0 | Extends mandate of the United Nations Peacekeeping Force in Cyprus |
| 1304 | 16 June 2000 | 15–0–0 | Demands end to hostilities in the Second Congo War among Congolese, Rwandan and Ugandan forces |
| 1305 | 21 June 2000 | 14–0–1 (abstention: Russia) | Extends mandate of the Stabilisation Force and United Nations Mission in Bosnia and Herzegovina |
| 1306 | 5 July 2000 | 14–0–1 (abstention: Mali) | Imposes sanctions on rough diamonds from Sierra Leone |
| 1307 | 13 July 2000 | 15–0–0 | Extends mandate of the United Nations Mission of Observers in Prevlaka |
| 1308 | 17 July 2000 | 15–0–0 | Training on HIV/AIDS related issues in peacekeeping missions |
| 1309 | 25 July 2000 | 15–0–0 | Extends mandate of the United Nations Mission for the Referendum in Western Sahara |
| 1310 | 27 July 2000 | 15–0–0 | Extends mandate of the United Nations Interim Force in Lebanon |
| 1311 | 28 July 2000 | 15–0–0 | Extends mandate of the United Nations Observer Mission in Georgia |
| 1312 | 31 July 2000 | 15–0–0 | Establishes the United Nations Mission in Ethiopia and Eritrea |
| 1313 | 4 August 2000 | 15–0–0 | Extends mandate of the United Nations Mission in Sierra Leone |
| 1314 | 11 August 2000 | 15–0–0 | Children and armed conflict |
| 1315 | 14 August 2000 | 15–0–0 | Negotiations concerning the establishment of the Special Court for Sierra Leone |
| 1316 | 23 August 2000 | 15–0–0 | Extends mandate of the United Nations Mission in the Democratic Republic of the Congo |
| 1317 | 5 September 2000 | 15–0–0 | Extends mandate of the United Nations Mission in Sierra Leone |
| 1318 | 7 September 2000 | 15–0–0 | Declaration on effective role in the maintenance of international peace and security, particularly in Africa |
| 1319 | 8 September 2000 | 15–0–0 | Calls upon Indonesia to ensure security of refugees and United Nations staff in East Timor |
| 1320 | 15 September 2000 | 15–0–0 | Authorises deployment of troops and military observers as part of the United Nations Mission in Ethiopia and Eritrea |
| 1321 | 20 September 2000 | 15–0–0 | Extends mandate of the United Nations Mission in Sierra Leone |
| 1322 | 7 October 2000 | 14–0–1 (abstention: United States) | Events in Jerusalem and the Israeli-occupied territories |
| 1323 | 13 October 2000 | 15–0–0 | Extends mandate of the United Nations Mission in the Democratic Republic of the Congo |
| 1324 | 30 October 2000 | 15–0–0 | Extends mandate of the United Nations Mission for the Referendum in Western Sahara |
| 1325 | 31 October 2000 | 15–0–0 | Women and peace and security |
| 1326 | 31 October 2000 | Adopted without a vote | Admission of the Federal Republic of Yugoslavia to the United Nations |
| 1327 | 13 November 2000 | 15–0–0 | Implementation of the report of the Panel on United Nations Peace Operations |
| 1328 | 27 November 2000 | 15–0–0 | Extends mandate of the United Nations Disengagement Observer Force |
| 1329 | 30 November 2000 | 15–0–0 | Enlarges appeals chambers at the International Criminal Tribunal for the former Yugoslavia and International Criminal Tribunal for Rwanda |
| 1330 | 5 December 2000 | 15–0–0 | Extends Oil-for-Food Programme in Iraq |
| 1331 | 13 December 2000 | 15–0–0 | Extends mandate of the United Nations Peacekeeping Force in Cyprus |
| 1332 | 14 December 2000 | 15–0–0 | Extends mandate of the United Nations Mission in the Democratic Republic of the Congo |
| 1333 | 19 December 2000 | 13–0–2 (abstentions: China, Malaysia) | Mechanism on monitoring sanctions against the Taliban in Afghanistan |
| 1334 | 22 December 2000 | 15–0–0 | Extends mandate of the United Nations Mission in Sierra Leone |
| 1335 | 12 January 2001 | 15–0–0 | Extends mandate of the United Nations Mission of Observers in Prevlaka |
| 1336 | 23 January 2001 | 15–0–0 | Extends monitoring mechanism for sanctions against UNITA in Angola |
| 1337 | 30 January 2001 | 15–0–0 | Extends mandate of the United Nations Interim Force in Lebanon |
| 1338 | 31 January 2001 | 15–0–0 | Extends mandate of the United Nations Transitional Administration in East Timor |
| 1339 | 31 January 2001 | 15–0–0 | Extends mandate of the United Nations Observer Mission in Georgia |
| 1340 | 8 February 2001 | 15–0–0 | Nominations for judges at the International Criminal Tribunal for the former Yugoslavia |
| 1341 | 22 February 2001 | 15–0–0 | Demands disengagement and withdrawal plans in the Democratic Republic of the Congo |
| 1342 | 27 February 2001 | 15–0–0 | Extends mandate of the United Nations Mission for the Referendum in Western Sahara |
| 1343 | 7 March 2001 | 15–0–0 | Sanctions on Liberia for support of rebels in Sierra Leone |
| 1344 | 15 March 2001 | 15–0–0 | Extends mandate of the United Nations Mission in Ethiopia and Eritrea |
| 1345 | 21 March 2001 | 15–0–0 | Condemns extremist violence and terrorist activities in Macedonia, southern Serbia |
| 1346 | 30 March 2001 | 15–0–0 | Extends mandate of the United Nations Mission in Sierra Leone |
| 1347 | 30 March 2001 | 15–0–0 | Nominations for judges at the International Criminal Tribunal for Rwanda |
| 1348 | 19 April 2001 | 15–0–0 | Extends monitoring mechanism for sanctions against UNITA in Angola |
| 1349 | 27 April 2001 | 15–0–0 | Extends mandate of the United Nations Mission for the Referendum in Western Sahara |
| 1350 | 27 April 2001 | 15–0–0 | Nominations for judges at the International Criminal Tribunal for the former Yugoslavia |
| 1351 | 30 May 2001 | 15–0–0 | Extends mandate of the United Nations Disengagement Observer Force |
| 1352 | 1 June 2001 | 15–0–0 | Extends mandate of the Oil-for-Food Programme in Iraq |
| 1353 | 13 June 2001 | 15–0–0 | Strengthening co-operation with troop-contributing countries to peacekeeping missions |
| 1354 | 15 June 2001 | 15–0–0 | Extends mandate of the United Nations Peacekeeping Force in Cyprus |
| 1355 | 15 June 2001 | 15–0–0 | Extends mandate of the United Nations Mission in the Democratic Republic of Congo; Second Congo War |
| 1356 | 19 June 2001 | 15–0–0 | Exemptions under the arms embargo on Somalia |
| 1357 | 21 June 2001 | 15–0–0 | Extends mandate of the Stabilisation Force and United Nations Mission in Bosnia and Herzegovina |
| 1358 | 27 June 2001 | Adopted by acclamation | Recommends Kofi Annan as Secretary-General of the United Nations for a second term |
| 1359 | 29 June 2001 | 15–0–0 | Extends mandate of the United Nations Mission for the Referendum in Western Sahara |
| 1360 | 3 July 2001 | 15–0–0 | Extends Oil-for-Food Programme in Iraq |
| 1361 | 5 July 2001 | Adopted without a vote | Vacancy and election at the International Court of Justice |
| 1362 | 11 July 2001 | 15–0–0 | Extends mandate of the United Nations Mission of Observers in Prevlaka |
| 1363 | 30 July 2001 | 15–0–0 | Establishes monitoring mechanism for sanctions against the Taliban in Afghanistan |
| 1364 | 31 July 2001 | 15–0–0 | Extends mandate of the United Nations Observer Mission in Georgia |
| 1365 | 31 July 2001 | 15–0–0 | Extends mandate of the United Nations Interim Force in Lebanon |
| 1366 | 30 August 2001 | 15–0–0 | Inclusion of disarmament, demobilisation and reintegration components in peacekeeping operations |
| 1367 | 10 September 2001 | 15–0–0 | Terminates sanctions against the Federal Republic of Yugoslavia |
| 1368 | 12 September 2001 | 15–0–0 | Condemns September 11 attacks in the United States |
| 1369 | 14 September 2001 | 15–0–0 | Extends mandate of the United Nations Mission in Ethiopia and Eritrea |
| 1370 | 18 September 2001 | 15–0–0 | Extends mandate of the United Nations Mission in Sierra Leone |
| 1371 | 26 September 2001 | 15–0–0 | Calls for full implementation of Resolution 1345 in Macedonia |
| 1372 | 28 September 2001 | 14–0–1 (abstention: United States) | Terminates sanctions against Sudan |
| 1373 | 28 September 2001 | 15–0–0 | Counterterrorism |
| 1374 | 19 October 2001 | 15–0–0 | Extends monitoring mechanism for sanctions against UNITA in Angola |
| 1375 | 29 October 2001 | 15–0–0 | Establishes interim multinational security presence in Burundi |
| 1376 | 9 November 2001 | 15–0–0 | Launches third phase of the deployment of the United Nations Mission in the Democratic Republic of the Congo |
| 1377 | 12 November 2001 | 15–0–0 | Declaration on global efforts to combat terrorism |
| 1378 | 14 November 2001 | 15–0–0 | Expresses support for establishment of transitional administration leading to formation of a government in Afghanistan |
| 1379 | 20 November 2001 | 15–0–0 | Children and armed conflict |
| 1380 | 27 November 2001 | 15–0–0 | Extends mandate of the United Nations Mission for the Referendum in Western Sahara |
| 1381 | 27 November 2001 | 15–0–0 | Extends mandate of the United Nations Disengagement Observer Force |
| 1382 | 29 November 2001 | 15–0–0 | Extends Oil-for-Food Programme in Iraq |
| 1383 | 6 December 2001 | 15–0–0 | Endorses Bonn Agreement on Afghanistan |
| 1384 | 14 December 2001 | 15–0–0 | Extends mandate of the United Nations Peacekeeping Force in Cyprus |
| 1385 | 19 December 2001 | 15–0–0 | Extends sanctions against trade of blood diamonds in Sierra Leone |
| 1386 | 20 December 2001 | 15–0–0 | Establishes the International Security Assistance Force in Afghanistan |
| 1387 | 15 January 2002 | 15–0–0 | Extends mandate of the United Nations Mission of Observers in Prevlaka |
| 1388 | 15 January 2002 | 15–0–0 | Lifts sanctions against Ariana Afghan Airlines |
| 1389 | 16 January 2002 | 15–0–0 | Addition of election-related tasks to the mandate of the United Nations Mission in Sierra Leone |
| 1390 | 16 January 2002 | 15–0–0 | Continuation of sanctions against the Taliban and Al-Qaeda |
| 1391 | 28 January 2002 | 15–0–0 | Renews mandate of the United Nations Interim Force in Lebanon |
| 1392 | 31 January 2002 | 15–0–0 | Extends mandate of United Nations Transitional Administration in East Timor |
| 1393 | 31 January 2002 | 15–0–0 | Extends mandate of the United Nations Observer Mission in Georgia |
| 1394 | 27 February 2002 | 15–0–0 | Extends mandate of the United Nations Mission for the Referendum in Western Sahara |
| 1395 | 27 February 2002 | 15–0–0 | Re-establishes Panel of Experts to monitor sanctions against Liberia imposed in Resolution 1343 |
| 1396 | 5 March 2002 | 15–0–0 | Welcomes decision of the European Union to establish European Union Police Mission in Bosnia and Herzegovina |
| 1397 | 12 March 2002 | 14–0–1 (abstention: Syria) | Calls for end to hostilities in Second Intifada; two-state solution |
| 1398 | 15 March 2002 | 15–0–0 | Extends mandate of the United Nations Mission in Ethiopia and Eritrea |
| 1399 | 19 March 2002 | 15–0–0 | Condemns activities by the Rally for Congolese Democracy in the Democratic Republic of the Congo |
| 1400 | 28 March 2002 | 15–0–0 | Extends mandate of the United Nations Mission in Sierra Leone |

== See also ==
- Lists of United Nations Security Council resolutions
- List of United Nations Security Council Resolutions 1201 to 1300
- List of United Nations Security Council Resolutions 1401 to 1500
