= United Nations Security Council Resolution 1366 =

UN Security Council Resolution 1366
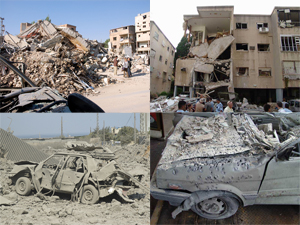
- Ruins from armed conflict
- Date: 30 August 2001
- Meeting no.: 4,360
- Code: S/RES/1366 (Document)
- Subject: The role of the Security Council in the prevention of armed conflicts
- Voting summary: 15 voted for; None voted against; None abstained
- Result: Adopted

Security Council composition
- Permanent members: China; France; Russia; United Kingdom; United States
- Non-permanent members: Bangladesh; Colombia; Ireland; Jamaica; Mali; Mauritius; Norway; Singapore; Tunisia; Ukraine

United Nations Security Council resolution 1366, adopted unanimously on 30 August 2001, after reaffirming resolutions 1196 (1998), 1197 (1998), 1208 (1998), 1265 (1999), 1296 (1999), 1318 (2000), 1325 (2000) and 1327 (2000) concerning aspects of armed conflict, the Council reiterated its aim to prevent armed conflict as part of its responsibility to maintain international peace and security.

== Resolution ==
=== Observations ===
The security council had considered a report of the Secretary-General Kofi Annan concerning the prevention of armed conflict and the role of the security council. It reaffirmed the principles enshrined in the United Nations Charter and was aware of the consequences of conflict on relations between countries and the humanitarian situation in the affected countries. The council stressed the underlining political, economic, humanitarian and moral advantages in preventing armed conflict.

It recognised the importance of addressing the root causes of armed conflict and the important role of the United Nations. There was concern at the destabilising effect of illicit arms trafficking and therefore it was important in raising awareness of international humanitarian law. The council also reiterated that preventive and post-conflict measures were part of a comprehensive conflict prevention strategy.

=== Acts ===
The resolution stressed that the primary responsibility for conflict prevention was upon national governments. According to the council, the success of a preventive strategy from the United Nations required support and consent of the government concerned. It expressed willingness to consider armed conflicts brought to the attention of the council by any Member State. All Member States were called upon to strengthen the capacity of the United Nations in the maintenance of international peace and security and provide resources towards conflict prevention. At the same time, it reaffirmed the importance of the peaceful settlement of conflicts in accordance with Chapter VI of the United Nations Charter.

The security council invited the secretary-general to refer cases of violations of international humanitarian law and potential conflict situations to the council. It stressed the importance of the inclusion of civilian police and disarmament, demobilisation and reintegration components within peacekeeping operations. The secretary-general was asked to pay greater attention to gender perspectives during peacekeeping mandates.

It supported the increased use of fact-finding and confidence-building missions to regions of conflict in developing regional prevention strategies. Greater emphasis was placed on conflict prevention in Africa by efforts through the Organisation of African Unity and Economic Community of West African States. The resolution concluded with the security council desiring to give further consideration to the Secretary-General's report on conflict prevention.

== See also ==
- Brahimi Report
- History of United Nations peacekeeping
- List of United Nations peacekeeping operations
- List of United Nations Security Council Resolutions 1301 to 1400 (2000–2002)
