= United Nations Security Council Resolution 1380 =

UN Security Council Resolution 1380
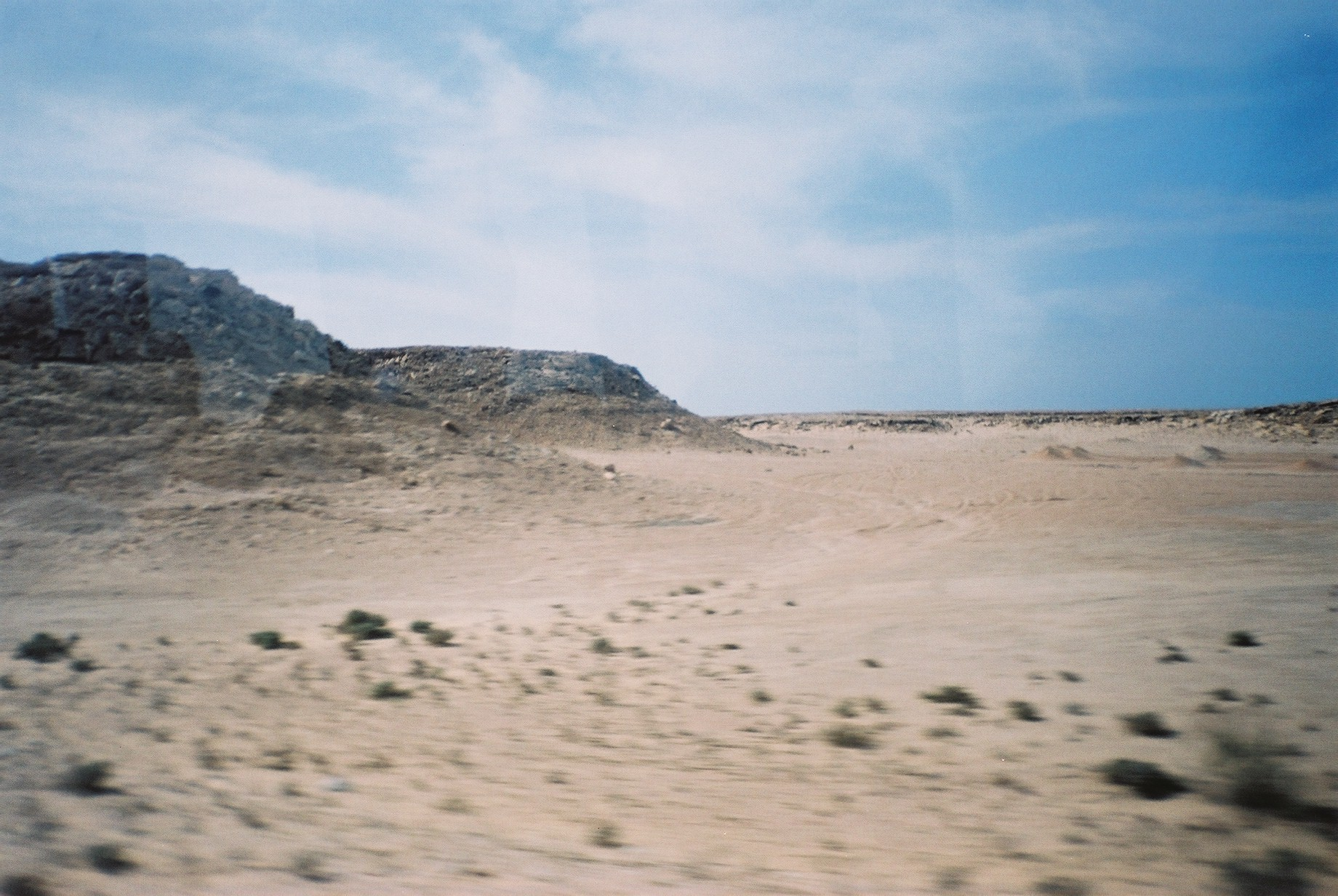
- Western Sahara desert
- Date: 27 November 2001
- Meeting no.: 4,427
- Code: S/RES/1380 (Document)
- Subject: The situation concerning Western Sahara
- Voting summary: 15 voted for; None voted against; None abstained
- Result: Adopted

Security Council composition
- Permanent members: China; France; Russia; United Kingdom; United States
- Non-permanent members: Bangladesh; Colombia; Ireland; Jamaica; Mali; Mauritius; Norway; Singapore; Tunisia; Ukraine

United Nations Security Council resolution 1380, adopted unanimously on 27 November 2001, after reaffirming all previous resolutions on Western Sahara, including Resolution 1359 (2001), the Council extended the mandate of the United Nations Mission for the Referendum in Western Sahara (MINURSO) until 28 February 2002.

MINURSO's mandate was extended to allow additional time for consultations on a settlement of the issue by James Baker with Morocco and the Polisario Front. The Secretary-General Kofi Annan was requested to inform the Council of significant developments by 15 January 2002 and to provide an assessment of the situation by 18 February 2002.

== See also ==
- Free Zone (region)
- Political status of Western Sahara
- List of United Nations Security Council Resolutions 1301 to 1400 (2000–2002)
- Sahrawi Arab Democratic Republic
- Moroccan Western Sahara Wall
