= United Nations Security Council Resolution 1371 =

UN Security Council Resolution 1371
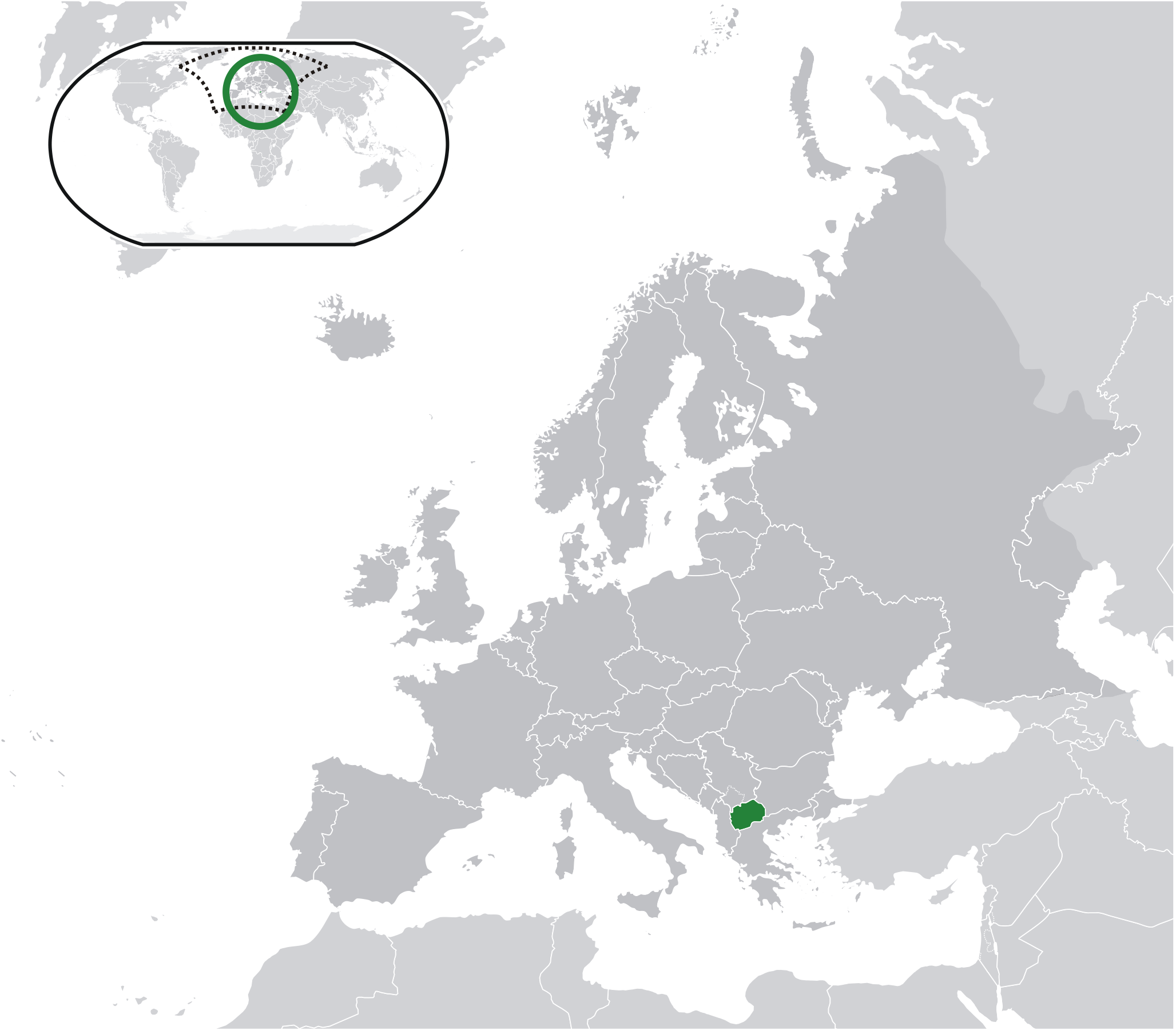
- Location of Macedonia in Europe
- Date: 26 September 2001
- Meeting no.: 4,381
- Code: S/RES/1371 (Document)
- Subject: The situation in The former Yugoslav Republic of Macedonia
- Voting summary: 15 voted for; None voted against; None abstained
- Result: Adopted

Security Council composition
- Permanent members: China; France; Russia; United Kingdom; United States
- Non-permanent members: Bangladesh; Colombia; Ireland; Jamaica; Mali; Mauritius; Norway; Singapore; Tunisia; Ukraine

United Nations Security Council resolution 1371, adopted unanimously on 26 September 2001, after reaffirming resolutions 1244 (1999) and 1345 (2001) on the situation in the former Yugoslavia including Macedonia, the Council called for the full implementation of its Resolution 1345 concerning violence and terrorist activities in Macedonia and southern Serbia.

The Security Council welcomed steps taken by the Government of Macedonia to consolidate a multiethnic society within its borders. Furthermore, it also appreciated the Ohrid Agreement signed in the Macedonian capital Skopje in August 2001 between four political parties and President Boris Trajkovski. Efforts of the Macedonian government, the European Union, NATO and the Organization for Security and Co-operation in Europe (OSCE) to prevent the escalation of ethnic tensions and manage the security situation in the region were welcomed.

Calling for the full implementation of Resolution 1345, the Council reaffirmed the territorial integrity and sovereignty of Macedonia and other states in the region. It rejected the use of violence to further political goals and stressed that only peaceful political solutions could bring stability and democracy to Macedonia. The full implementation of the Framework Agreement was urged and international efforts to this end were welcomed. The resolution also supported the establishment of a multinational security presence in Macedonia, requested by its government, to provide security to observers. A force was established in 2003.

Finally, efforts by the international Kosovo Force (KFOR) and United Nations Interim Administration Mission in Kosovo (UNMIK) to implement Resolution 1244 were welcomed, particularly with regard to illegal arms trafficking across borders and the confiscation of weapons.

== See also ==
- Kosovo War
- List of United Nations Security Council Resolutions 1301 to 1400 (2000–2002)
- National Liberation Army
