= United Nations Security Council Resolution 1728 =

UN Security Council Resolution 1728
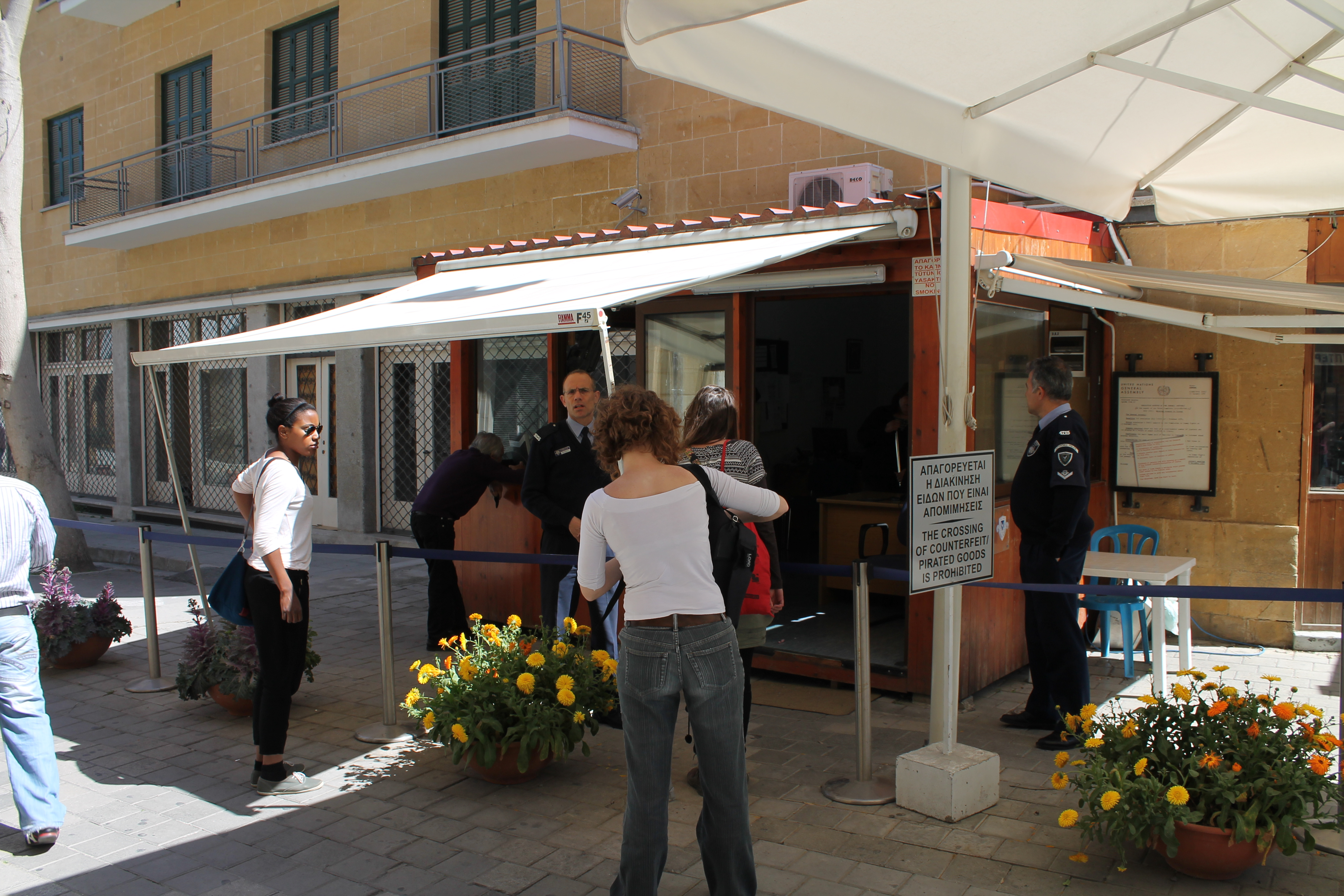
- Ledra Street
- Date: 15 December 2006
- Meeting no.: 5,593
- Code: S/RES/1728 (Document)
- Subject: The situation in Cyprus
- Voting summary: 15 voted for; None voted against; None abstained
- Result: Adopted

Security Council composition
- Permanent members: China; France; Russia; United Kingdom; United States
- Non-permanent members: Argentina; Rep. of the Congo; Denmark; Ghana; Greece; Japan; Peru; Qatar; Slovakia; Tanzania

United Nations Security Council Resolution 1728, adopted unanimously on December 15, 2006, after reaffirming all resolutions on the situation in Cyprus, particularly Resolution 1251 (1999), the Council extended the mandate of the United Nations Peacekeeping Force in Cyprus (UNFICYP) for six months until June 15, 2007.

== Resolution ==
=== Observations ===
The Security Council called on both Cyprus and Northern Cyprus to urgently address the humanitarian issue of missing persons. It noted the Secretary-General Kofi Annan's assessment that the security situation was stable and the situation along the Green Line was calm.

Both sides were urged to refrain from actions that would increase tension. Council members appreciated the work of the Under-Secretary-General Ibrahim Gambari in concluding an agreement outlining the principles of a bi-federal, bi-communal federation for a settlement of the dispute. It also welcomed crossings of Greek to the north and Turkish Cypriots to the south and the opening of additional crossing points, including Ledra Street.

There was concern that opportunities for public debate about the future of the island had become fewer, and the resolution reaffirmed the Council's responsibility to bring about a comprehensive settlement of the conflict. Furthermore, demining progress in the Nicosia area was welcomed along with UNFICYP's efforts to extend demining into Turkish Forces minefields.

The resolution went on to welcome the efforts the contributions of Greece and Cyprus to the peacekeeping operation, and efforts relating to the prevention of HIV/AIDS in the peacekeeping mission.

=== Acts ===
Extending UNFICYP's mandate, the resolution praised the efforts of the United Nations in Cyprus over the last ten years, further endorsing UNFICYP's efforts to implement the sexual exploitation policy. It urged the Turkish Cypriot side to restore the military status quo that existed at Strovilia prior to June 30, 2000.

The Council supported bi-communal discussions, and requested the Secretary-General to report by June 1, 2007 on progress made.

== See also ==
- Annan Plan for Cyprus
- Cyprus problem
- List of United Nations Security Council Resolutions 1701 to 1800 (2006–2008)
- United Nations Buffer Zone in Cyprus
- Turkish invasion of Cyprus
