= United Nations Security Council Resolution 1303 =

UN Security Council Resolution 1303
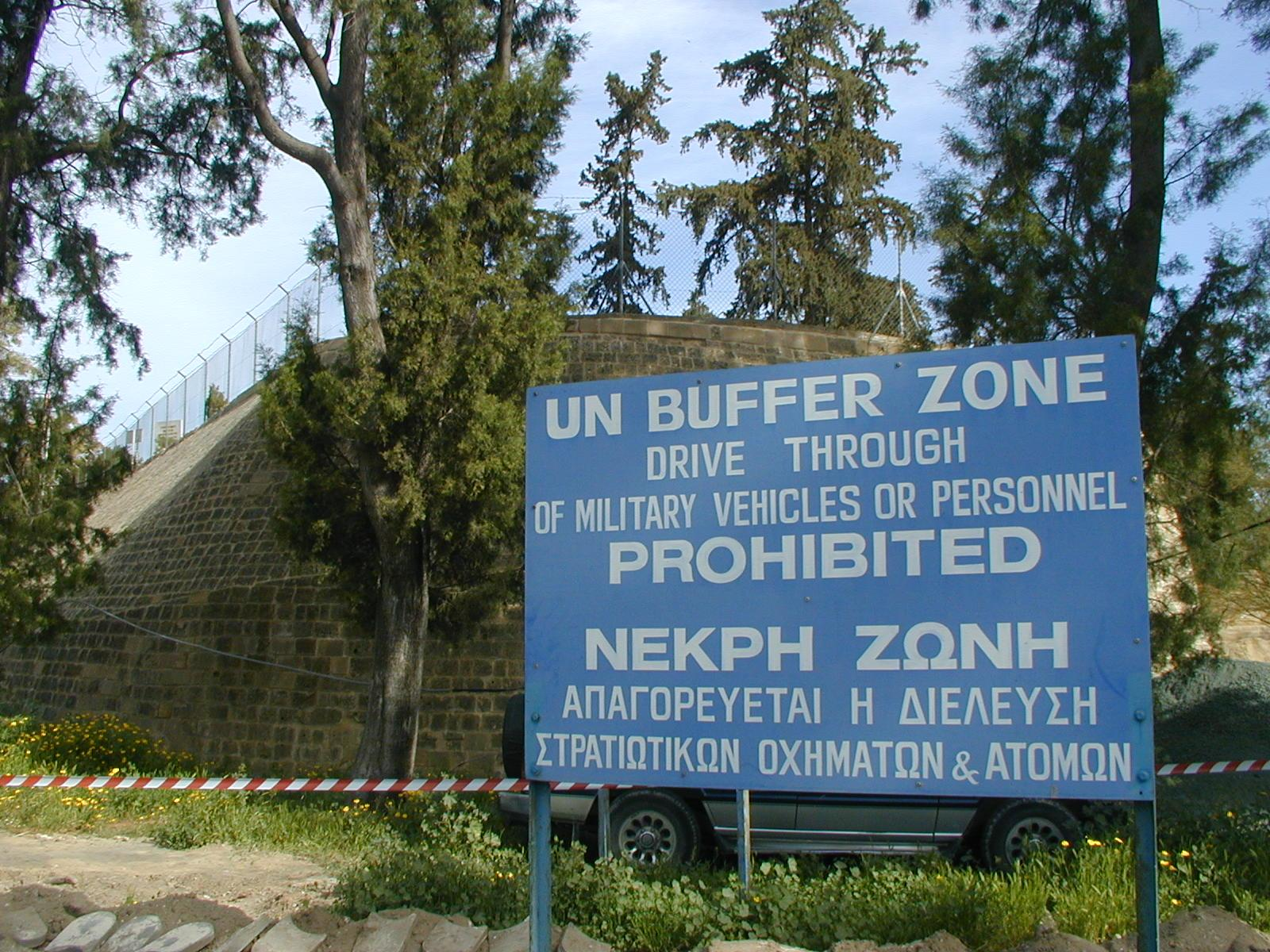
- United Nations Buffer Zone in Nicosia
- Date: 14 June 2000
- Meeting no.: 4,155
- Code: S/RES/1303 (Document)
- Subject: The situation in Cyprus
- Voting summary: 15 voted for; None voted against; None abstained
- Result: Adopted

Security Council composition
- Permanent members: China; France; Russia; United Kingdom; United States
- Non-permanent members: Argentina; Bangladesh; Canada; Jamaica; Malaysia; Mali; Namibia; Netherlands; Tunisia; Ukraine

United Nations Security Council resolution 1303, adopted unanimously on 14 June 2000, after reaffirming all resolutions on the situation in Cyprus, including resolutions 1251 (1999) and 1283 (1999), the Council extended the mandate of the United Nations Peacekeeping Force in Cyprus (UNFICYP) for a further six months until 15 December 2000. The resolution also noted that the Government of Cyprus had agreed that, given the prevailing conditions on the island, it was necessary for UNFICYP to remain beyond 15 June 2000.

The security council noted the call within the Secretary-General Kofi Annan's report for the authorities in Cyprus and Northern Cyprus to urgently address the humanitarian situation. The council also welcomed efforts to sensitise United Nations peacekeeping personnel towards the prevention and control of HIV/AIDS and other diseases.

Extending UNFICYP's mandate, the resolution requested the secretary-general to report to the council by 1 December 2000 on the implementation of the current resolution. Kofi Annan's report also noted increased contacts between both sides and the situation along the ceasefire line remained stable. The report also noted increased air violations of the buffer zone and threats against United Nations peacekeepers.

The wording of Resolution 1303 caused some controversy after the Greek Cypriot authorities were concerned that it indicated implicit recognition of Northern Cyprus and was subsequently altered. In protest, Turkish troops advanced 300m into the buffer zone near Strovilia and established a border checkpoint, refusing to move despite appeals by the United Nations.

== See also ==
- Cyprus dispute
- List of United Nations Security Council Resolutions 1301 to 1400 (2000–2002)
- United Nations Buffer Zone in Cyprus
- Turkish Invasion of Cyprus
