= United Nations Security Council Resolution 1361 =

UN Security Council Resolution 1361
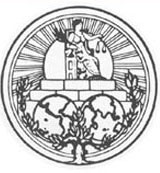
- Logo of the ICJ
- Date: 5 July 2001
- Meeting no.: 4,345
- Code: S/RES/1361 (Document)
- Subject: International Court of Justice
- Result: Adopted

Security Council composition
- Permanent members: China; France; Russia; United Kingdom; United States
- Non-permanent members: Bangladesh; Colombia; Ireland; Jamaica; Mali; Mauritius; Norway; Singapore; Tunisia; Ukraine

United Nations Security Council resolution 1361, adopted without a vote on 5 July 2001, after noting the resignation of International Court of Justice (ICJ) judge Mohammed Bedjaoui taking effect on 30 September 2001, the council decided that elections to the vacancy on the ICJ would take place on 12 October 2001 at the security council and at a meeting of the general assembly during its 56th session.

Bedjaoui, an Algerian diplomat and jurist, was a member of the court since March 1982 and its president from 1994 to 1997. His term of office was due to expire in February 2006.

== See also ==
- Judges of the International Court of Justice
- List of United Nations Security Council Resolutions 1301 to 1400 (2000–2002)
