= United Nations Security Council Resolution 1338 =

UN Security Council Resolution 1338
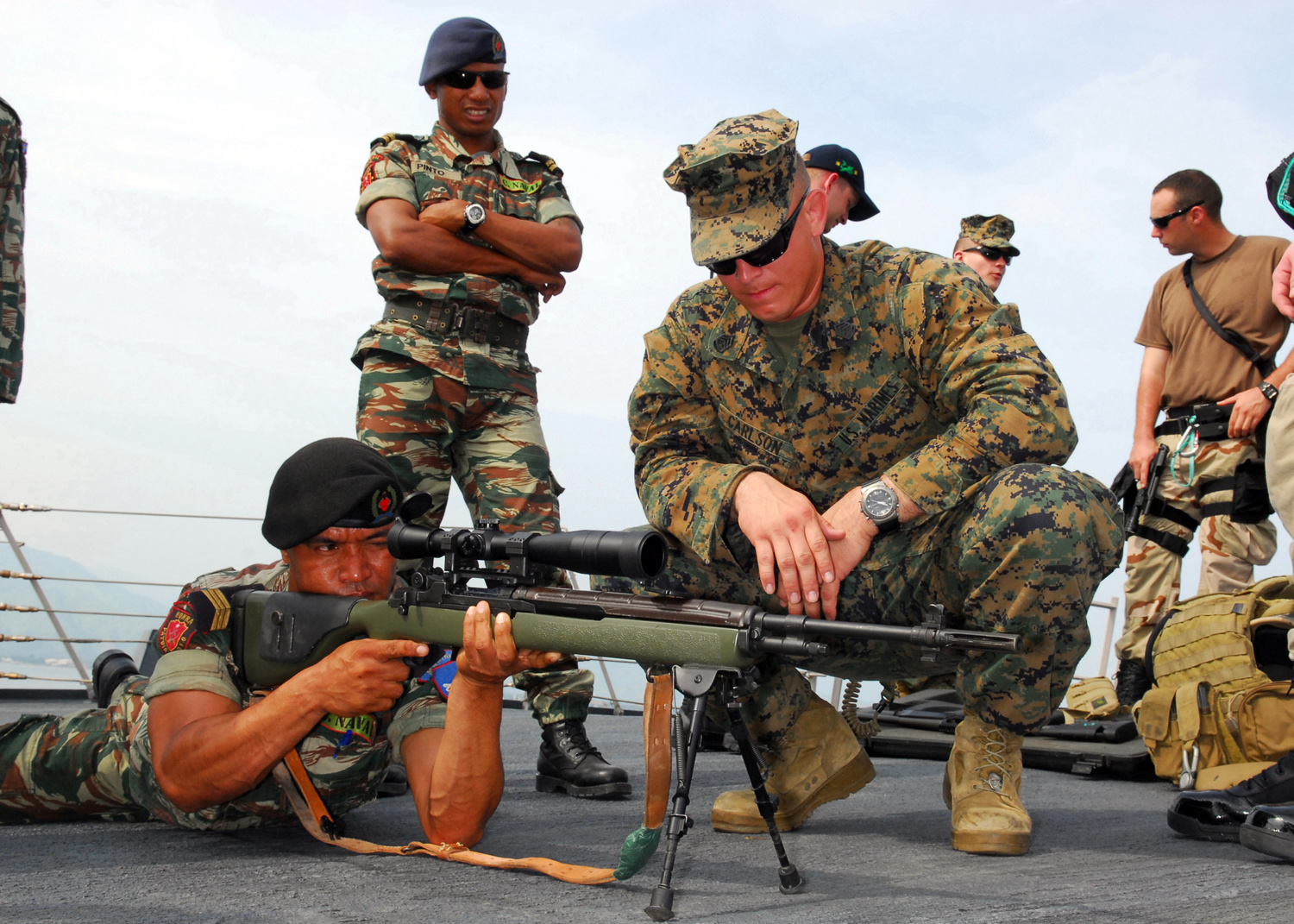
- Training of East Timorese soldiers
- Date: 31 January 2001
- Meeting no.: 4,268
- Code: S/RES/1338 (Document)
- Subject: The situation in East Timor
- Voting summary: 15 voted for; None voted against; None abstained
- Result: Adopted

Security Council composition
- Permanent members: China; France; Russia; United Kingdom; United States
- Non-permanent members: Bangladesh; Colombia; Ireland; Jamaica; Mali; Mauritius; Norway; Singapore; Tunisia; Ukraine

United Nations Security Council resolution 1338, adopted unanimously on 31 January 2001, after recalling previous resolutions on East Timor (Timor-Leste), particularly resolutions 1272 (1999) and 1319 (2000), the Council extended the mandate of the United Nations Transitional Administration in East Timor (UNTAET) for a year until 31 January 2002.

The Security Council supported measures taken by UNTAET to strengthen the involvement of the East Timorese people in the administration of their territory. It encouraged efforts to achieve independence for East Timor by the end of 2001 and noted that an international presence in the territory was necessary post-independence. There was also concern at the large number of refugees from East Timor located in camps in the Indonesian province of East Nusa Tenggara (West Timor) and militia activity in the region.

Extending UNTAET's mandate for an additional year bearing in mind adjustments, the Council urged the Special Representative of the Secretary-General to continue to delegate powers from the transitional administration to the East Timorese people and for UNTAET to support this process. Financial institutions and United Nations funds and programmes that promised humanitarian aid were asked to fulfill their commitments, while the international community was also called upon to assist in the creation of the East Timor Defence Force (F-FDTL).

The resolution underlined the need for UNTAET to respond to militia threats and those responsible for serious crimes in 1999 to be brought to justice. The Indonesian government was asked to continue to improve security for international personnel on Timor in accordance with Resolution 1319. Finally, the Secretary-General Kofi Annan was requested to report to the council by 30 April 2001 on the mandate of UNTAET, and to make recommendations regarding an international presence in East Timor within six months.

== See also ==
- 1999 East Timorese crisis
- East Timor Special Autonomy Referendum
- Indonesian occupation of East Timor
- List of United Nations Security Council Resolutions 1301 to 1400 (2000–2002)
- United Nations Mission in East Timor
