= United Nations Security Council Resolution 1347 =

UN Security Council Resolution 1347
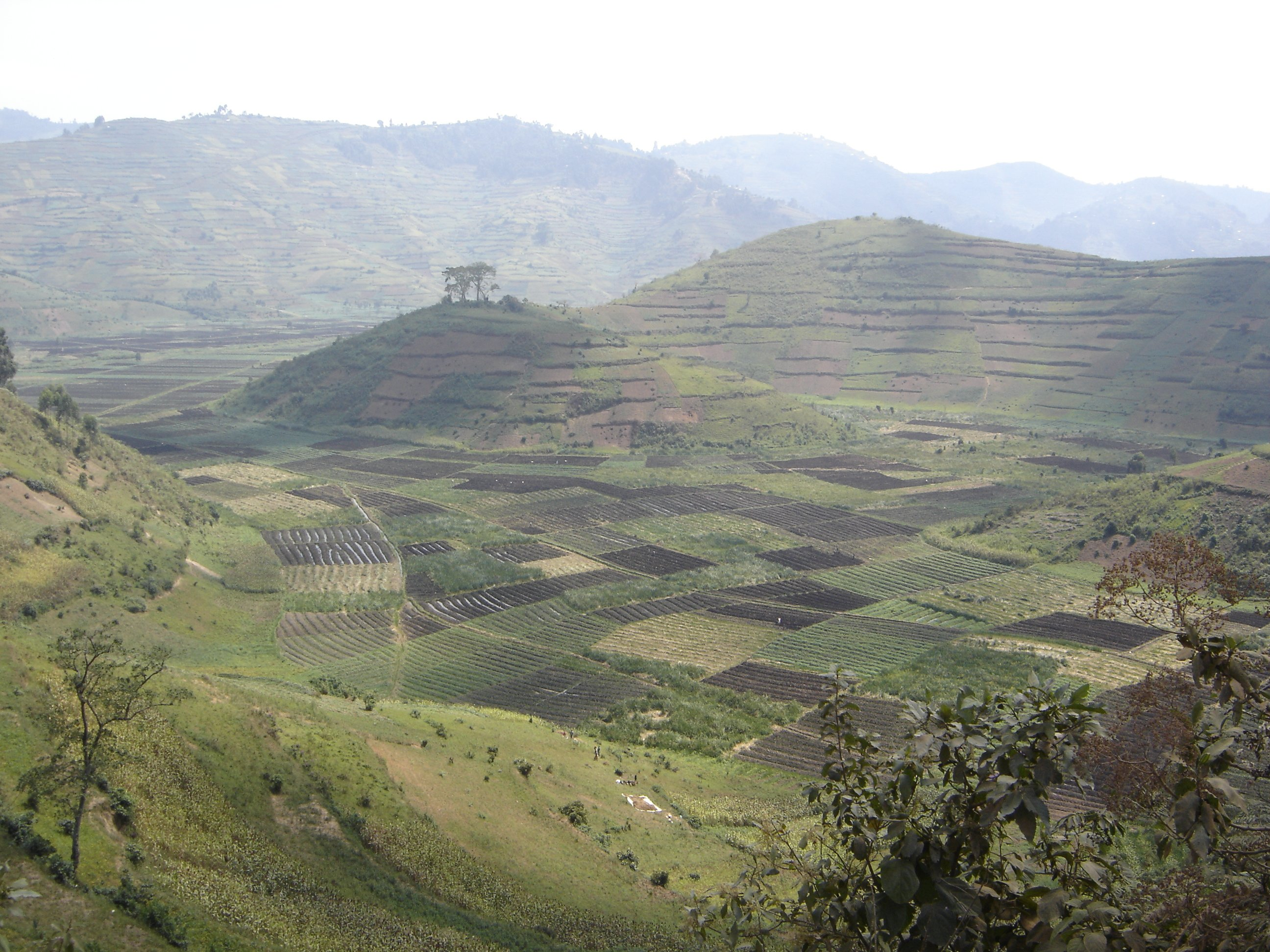
- Rwandan landscape
- Date: 30 March 2001
- Meeting no.: 4,307
- Code: S/RES/1347 (Document)
- Subject: The International Criminal Tribunal for Rwanda
- Voting summary: 15 voted for; None voted against; None abstained
- Result: Adopted

Security Council composition
- Permanent members: China; France; Russia; United Kingdom; United States
- Non-permanent members: Bangladesh; Colombia; Ireland; Jamaica; Mali; Mauritius; Norway; Singapore; Tunisia; Ukraine

United Nations Security Council resolution 1347, adopted unanimously on 30 March 2001, after recalling resolutions 955 (1994), 1165 (1998) and 1329 (2000), the Council forwarded a list of nominees for permanent judges at the International Criminal Tribunal for Rwanda (ICTR) to the General Assembly for consideration.

The list of nominees proposed by the Secretary-General Kofi Annan was as follows:

- Mouinou Aminou (Benin)
- Frederick Mwela Chomba (Zambia)
- Winston Churchill Matanzima Maqutu (Lesotho)
- Harris Michael Mtegha (Malawi)
- Arlette Ramaroson (Madagascar)

In April 2001, Arlette Ramaroson and Winston Churchill Matanzima Maqutu were elected to serve at the ICTR by the General Assembly until their terms expired on 24 May 2003.

== See also ==
- List of United Nations Security Council Resolutions 1301 to 1400 (2000–2002)
- Rwandan genocide
