= United Nations Security Council Resolution 1381 =

UN Security Council Resolution 1381
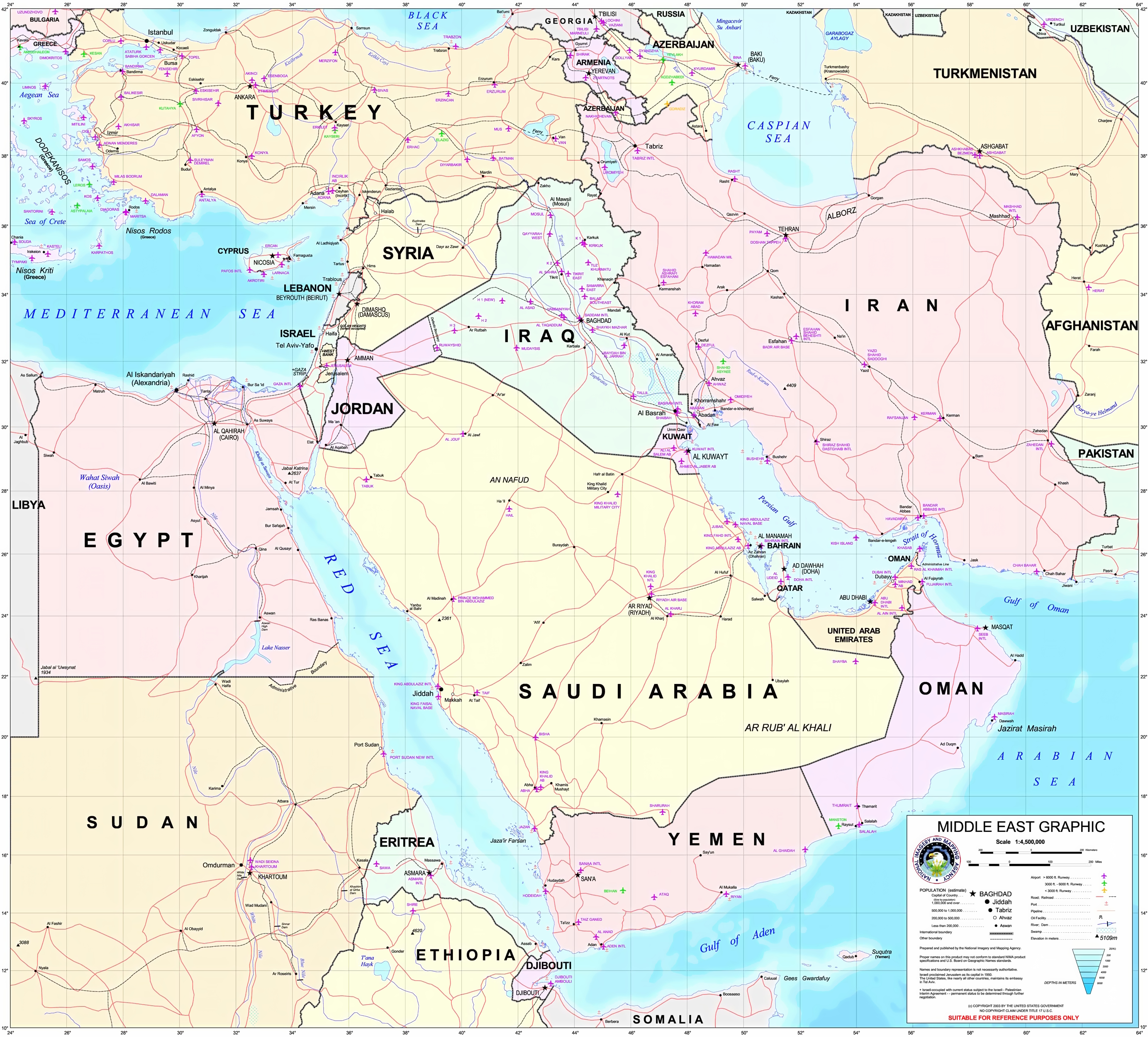
- Middle East
- Date: 27 November 2001
- Meeting no.: 4,428
- Code: S/RES/1381 (Document)
- Subject: The situation in the Middle East
- Voting summary: 15 voted for; None voted against; None abstained
- Result: Adopted

Security Council composition
- Permanent members: China; France; Russia; United Kingdom; United States
- Non-permanent members: Bangladesh; Colombia; Ireland; Jamaica; Mali; Mauritius; Norway; Singapore; Tunisia; Ukraine

United Nations Security Council resolution 1381, adopted unanimously on 27 November 2001, after considering a report by the secretary-general Kofi Annan regarding the United Nations Disengagement Observer Force (UNDOF), the council extended its mandate for a further six months until 31 May 2002.

The resolution called upon the parties concerned to immediately implement Resolution 338 (1973) and requested that the secretary-general submit a report on the situation at the end of that period.

The secretary-general's report pursuant to the previous resolution on UNDOF said that the situation between Israel and Syria had remained calm with no serious incidents though the situation in the Middle East as a whole remained dangerous until a settlement could be reached. It noted that both sides had co-operated with UNDOF though restrictions remained on its freedom of movement, and it also highlighted the dangers of minefields.

== See also ==
- Arab–Israeli conflict
- Golan Heights
- Israel–Syria relations
- List of United Nations Security Council Resolutions 1301 to 1400 (2000–2002)
