= United Nations Security Council Resolution 1318 =

UN Security Council Resolution 1318
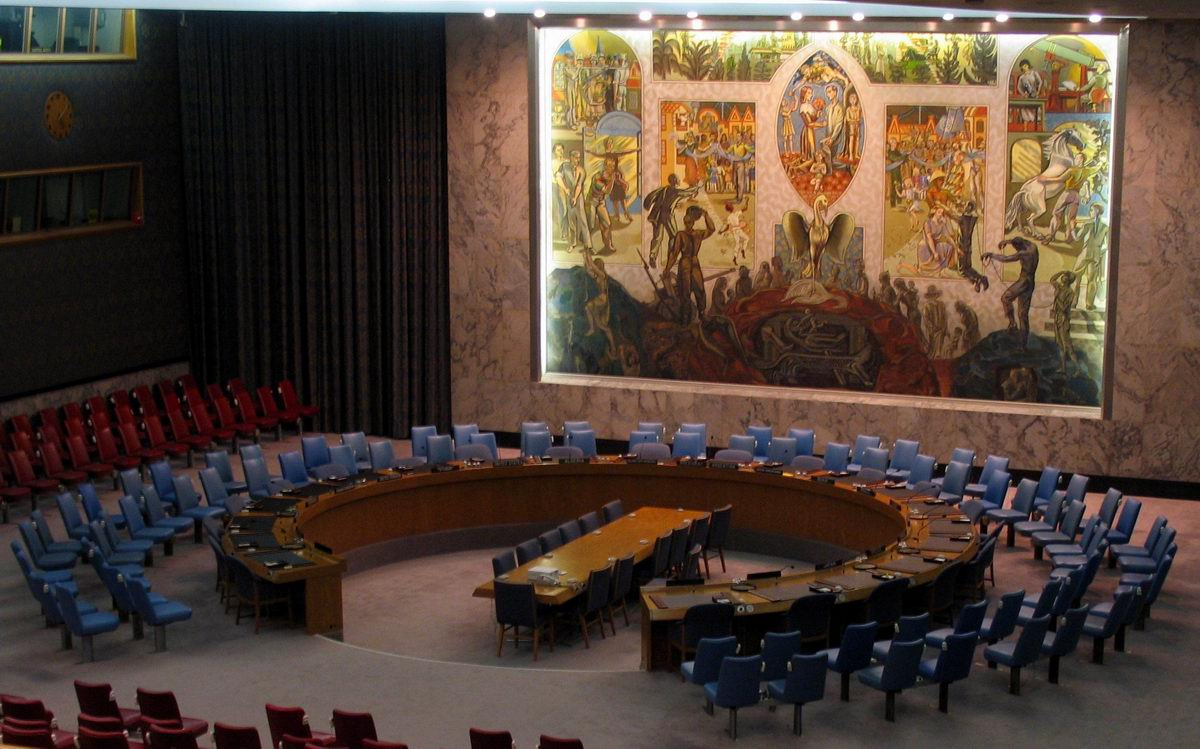
- The Security Council
- Date: 7 September 2000
- Meeting no.: 4,194
- Code: S/RES/1318 (Document)
- Subject: Ensuring an effective role for the Security Council in the maintenance of international peace and security, particularly in Africa
- Voting summary: 15 voted for; None voted against; None abstained
- Result: Adopted

Security Council composition
- Permanent members: China; France; Russia; United Kingdom; United States
- Non-permanent members: Argentina; Bangladesh; Canada; Jamaica; Malaysia; Mali; Namibia; Netherlands; Tunisia; Ukraine

United Nations Security Council resolution 1318, adopted unanimously on 7 September 2000, after holding a meeting of world leaders on occasion of the Millennium Summit, the Council endorsed the United Nations Millennium Declaration on ensuring an effective role for the Security Council in the maintenance of international peace and security, particularly in Africa.

== Resolution ==
The Security Council adopted the following declaration, divided into eight chapters.

=== I ===
The Security Council committed itself to the principles of the United Nations Charter; the equality, sovereignty, territorial integrity and independence of all nations; respect for human rights; and confirmed the non-use or threat of force in international relations.

=== II ===
The Council pledged to be involved in all stages of conflict, from prevention to post-conflict peacekeeping. All regions would have equal priority, but special attention would be given to Africa.

=== III ===
It strongly encouraged strategies to determine the root causes of conflicts. Peacekeeping operations would be strengthened with clear mandates with security, well-trained and equipped personnel and consultations with troop-contributing countries. The capacity for peacekeeping forces had to be enhanced and funding improved.

=== IV ===
The report of the Panel on United Nations Peace Operations would be considered.

=== V ===
It was crucial that ex-combatants were disarmed, demobilised and reintegrated, and that such programmes should be included into the mandates of peacekeeping operations.

=== VI ===
The Council called for international action against illicit arms trafficking and the perpetrators of crimes against humanity, genocide and war crimes be tried. Furthermore, it was important that peacekeepers were sensitised against HIV/AIDS in all operations.

=== VII ===
Contacts with regional and international organisations had to be strengthened in accordance with Chapter VIII of the United Nations Charter. In the case of Africa, continued co-operation and co-ordination between the United Nations and Organisation of African Unity to address conflicts was emphasised.

=== VIII ===
Ultimately, the responsibility to resolve conflicts was with the parties themselves. Peacekeeping operations designed to implement peace agreements would only be successful if there was genuine commitment from the concerned parties. Finally, the Council called upon all states to secure a world free from war.

== See also ==
- List of United Nations Security Council Resolutions 1301 to 1400 (2000–2002)
- Millennium Development Goals
