= United Nations Security Council Resolution 1315 =

UN Security Council Resolution 1315
- Flag of Sierra Leone
- Date: 14 August 2000
- Meeting no.: 4,186
- Code: S/RES/1315 (Document)
- Subject: The situation in Sierra Leone
- Voting summary: 15 voted for; None voted against; None abstained
- Result: Adopted

Security Council composition
- Permanent members: China; France; Russia; United Kingdom; United States
- Non-permanent members: Argentina; Bangladesh; Canada; Jamaica; Malaysia; Mali; Namibia; Netherlands; Tunisia; Ukraine

United Nations Security Council resolution 1315, adopted unanimously on 14 August 2000, after expressing concern at serious crimes committed in Sierra Leone, the Council expressed its intention to establish the Special Court for Sierra Leone to deal with violations of human rights, international law and war crimes in the country.

== Resolution ==
=== Observations ===
The Security Council commended the efforts of the Government of Sierra Leone and the Economic Community of West African States (ECOWAS) to bring peace to the country. ECOWAS had agreed to dispatch an investigation into the resumption of hostilities and the government was in the process of creating a national truth and reconciliation process. The United Nations had the Lomé Peace Accord amended with a provision that excluded war criminals from a planned amnesty. Meanwhile, the importance of compliance with international law and a credible justice system was stressed. The Sierra Leone government desired the establishment of a special court to bring justice and establish peace. The Council declared that the situation in the country continued to constitute a threat to peace and security.

=== Acts ===
The resolution requested the Secretary-General Kofi Annan to negotiate an agreement with the government in Sierra Leone to establish an independent special court. The jurisdiction of the court should include crimes against humanity, war crimes and other violations of international humanitarian law and the law of Sierra Leone. The impartiality and independence of the process was emphasised.

The Secretary-General was requested to submit a report on the implementation of the current resolution within 30 days. In his report, he was required to address its temporal jurisdiction, appeals process, feasibility and the option of sharing an appeals chamber at the International Criminal Tribunals for the former Yugoslavia and Rwanda. Furthermore, he was also requested to make recommendations regarding:

(a) necessary additional agreements;
(b) necessary participation of Member States, ECOWAS countries and the United Nations Mission in Sierra Leone for an effective, independent and impartial functioning of the court;
(c) necessary financial contributions;
(d) expertise and advice from the International Criminal Tribunals for the former Yugoslavia and Rwanda.

== See also ==
- List of United Nations Security Council Resolutions 1301 to 1400 (2000–2002)
- Sierra Leone Civil War
