= United Nations Security Council Resolution 1160 =

United Nations Security Council resolution

UN Security Council Resolution 1160
- Kosovo in the former Yugoslavia
- Date: 31 March 1998
- Meeting no.: 3,868
- Code: S/RES/1160 (Document)
- Subject: The situation in Kosovo
- Voting summary: 14 voted for; None voted against; 1 abstained
- Result: Adopted

Security Council composition
- Permanent members: China; France; Russia; United Kingdom; United States
- Non-permanent members: Bahrain; Brazil; Costa Rica; Gabon; Gambia; Japan; Kenya; Portugal; Slovenia; Sweden

United Nations Security Council resolution 1160, adopted on 31 March 1998, after noting the situation in Kosovo, the council, acting under Chapter VII of the United Nations Charter, imposed an arms embargo and economic sanctions on the Federal Republic of Yugoslavia, hoping to end the use of excessive force by the government.

Some countries had suggested a comprehensive arms embargo to be imposed against Serbia and Montenegro, including Kosovo. The Security Council condemned the violence that the Serbian police used against peaceful demonstrators, and the terrorist acts of the Kosovo Liberation Army.

Yugoslavia was urged to seek a political solution to the conflict, while the Kosovar Albanians were called upon to condemn all terrorist actions and pursue their goals through peaceful means. It was stated that the only way to avoid further violence was to allow the Kosovar Albanian community a genuine political process and prospects for meaningful autonomy and self-determination.

Acting under Chapter VII, the Council imposed an arms embargo on Serbia and Montenegro, and established a Committee to monitor its implementation and suggest improvements. The measures would be revised if it noted in reports from the Secretary-General Kofi Annan, the Organization for Security and Co-operation in Europe, Contact Group and European Union that Serbia and Montenegro had begun a dialogue, withdrew its police forces, allowed access to humanitarian aid agencies and accepted missions from the OSCE and United Nations High Commissioner for Refugees to the region.

The resolution concluded by asking the Prosecutor at the International Criminal Tribunal for the former Yugoslavia to begin gathering information on human rights violations, affirming that further measures would be imposed if there was no constructive progress. The arms embargo was lifted under Resolution 1367 (2001).

Resolution 1160 was approved by 14 votes to none against, with one abstention from China, which argued that it was an internal matter.

== Consequences ==
The Kosovo Verification Mission sought to verify compliance with resolution 1160. The resolution was disregarded:

United Nations Security Council Resolution 1160 laid economic sanctions on Belgrade on March 31, and Clinton froze Yugoslavia's assets in the United States. But the spring and summer brought greater carnage, and a quarter-million Albanians were left at least temporarily homeless.

NATO then planned to intervene by force.

== See also ==
- Breakup of Yugoslavia
- Kosovo War
- List of United Nations Security Council Resolutions 1101 to 1200 (1997–1998)
- List of United Nations Security Council Resolutions related to the conflicts in former Yugoslavia
