= United Nations Security Council Resolution 1319 =

UN Security Council Resolution 1319
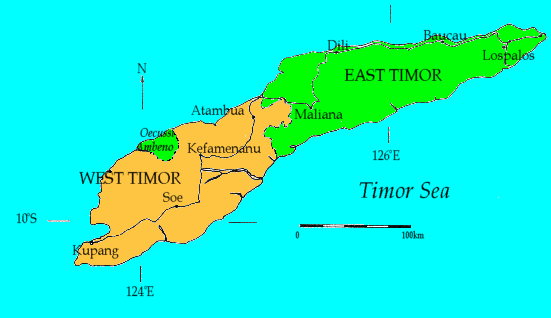
- Island of Timor
- Date: 8 September 2000
- Meeting no.: 4,195
- Code: S/RES/1319 (Document)
- Subject: The situation in East Timor
- Voting summary: 15 voted for; None voted against; None abstained
- Result: Adopted

Security Council composition
- Permanent members: China; France; Russia; United Kingdom; United States
- Non-permanent members: Argentina; Bangladesh; Canada; Jamaica; Malaysia; Mali; Namibia; Netherlands; Tunisia; Ukraine

United Nations Security Council resolution 1319, adopted unanimously on 8 September 2000, after recalling previous resolutions on East Timor (Timor-Leste), the Council demanded that Indonesia take steps to disarm and disband militia on the island following the killing of three United Nations staff.

The Security Council recalled its previous concern about the many refugees from East Timor present in camps in West Timor. Militia were also present in the camps and intimidating refugees and staff from the United Nations High Commissioner for Refugees (UNHCR). It was appalled by the murder of three United Nations staff on 6 September 2000 by a militia-led mob, and attacks against international personnel in the country and refugees were condemned. A number of refugees were also killed in Betun, West Timor, and the Council welcomed condemnation and intention of holding an investigation by Indonesia.

The resolution insisted that the Indonesian government take steps to immediately disarm and disband the militia, restore law and order, ensure the safety of refugee camps and of humanitarian workers and prevent cross-border incursions. It also stressed that those responsible for the armed attacks on the island of Timor be brought to justice, particularly as grave violations of international humanitarian law had taken place.

The Indonesian authorities were called upon to ensure the safe return of refugees who would voluntarily return to East Timor and those that did not would be resettled. The Council noted that Indonesia had deployed additional troops in West Timor but noted that UNHCR workers could not return until there were credible guarantees of safety. The United Nations Transitional Administration in East Timor had to urgently respond to the militia threat in accordance with Resolution 1272 (1999).

Finally, the Secretary-General Kofi Annan was requested to report within a week to the council on the situation on the island.

Following the adoption of Resolution 1319, the Council approved the dispatch of a mission to the region to discuss its implementation.

== See also ==
- 1999 East Timorese crisis
- East Timor Special Autonomy Referendum
- Indonesian occupation of East Timor
- List of United Nations Security Council Resolutions 1301 to 1400 (2000–2002)
- United Nations Mission in East Timor
