= United Nations Security Council Resolution 1345 =

UN Security Council Resolution 1345
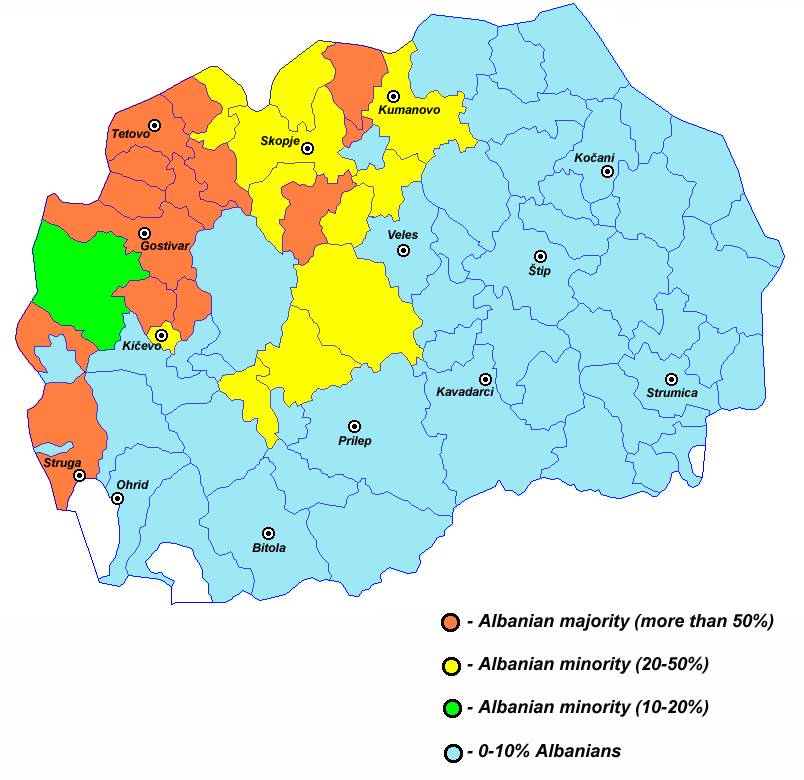
- Albanians in Macedonia (2002)
- Date: 21 March 2001
- Meeting no.: 4,301
- Code: S/RES/1345 (Document)
- Subject: The letter dated 4 March 2001 from the Permanent Representative of The former Yugoslav Republic of Macedonia to the United Nations addressed to the President of the Security Council
- Voting summary: 15 voted for; None voted against; None abstained
- Result: Adopted

Security Council composition
- Permanent members: China; France; Russia; United Kingdom; United States
- Non-permanent members: Bangladesh; Colombia; Ireland; Jamaica; Mali; Mauritius; Norway; Singapore; Tunisia; Ukraine

United Nations Security Council resolution 1345, adopted unanimously on 21 March 2001, after reaffirming resolutions 1160 (1998), 1199 (1998), 1203 (2000), 1239 (1999) and 1244 (1999) on the situation in the former Yugoslavia, the council condemned extremist violence and terrorist activities in parts of Macedonia and southern Serbia and called upon Kosovo Albanian leaders to condemn the violence.

The Security Council welcomed steps taken by the Government of Macedonia to consolidate a multiethnic society within its borders. It also welcomed plans by the Federal Republic of Yugoslavia (Serbia and Montenegro) to peacefully resolve the crisis in southern Serbia. Furthermore, the efforts of both governments, the European Union, NATO, the Organization for Security and Co-operation in Europe (OSCE), the Kosovo Force (KFOR) and United Nations Interim Administration Mission in Kosovo (UNMIK) to prevent the escalation of ethnic tensions and manage the security situation in the region were welcomed.

The resolution, initiated by Russia, condemned extremist violence and terrorist activities in Macedonia and southern Serbia and noted that it had support from ethnic Albanian extremists outside these areas. It demanded all individuals engaged in armed actions against authorities in these states immediately disarm and all differences had to be resolved through dialogue. All parties had to act with restraint with respect for human rights and in accordance with international humanitarian law.

The council appreciated efforts by Albania to promote peace in the region and isolate extremists. Kosovo Albanian political leaders and ethnic Albanian leaders elsewhere were called upon to publicly condemn violence and ethnic hatred. The efforts of KFOR to implement its mandate were welcomed and the international community was called upon to consider ways in which they could help efforts in the region. Finally, all states were asked to respect the sovereignty and territorial integrity of other states in the region.

== See also ==
- Kosovo War
- List of United Nations Security Council Resolutions 1301 to 1400 (2000–2002)
- National Liberation Army
