= United Nations Security Council Resolution 1313 =

UN Security Council Resolution 1313
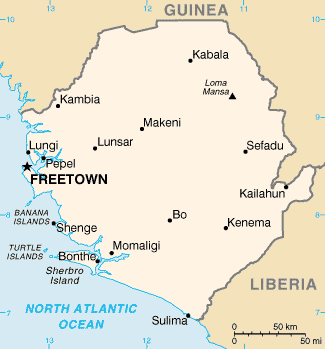
- Sierra Leone
- Date: 4 August 2000
- Meeting no.: 4,184
- Code: S/RES/1313 (Document)
- Subject: The situation in Sierra Leone
- Voting summary: 15 voted for; None voted against; None abstained
- Result: Adopted

Security Council composition
- Permanent members: China; France; Russia; United Kingdom; United States
- Non-permanent members: Argentina; Bangladesh; Canada; Jamaica; Malaysia; Mali; Namibia; Netherlands; Tunisia; Ukraine

United Nations Security Council resolution 1313, regarding extending the mandate of the United Nations Mission in Sierra Leone (UNAMSIL) was adopted unanimously on 4 August 2000. After recalling all previous resolutions on the situation in Sierra Leone, the Security Council extended the UNAMSIL mandate until 8 September 2000 and expressed its intention to review the mission's mandate based on recommendations.

The resolution began by strongly condemning attacks against and the detention of UNAMSIL personnel, and commended the decisive action of the UNAMSIL Force Commander against the continuing threat from the Revolutionary United Front (RUF) and other armed elements. Violations of the Lomé Peace Accord had taken place by the RUF which justified a strengthening of UNAMSIL's mandate until the security of the operation was guaranteed and a permissive environment was established. Taking the views of the Economic Community of West African States (ECOWAS), Government of Sierra Leone and troop-contributing countries into account, the mandate of UNAMSIL, based on resolutions 1270 (1999) and 1289 (1999), was assigned the following tasks:

(a) maintain the security of and major routes to Lungi and Freetown;
(b) respond against threats from the RUF;
(c) deploy in strategic locations and main population centres;
(d) patrol on strategic lines of communication such as main routes to the capital Freetown;
(e) promote the peace process leading to renewed demilitarisation, demobilisation and reintegration programmes.

The military component of UNAMSIL would be reinforced through troop rotations and a strengthened force reserve with upgraded combat and logistic equipment. The Council recognised that the RUF offensive against UNAMSIL revealed weaknesses in the mission and recommendations to improve the performance and capacity of the mission were required to be implemented. The completion of the objectives of the mission would depend upon improved units, adequate resources and commitment to implement its mandate.

Finally, the Secretary-General Kofi Annan was requested to report to the council as soon as possible on the restructuring and strengthening of UNAMSIL.

== See also ==
- List of United Nations Security Council Resolutions 1301 to 1400 (2000–2002)
- Sierra Leone Civil War
