= United Nations Security Council Resolution 1359 =

UN Security Council Resolution 1359
- Location of Western Sahara
- Date: 29 June 2001
- Meeting no.: 4,342
- Code: S/RES/1359 (Document)
- Subject: The situation concerning Western Sahara
- Voting summary: 15 voted for; None voted against; None abstained
- Result: Adopted

Security Council composition
- Permanent members: China; France; Russia; United Kingdom; United States
- Non-permanent members: Bangladesh; Colombia; Ireland; Jamaica; Mali; Mauritius; Norway; Singapore; Tunisia; Ukraine

United Nations Security Council resolution 1359, adopted unanimously on 29 June 2001, after recalling all previous resolutions on Western Sahara, in particular Resolution 1108 (1997), the Council extended the mandate of the United Nations Mission for the Referendum in Western Sahara (MINURSO) until 30 November 2001.

The Security Council reiterated its support for efforts by MINURSO and the United Nations and agreements adopted by Morocco and the Polisario Front to hold a free and fair referendum on self-determination for the people of Western Sahara in accordance with the Settlement Plan. It noted proposals by the Polisario Front to overcome obstacles between the two parties and also took a memorandum by Algeria into account.

Extending MINURSO's mandate, the resolution supported the efforts of the Secretary-General Kofi Annan to invite all parties to talks to discuss a framework agreement and negotiate any changes. It emphasised that nothing overall would be agreed until everything had been agreed between the parties. The parties were urged to resolve the issue of missing people and release those detained since the start of the conflict in compliance with international humanitarian law.

Finally, the Secretary-General was required to provide an assessment at the end of its current mandate and on the future of MINURSO.

== See also ==
- Free Zone (region)
- Political status of Western Sahara
- List of United Nations Security Council Resolutions 1301 to 1400 (2000–2002)
- Sahrawi Arab Democratic Republic
- Moroccan Western Sahara Wall
