= Elections in Sierra Leone =

Elections in Sierra Leone are held on a national level to elect the president and the unicameral Parliament. Sierra Leone has a multi-party system, with two strong parties.

Both the president and the members of Parliament are elected for five-year terms. The Parliament has 124 members, 112 elected through plurality vote in single-member constituencies and 12 members elected by indirect vote.

An independent Electoral Commission, composed of a chairman and four commissioners, is selected by the president, subject to the approval of Parliament. The commission is responsible for voter registration and elections and referendums. and the registration of both voters and political parties. There must also be an independent Political Parties Registration Commission, made up of four members chosen by the president.

Voters must be 18 years old and of sound mind. Voting is by secret ballot.

The last election was held on the 24th of June, 2023.

== Latest elections ==
=== Presidential ===
Candidate	Running mate	Party	Votes	%
Julius Maada Bio	Mohamed Juldeh Jalloh	Sierra Leone People's Party	1,566,932	56.17
Samura Kamara	Chernor Maju Bah	All People's Congress	1,148,262	41.16
Mohamed Bah	Mariatu Saudatu Turay	National Democratic Alliance (Sierra Leone)	21,620	0.77
Charles Margai	Tony Hindolo Songa	People's Movement for Democratic Change	16,012	0.57
Nabieu Kamara	Saidu Mannah	Peace and Liberation Party	7,717	0.28
Abdulahi Saccoh	Alice Pyne	Revolutionary United Front	6,796	0.24
Prince Coker	Ibrahim Jalloh	People's Democratic Party (Sierra Leone)	5,981	0.21
Iye Kakay	Ambrose Kobi	Alliance Democratic Party	4,336	0.16
Saa Kabuta	Gabriel Samuka	United National People's Party	4,059	0.15
Beresford Williams	Kadija Bangura	Republic National Independent Party	2,692	0.10
Mohamed Jonjo	Kaday Johnson	Citizen's Democratic Party	2,367	0.08
Mohamed Sowa-Turay	Olivette Walker	United Democratic Movement	1,665	0.06
Jonathan Sandy	Komba Mbawa	National Unity and Reconciliation Party	1,369	0.05
Total			2,789,808	100.00

=== Parliamentary ===
Party	Votes	%	Seats
Sierra Leone People's Party	1,578,259	56.68	81
All People's Congress	1,113,882	40.00	54
National Grand Coalition	18,169	0.65	0
People's Movement for Democratic Change	17,390	0.62	0
National Democratic Alliance (Sierra Leone)	3,819	0.14	0
Revolutionary United Front	1,502	0.05	0
Peace and Liberation Party	1,131	0.04	0
National Unity and Reconciliation Party	1,000	0.04	0
Republic National Independent Party	560	0.02	0
People's Democratic Party (Sierra Leone)	516	0.02	0
Independents	48,464	1.74	0
Paramount chiefs	0	0.00	14
Total	2,784,692	100.00	149

== See also ==
- Politics of Sierra Leone
- List of political parties in Sierra Leone
