= United Nations Security Council Resolution 1289 =

UN Security Council Resolution 1289
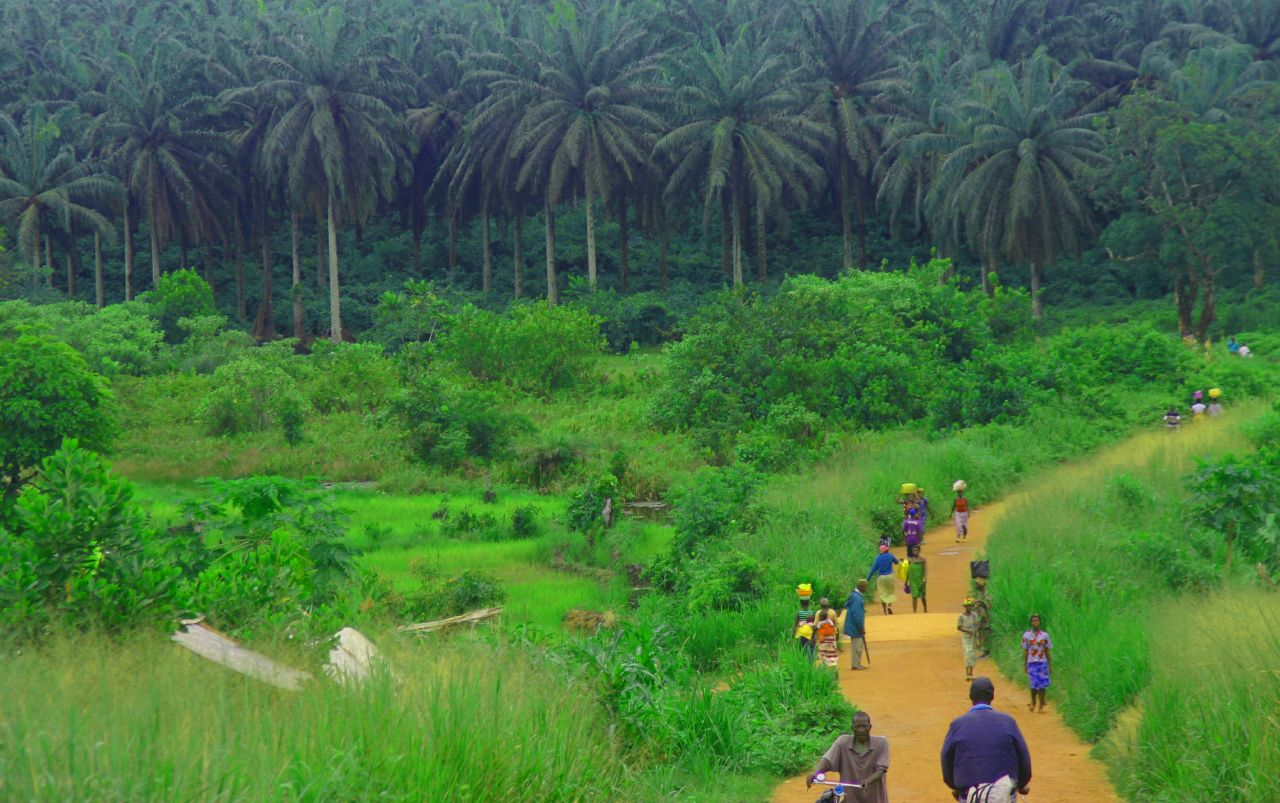
- Southeastern Sierra Leone
- Date: 7 February 2000
- Meeting no.: 4,099
- Code: S/RES/1289 (Document)
- Subject: The situation in Sierra Leone
- Voting summary: 15 voted for; None voted against; None abstained
- Result: Adopted

Security Council composition
- Permanent members: China; France; Russia; United Kingdom; United States
- Non-permanent members: Argentina; Bangladesh; Canada; Jamaica; Malaysia; Mali; Namibia; Netherlands; Tunisia; Ukraine

United Nations Security Council resolution 1289 was adopted unanimously on 7 February 2000. After recalling resolutions 1171 (1998), 1181 (1998), 1231 (1999), 1260 (1999), 1265 (1999) and 1270 (1999) on the situation in Sierra Leone, the Security Council extended the mandate of the United Nations Mission in Sierra Leone (UNAMSIL) for a period of six months and expanded its military component.

The Security Council noted that the deployment of UNAMSIL was in the process of completion. There was progress towards peace but this was hampered by the lack of disarmament, demobilisation and reintegration of rebels, lack of progress on the release of abductees, use of child soldiers and new attacks on aid workers. It was also concerned about continuing human rights violations and emphasised that the peace deal agreed in the amnesty did not apply to violations committed after the date of signing of that agreement. The Revolutionary United Front (RUF), the Civil Defence Forces, the former Sierra Leone Armed Forces/Armed Forces Revolutionary Council (AFRC) were urged to participate in the disarmament, demobilisation and reintegration programme.

The resolution noted the withdrawal of troops from Nigeria, Ghana and Guinea from the Economic Community of West African States (ECOWAS) peacekeeping force, the Economic Community of West African States Monitoring Group (ECOMOG). It then decided that the military component of UNAMSIL would be expanded to 11,100 troops, including 260 military observers who were already deployed.

Acting under Chapter VII of the United Nations Charter, the peacekeeping force was given the additional responsibilities of guarding government buildings – mainly in the capital Freetown, important intersections and major airports, assist in the distribution of relief supplies and securing the sites of the disarmament program and the collection of weapons. The mandate of UNAMSIL was subsequently extended by a period of six months, a land mine office was established and increases in civil affairs, civilian police, administrative and technical personnel were authorised. Additionally, UNAMSIL could take all necessary action to ensure its freedom of movement and security and protect civilians under threat of violence.

The Council urged the parties to accelerate the establishment of commissions on human rights, truth and reconciliation and the consolidation of peace. It was also important that the Government of Sierra Leone had full control over the exploitation of diamonds, gold and other resources. Finally, the Secretary-General Kofi Annan was requested to provide assessments every 45 days of security conditions in Sierra Leone.

== See also ==
- History of Sierra Leone
- List of United Nations Security Council Resolutions 1201 to 1300 (1998–2000)
- Lomé Peace Accord
- Sierra Leone Civil War
