= Strovilia =

Strovilia: Στροβίλια (Greek); Akyar (Turkish)
- Location in Cyprus
- Coordinates: 35°05′46″N 33°54′08″E
- Country: United Kingdom / Cyprus
- British Overseas Territory: Akrotiri and Dhekelia
- Time zone: UTC+2 (EET)
  - Summer (DST): UTC+3 (EEST)
- Climate: Csa

Strovilia (Greek: Στροβίλια), (Turkish: Akyar) is a small Cypriot village located at the border of the de facto Turkish Republic of Northern Cyprus (TRNC) with the British Sovereign Base Area (SBA) of Dhekelia. It is the site of a Green Line crossing between Cyprus and Northern Cyprus. Some of Strovilia lies in Northern Cyprus, some in UK's SBA.

The Cyprus UN buffer zone boundaries are defined as the cease fire lines of 16 August 1974.

On 30 June 2000, according to Greek Cypriot media, the Turkish military advanced into the no man's land area in Strovila between Northern Cyprus and UK's SBA and took control of it since there was no official buffer zone between Northern Cyprus and UK's SBA. According to Turkish Cypriot media, the Turkish military established a control point within Northern Cyprus, and hence did not advance.

On 14 December 2011, United Nations Security Council (UNSC) adopted the resolution renewing the United Nations Peacekeeping Force in Cyprus (UNFICYP) and calling for the restoration in Strovilia of "the military status quo which existed prior to 30 June 2000".

On 1 February 2019, Greek Cypriots claimed again the Turkish military advanced and took control of another three Greek Cypriot houses in the Rep. of Cyprus. On 22 February 2019, the British High Commission revealed that it was UK's SBA who temporarily set up a barricade in the dirt road to prevent smuggling activities and apply customs checks through the border gate. The Commission reaffirmed that Greek Cypriot residents of Strovilia can pass through SBA-RoC uninhibitedly.

In March 2019, Edmund Freely, Chief of Staff of the UNFICYP Security corps attempted to enter Strovilia without the written permission of the Northern Cyprus officials. The police of Northern Cyprus arrested him.

On 12 March 2020, the Government of Northern Cyprus closed the border gate between Northern Cyprus and UK's SBA in Strovilia for coronavirus precautions.

Strovilia was not mentioned in subsequent UNSC resolutions for the renewal of UNFICYP until the resolution of 30 July 2014, which reiterated the call for the restoration.
