= United Nations Security Council Resolution 1270 =

UN Security Council Resolution 1270
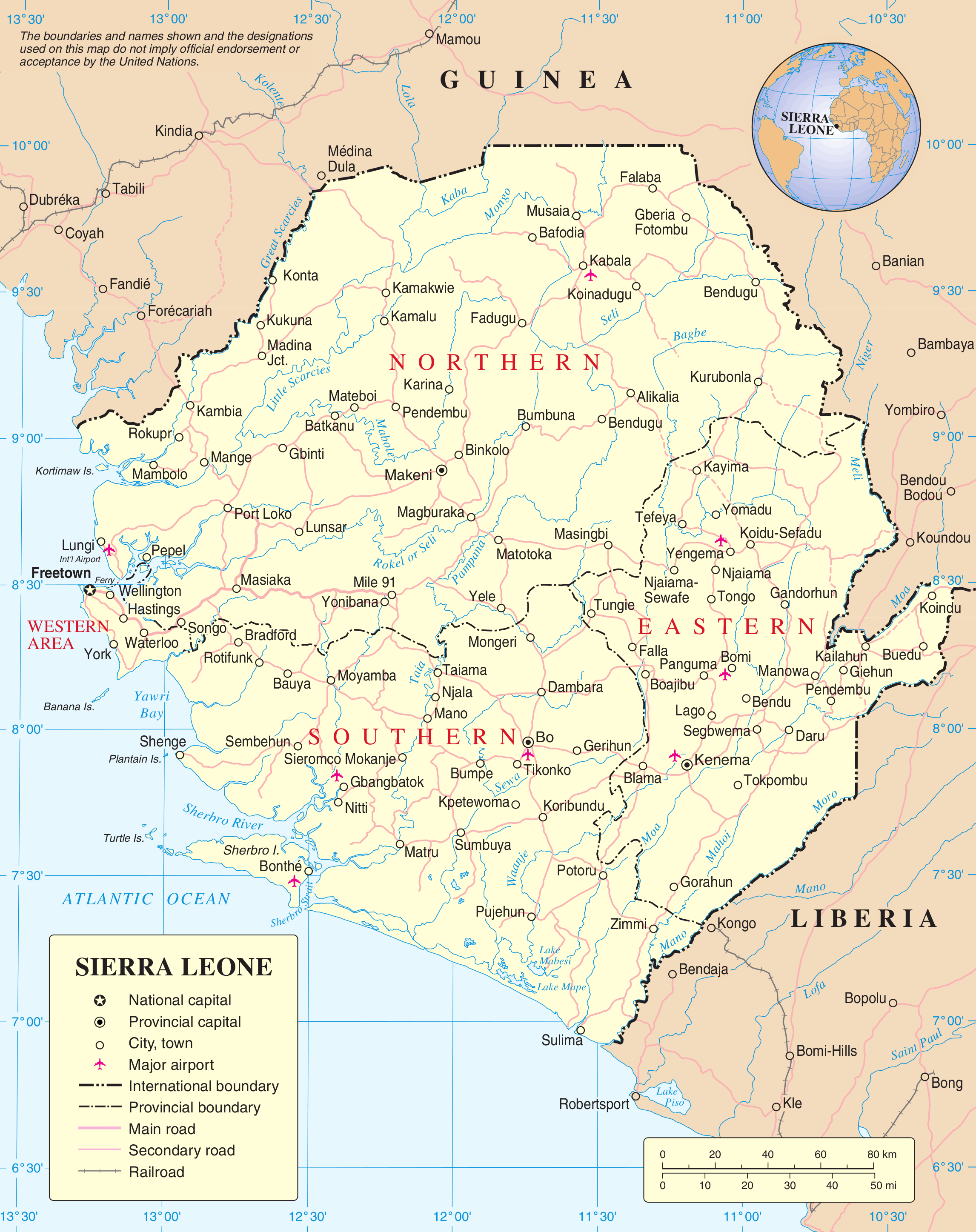
- Sierra Leone
- Date: 22 October 1999
- Meeting no.: 4,054
- Code: S/RES/1270 (Document)
- Subject: The situation in Sierra Leone
- Voting summary: 15 voted for; None voted against; None abstained
- Result: Adopted

Security Council composition
- Permanent members: China; France; Russia; United Kingdom; United States
- Non-permanent members: Argentina; Bahrain; Brazil; Canada; Gabon; Gambia; Malaysia; Namibia; Netherlands; Slovenia

United Nations Security Council resolution 1270 was adopted unanimously on 22 October 1999. After recalling resolutions 1171 (1998), 1181 (1998), 1231 (1999) and 1260 (1999) on the situation in Sierra Leone and Resolution 1265 (1999) on the protection of civilians in armed conflict, resolution 1270 adopted by the Security Council established the United Nations Mission in Sierra Leone (UNAMSIL) to assist in the implementation of the Lomé Peace Accord.

The Government of Sierra Leone and rebels in the country had taken important steps to implement the peace agreement of 7 July 1999 in Lomé. There were preparations for the disarmament, demobilisation and reintegration of ex-combatants, including child soldiers. The Revolutionary United Front (RUF), Civil Defence Forces, former Sierra Leone Armed Forces/Armed Forces Revolutionary Council (AFRC) and all other armed groups were called upon to lay down their arms. Meanwhile, the Council deplored the taking of hostages, including personnel from the United Nations Observer Mission in Sierra Leone (UNOMSIL) and the Economic Community of West African States Monitoring Group (ECOMOG) by rebel groups.

The Security Council then established UNAMSIL for a period of six months with the following mandate:

(a) co-operate with the Sierra Leonean government and other parties to the Lomé Peace Accord;
(b) assist in disarmament, demobilisation and reintegration (of around 45,000 rebel troops);
(c) establish a presence at key locations in the country;
(d) ensure the safety and freedom of movement of United Nations personnel;
(e) monitor adherence to the agreed ceasefire;
(f) encourage the development of confidence-building mechanisms;
(g) facilitate the delivery of humanitarian assistance;
(h) support operations of United Nations personnel;
(i) provide support for elections in Sierra Leone.

The mission would consist of up to 6,000 troops including 260 military observers and would take over the tasks of the previous UNOMSIL operation which was terminated upon the establishment of UNAMSIL in addition to participating alongside ECOMOG. Furthermore, acting under Chapter VII of the United Nations Charter, the Council authorised the mission to take necessary measures for its own security to ensure the freedom of movement of its personnel and to protect civilians against direct threats.

The resolution also remarked that refugees should be able to return home, further humanitarian aid was essential and it was important to address the needs of children affected by the conflict. Finally, the Secretary-General Kofi Annan was requested to report every 45 days on the peace process.

== See also ==
- History of Sierra Leone
- List of United Nations Security Council Resolutions 1201 to 1300 (1998–2000)
- Sierra Leone Civil War
