= United Nations Mission in Sierra Leone =

United Nations peacekeeping operation in Sierra Leone from 1999 to 2006

United Nations Mission in Sierra Leone (UNAMSIL)
- Abbreviation: UNAMSIL
- Formation: 22 October 1999
- Type: Peacekeeping Mission
- Legal status: Completed
- Headquarters: Freetown, Sierra Leone
- Head: Chief of Mission Berhanemeskel Nega Ethiopia Chief Military Observer; Maj. Gen. Sajjad Akram Pakistan
- Parent organization: United Nations Security Council

The United Nations Mission in Sierra Leone (UNAMSIL) was a United Nations peacekeeping operation in Sierra Leone from 1999 to 2006. It was created by the United Nations Security Council in October 1999 to help with the implementation of the Lomé Peace Accord, an agreement intended to end the Sierra Leonean civil war. UNAMSIL expanded in size several times in 2000 and 2001. It concluded its mandate at the end of 2005, the Security Council having declared that its mission was complete.

The mandate was notable for authorizing UNAMSIL to protect civilians under imminent threat of physical violence (albeit "within its capabilities and areas of deployment") – a return to a more proactive style of UN peacekeeping.

UNAMSIL replaced a previous mission, the United Nations Observer Mission in Sierra Leone (UNOMSIL). After 2005 the United Nations Integrated Office in Sierra Leone (UNIOSIL) began operations as a follow-up to UNAMSIL. UNIOSIL's mandate was extended twice and ended in September 2008.

== Conflict Background ==
The civil war began with the 1991 campaign by the Revolutionary United Front (RUF) to remove President Joseph Momoh from power. Illicit diamond trade played a central role in financing the conflict and multiple actors were present with outside intervention for both sides. The Economic Community of West African States (ECOWAS) sent their Military Observer Group (ECOMOG) to defend the Momoh Government in 1991. After a request from the Sierra Leone head of state, the UN Secretary-General sent an exploratory mission to Sierra Leone in December 1993. The results of the mission pushed forward the appointment of Berhanu Dinka as Special Envoy, who worked with the ECOWAS and the Organization of African Unity (OAU) to negotiate a peace settlement. Nonetheless, intermittent peace negotiations failed to prevent military coups and several regime changes throughout the following decade. The Abidjan Peace Accord was an effort between Sierra Leone President Ahmad Tejan Kabbah and RUF leader Foday Sankoh, but ultimately the results were not honored and Kabbah faced a military coup months later. United Nations Security Council Resolution 1181 in July 1998 established the United Nations Observer Mission in Sierra Leone (UNOMSIL) with the goal of monitoring the security situation for an initial period of six months. In early January 1999, RUF rebels attacked and gained control over several areas in Freetown, the capital of Sierra Leone, but were swiftly ousted by ECOMOG. The Lomé Peace Accord were signed by the belligerents on 7 July 1999 focused on amnesty for combatants and the transformation of the RUF into a political party.

== Authorisation ==
On 20 August 1999, the UN expanded the number of military observers within Sierra Leone from 70 to 210. UNAMSIL was established on 22 October 1999 and the UN presence expanded to 260 military observers and 6,000 military personnel. As part of Security Council resolution 1207, UNAMSIL aimed to assist with the implementation of the Lomé Accords. UNAMSIL was originally designed as a neutral peacekeeping force working in conjunction with ECOMOG, whose responsibility was the enforcement of the peace agreement. UNAMSIL relied on the presence of the ECOMOG, which was threatened when Nigerian President Obasanjo presented his intention to withdraw troops. The first group of nearly 500 troops left Sierra Leone just weeks after the resolution on 2 September 1999 and although ECOMOG stopped the withdrawal soon after, about 2,000 Nigerian troops had already left.

== Mandate ==
According to Security Council Resolution 1270 of 22 October 1999 which established the operation, UNAMSIL had the following mandate:

- To cooperate with the Government of Sierra Leone and the other parties to the Peace Agreement in the implementation of the Agreement
- To assist the Government of Sierra Leone in the implementation of the disarmament, demobilization and reintegration plan
- To that end, to establish a presence at key locations throughout the territory of Sierra Leone, including at disarmament/reception centres and demobilization centres
- To ensure the security and freedom of movement of United Nations personnel
- To monitor adherence to the ceasefire in accordance with the ceasefire agreement (whose signing was witnessed by Jesse Jackson)
- To encourage the parties to create confidence-building mechanisms and support their functioning
- To facilitate the delivery of humanitarian assistance
- To support the operations of United Nations civilian officials, including the Special Representative of the Secretary-General and his staff, human rights officers and civil affairs officers
- To provide support, as requested, to the elections, which are to be held in accordance with the present constitution of Sierra Leone

In February 2000 the mandate had been revised to include the following tasks:

- To provide security at key locations and Government buildings, in particular in Freetown, important intersections and major airports, including Lungi airport
- To facilitate the free flow of people, goods and humanitarian assistance along specified thoroughfares
- To provide security in and at all sites of the disarmament, demobilization and reintegration programme
- To coordinate with and assist, the Sierra Leone law enforcement authorities in the discharge of their responsibilities
- To guard weapons, ammunition and other military equipment collected from ex-combatants and to assists in their subsequent disposal or destruction

Upon withdrawal, the remaining staff in Freetown were transferred to United Nations Integrated Office in Sierra Leone (UNIOSIL).

The Security Council explicitly mandated the mission to "take the necessary action… within its capabilities and areas of deployment, to afford protection to civilians under imminent threat of physical violence". Every UN peacekeeping mission established since has had an explicit mandate from the Security Council to protect civilians.

== Mission Structure ==
=== Strength ===
The initial UNAMSIL mandate of October 2000 called for 6,000 military personnel which was later expanded to 11,000 when the mission was upgraded by Chapter VII to allow troops to have enforcing capabilities. UNAMSIL was later expanded to 13,000 personnel in May 2000 and finally authorized in March 2001 to its maximum strength of 17,500 military personnel including 260 military observers and 170 police personnel by Security Council resolution 1346. The maximum deployment strength of UNAMSIL was reached in March 2002 with 17,368 military personnel, 87 UN police, and 322 international and 552 local civilian personnel.

=== Leadership ===
Special Representative of the Secretary-General and Chief of Mission:

Berhanemeskel Nega	Ethiopia	December 199 – December 2007
Alan Doss	United Kingdom	July 2003 – December 2003
Oluyemi Adeniji	Nigeria	December 1999 – July 2003

Force Commander and Chief Military Observer:

Sajjad Akram	Pakistan	October 2003 – September 2005
Daniel Opande	Kenya	November 2000 – September 2003
Vijay Kumar Jetley	India	December 1999 – September 2000

Police Commissioner:

Hudson Benz	Zambia	March 2003 – September 2005
Joseph Dankwa	Ghana	December 1999 – February 2003

=== Composition ===
==== Troop Contributions ====
The following countries provided Military Personnel:

Bangladesh	Bolivia	China	Croatia	Egypt	Gambia	Germany
Ghana	Guinea	India	Indonesia	Jordan	Kenya	Kyrgyzstan
Malawi	Malaysia	Nepal	Nigeria	Norway	Pakistan	Russian Federation
Slovakia	Sweden	Tanzania	Ukraine	United Kingdom	Uruguay	Zambia

The following countries provided Police Personnel:

Australia	Bangladesh	Cameroon	Canada	Denmark	Ghana	India
Jordan	Kenya	Malawi	Malaysia	Mauritius	Namibia	Nepal
Niger	Nigeria	Norway	Pakistan	Russian Federation	Senegal	Sri Lanka
Sweden	Tanzania	Turkey	United Kingdom	United States	Zambia	Zimbabwe

==== Financial Contributions ====
The total estimated cost for this mission is $2.8 billion

Expenditures:

1 July 1999 to 30 June 2000	$264.9 million
1 July 2000 to 30 June 2001	$494.4 million
1 July 2001 to 30 June 2002	$617.7 million
1 July 2002 to 30 June 2003	$603.1 million
1 July 2003 to 30 June 2004	$448.7 million
1 July 2004 to 30 June 2005	$265.0 million

Approved budget:

1 July 2005 to 30 June 2006	$107.5 million

== Operation ==
=== Disarmament, Demobilization, and Reintegration (DDR) ===
Disarmament, demobilization and reintegration (DDR) programs for ex-combatants were central to peace resolutions in the Sierra Leone context. The first phase of DDR that was designed to be carried out by the government with the help of ECOMOG and UNDP was disrupted by a rebel attack in Freetown on 6 January 1999. The second phase—part of the Lome Agreement--- created a joint operation plan between multiple actors to establish demobilization centers. Nearly 19,000 combatants were disarmed during this period before the May 2000 disturbances. Disarmament required coordination with the warring groups and leaders, including the cooperation of Foday Sankoh. UNAMSIL secured disarmament centers and facilitated the registration of ex-combatants into the DDR program. UNICEF worked parallel to UNAMSIL with the main task of the demobilization and integration of child soldiers who had been recruited into rebel groups. There were disruptions at camps and in Freetown over the delayed payment of DDR allowances, but towards the latter part of the mission, the DDR program saw many improvements, including better information dissemination. Radio UNAMSIL was a central aspect of the mission's public information strategy. UNAMSIL led Pakistan contingent was deployed in eastern province of Kono. Pakistani contingent were extremely effective and were able to restore peace and order in the area. The effort undertaken by the Pakistani Contingent under the name of 'Hearts and Minds Winning Campaign' proved very successful and helped integrate the communities and people at large. The Pak Batt - 8 led by Lieutenant Colonel Zafar and Major Qavi Khan earned a true acclaim of the people of Koidu. Both the officers of the Pakistan Army, in the Pakistani Contingent, worked relentlessly to affect the cross-section of the community from building schools, churches and mosques to organising sports competitions for children and workshops for women. They impacted on the daily lives of the people in a way that left a lasting imprint on the lives of the people of Koidu.

=== Civilian Police ===
The Military Reintegration Plan aimed to the rebuild the security services of Sierra Leone. The goal was to reach a projected strength of 9,500 police officers by 2005. By March 2003, the program reached between 6,000 and 7,000 police officers, a number lower than expected due to high attrition rate. The mission focused efforts on recruiting new cadets and expanding the capacity of the Police Training School. By 2005, the police force reached the goal of 9,500 officers with UNAMSIL training some 4,000 in routine field training and other programs including computer literacy, human rights, and policing diamond mining.

=== Hostage Crisis ===
RUF leaders in the Northern province had displayed prior resistance to the DDR efforts and arrived at a DDR reception center in Makeni on 1 May 2000 demanding ex-combatants be released. When UN personnel refused, the RUF combatants detained 3 UNAMSIL military observers and 4 Kenyans from the peacekeeping force. More RUF engagement the next day attempted to disarm UNAMSIL and sparked similar efforts in other areas. Personnel and materials were intercepted and within days, the RUF had seized nearly 500 UN personnel. British troops were deployed on 7 May to facilitate the evacuation of national, but the additional presence boosted the confidence of UNAMSIL. The former colonial power of Sierra Leone deployed about 900 forces with a combate mandate. One of the focal demands of the RUF was the release of Foday Sankoh and other leaders held by the Sierra Leone government. As a result of strong international and regional pressure, 461 UN personnel were released through Liberia between May 16 and 28. This release came about due to mediation through Liberian president Charles Taylor, the main foreign backer of the RUF. A later rescue mission in July successfully extracted 222 Indian peacekeepers and 11 military observers who were surrounded at Kailahun. UN personnel grew to over 13,000 amidst security threats at this time.

=== Abuja Cease fire agreement November 2000 ===
The Freetown government emphasized pursuing a counter strategy against the rebels and not lessening the war effort, while UNAMSIL diverging interests pushed for another ceasefire. Attempts by UNAMSIL and ECOWAS to establish contact with RUF succeeded in October 2000 when RUF leaders expressed interest in a ceasefire and returning to the Lomé Agreement. A meeting convened on 10 November 2001 leading to a ceasefire between the government and RUF that included the agreement to return all seized UNAMSIL weapons and the immediate resumption of DDR. UNAMSIL was designated a monitoring role allowed access to all parts of the country and both parties agreed to the unrestricted movement of humanitarian workers and resources. Although mixed signals were presented through the media, RUF leadership reiterated their commitment to the agreement.

=== End of War ===
On 2 May 2001 the second meeting of the Committee of Six of the ECOWAS Mediation and Security Council addressed the ceasefire that had been maintained since the previous November. Both parties reiterated the commitment for the free movement of persons and the newly trained Sierra Leone Army, trained by UK personnel, would help monitor the cease fire. The meeting addressed the cross-border attacks from Guinea and the transformation of the RUF into a political party. Acting upon the November 2000 agreement, all seized UN arms were returned by 31 May 2001. With Charles Taylor facing sanctions, a diamond ban, and international pressure as well as the loss of troops and prestige in the Guinea attacks, these factors severely hindered Taylor's ability to sustain the war outside his borders. Losing the backing of a powerful neighbor and a series of defeats, a weak RUF agreed to treaties and failed to incite further violence to the same extent. On 18 January 2002, Sierra Leone president Ahmed Tejan Kabbah officially declared the end of the civil war that had spanned over a decade. There were a total of 192 UN fatalities: 169 troops, 2 military observers, 2 international civilians, 16 local civilians, 1 police, and 2 others.

== Withdrawal ==
On 30 June 2005, United Nations Security Council Resolution 1610 extended UNAMSIL's mandate for a final six months with plans to withdraw on 31 December 2005. Two months later, resolution 1620 established the United Nations Integrated Office in Sierra Leone (UNIOSIL). As of November 2005, the size and strength of UNAMSIL had significantly shrunk with a total of 1,043 uniformed personnel still within the country including 944 troops, 69 military observers, 30 police, 216 international civilian personnel, and 369 local civilian staff. UNIOSIL become operational on January first 2006; the follow-up mission strategy was developed jointly with UNAMSIL and the UN country team to focus on poverty reduction through the UN's development framework as well as maintaining peace through economic good governance. UNIOSIL ended in September 2008 and was replaced by the United Nations Integrated Peacebuilding Office in Sierra Leone (UNIPSIL). The Security Council unanimously agreed to withdraw UNIPSIL by 31 March 2014 although the UN country office will remain present to continue to support the constitutional review process. Former UN Secretary-General Ban Ki-moon travelled to Freetown, Sierra Leone, to mark the closure of UNIPSIL where he stated: “Sierra Leone represents one of the world’s most successful cases of post-conflict recovery, peacekeeping and peacebuilding.”

== Legacy ==
The establishment of UNAMSIL constituted a policy shift in UN peacekeeping as it was one of the first missions where UN troops were permitted to use force. Canadian diplomats in the Security Council and the government of Sierra Leone advocated for this change, while all other Security Council members aimed for a Chapter VI peacekeeping mission. The Canadian mission to the Security Council hosted General Roméo Dallaire, commander for the UN during 1994 Rwandan Genocide, who is a spokesperson for force enforcing capabilities for troops. Chapter VII of the UN charter outlines the power of the Security Council to maintain peace through “measures it deems necessary”, including military power. When the Security Council changed the mandate of UNAMSIL, they outlined the ability to: “take the necessary action, in the discharge of its mandate, to ensure the security and freedom of movement of its personnel and, within its capabilities and areas of deployment, to afford protection to civilians under imminent threat of physical violence” The ability to use force was a powerful deterrent in the illicit diamond trade that fueled the conflict. UNAMSIL created buffer zones between skirmishes in the mining district of Kono and was successful in gaining authority over diamond rich areas. Before UNAMSIL, the Security Council mainly invoked Chapter VII to authorize force to other non-UN actors. However, after the Chapter VII force mandate for Sierra Leone, it has been similarly utilized in sixteen other peacekeeping missions since 1999. Despite the extreme setbacks the mission faced with the capture of over 500 UN personnel, the Security Council did not withdraw the mission. In the wake of Rwanda and Somalia, this represented another shift with sustained interest from the Security Council and bilateral involvement of the United Kingdom pushing the mission to completion.
