= United Nations Security Council Resolution 1330 =

United Nations Security Council resolution

UN Security Council Resolution 1330
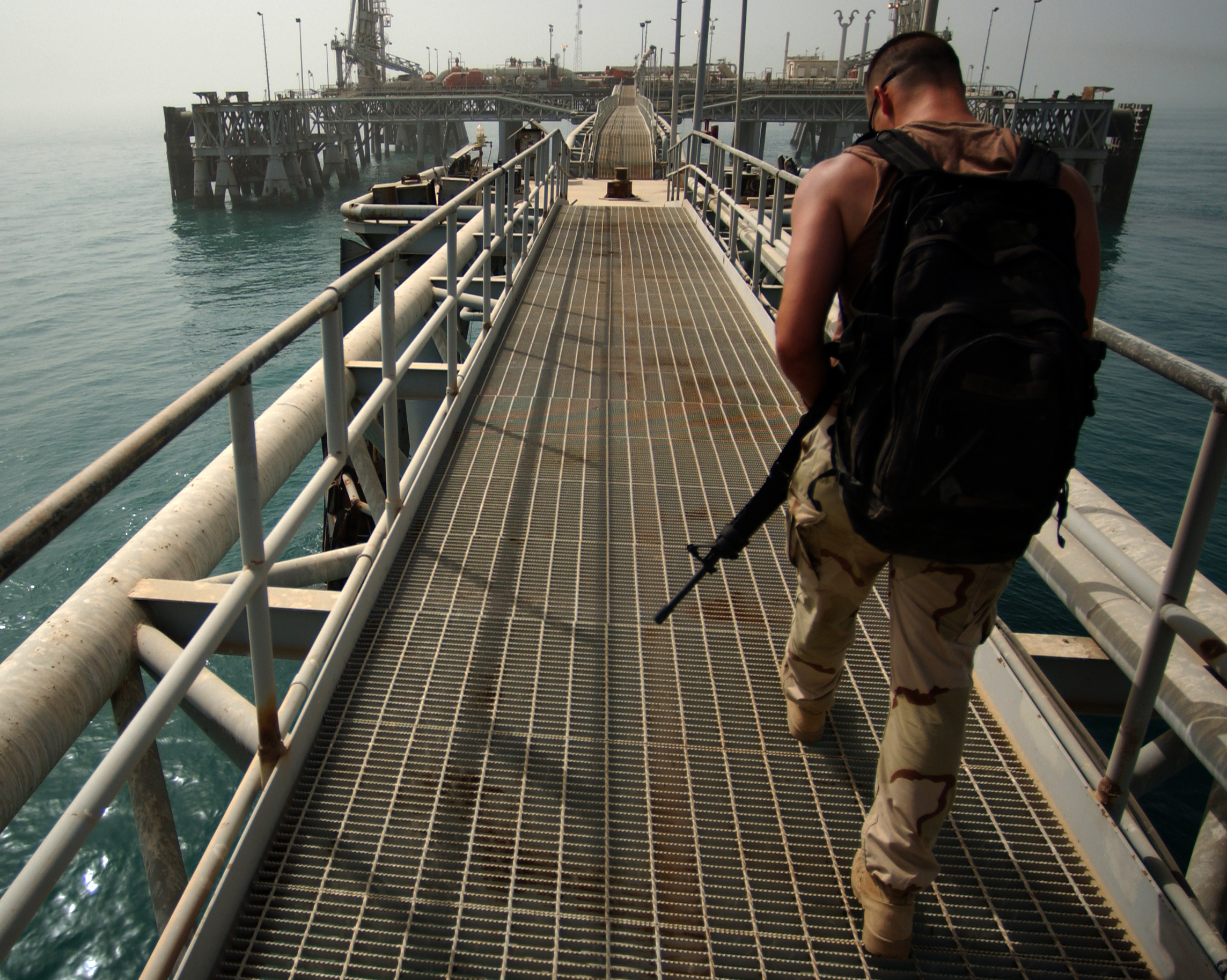
- Iraqi oil platform in the Persian Gulf
- Date: 5 December 2000
- Meeting no.: 4,241
- Code: S/RES/1330 (Document)
- Subject: The situation between Iraq and Kuwait
- Voting summary: 15 voted for; None voted against; None abstained
- Result: Adopted

Security Council composition
- Permanent members: China; France; Russia; United Kingdom; United States
- Non-permanent members: Argentina; Bangladesh; Canada; Jamaica; Malaysia; Mali; Namibia; Netherlands; Tunisia; Ukraine

United Nations Security Council resolution 1330, adopted unanimously on 5 December 2000, after recalling all previous resolutions on Iraq, including resolutions 986 (1995), 1111 (1997), 1129 (1997), 1143 (1997), 1153 (1998), 1175 (1998), 1210 (1998), 1242 (1999), 1266 (1999), 1275 (1999), 1280 (1999), 1281 (1999), 1293 (2000) and 1302 (2000) concerning the Oil-for-Food Programme, the Council extended provisions relating to the export of Iraqi petroleum or petroleum products in return for humanitarian aid for a further 180 days.

The security council was convinced of the need for a temporary measure to provide humanitarian assistance to the Iraqi people until the Iraqi government fulfilled the provisions of Resolution 687 (1991) and had distributed aid throughout the country equally.

Acting under Chapter VII of the United Nations Charter, the council extended the Oil-for-Food Programme for an additional six-month period beginning at 00:01 EST on 6 December 2000. The proceeds of the oil sales and other financial transactions would be allocated on a priority basis in the context of secretariat activities, of which 13% would be used for purposes referred to in Resolution 986. The council would consider allowing US$15 million to be withdrawn from the escrow account to be used for the payment of arrears in Iraq's contribution to the United Nations budget. Funds of up to €600 million deposited in the escrow account could also be used towards equipment and spare parts for the oil industry to increase production, subject to the council's approval. At the same time, money allocated to the United Nations Compensation Commission was reduced from 30% to 25%.

The resolution called upon all states to continue to co-operate in the prompt submission of applications and issue of export licences which would facilitate the transit of humanitarian supplies. It also appealed to countries to take all appropriate measures to ensure that humanitarian supplies reached the Iraqi people as soon as possible. Furthermore, the Iraqi government was asked to complete investigations into the deaths of employees from the Food and Agriculture Organization.

Finally, the Secretary-General Kofi Annan was requested to prepare a report by 31 March 2001 concerning the use of additional export routes for the oil.

== See also ==
- Foreign relations of Iraq
- Gulf War
- Invasion of Kuwait
- Iraq sanctions
- List of United Nations Security Council Resolutions 1301 to 1400 (2000–2002)
