= United Nations Security Council Resolution 1302 =

UN Security Council Resolution 1302
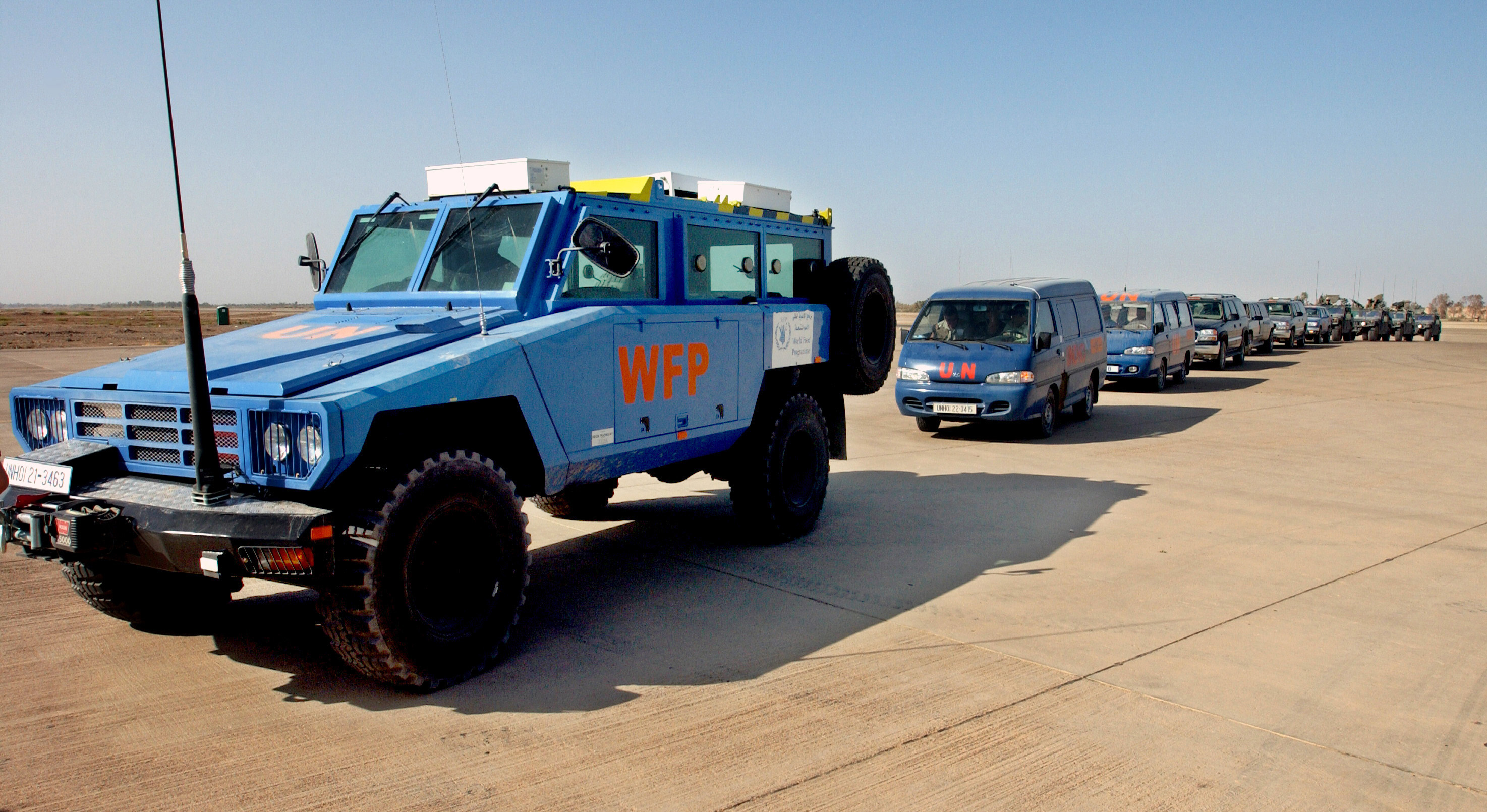
- World Food Programme vehicles in Iraq
- Date: 8 June 2000
- Meeting no.: 4,152
- Code: S/RES/1302 (Document)
- Subject: The situation between Iraq and Kuwait
- Voting summary: 15 voted for; None voted against; None abstained
- Result: Adopted

Security Council composition
- Permanent members: China; France; Russia; United Kingdom; United States
- Non-permanent members: Argentina; Bangladesh; Canada; Jamaica; Malaysia; Mali; Namibia; Netherlands; Tunisia; Ukraine

United Nations Security Council resolution 1302, adopted unanimously on 8 June 2000, after recalling all previous resolutions on Iraq, including resolutions 986 (1995), 1111 (1997), 1129 (1997), 1143 (1997), 1153 (1998), 1175 (1998), 1210 (1998), 1242 (1999), 1266 (1999), 1275 (1999), 1280 (1999), 1281 (1999) and 1293 (2000) concerning the Oil-for-Food Programme, the Council extended provisions relating to the export of Iraqi petroleum or petroleum products in return for humanitarian aid for a further 180 days.

The Security Council was convinced of the need for a temporary measure to provide humanitarian assistance to the Iraqi people until the Iraqi government fulfilled the provisions of Resolution 687 (1991) and had distributed aid throughout the country equally.

Acting under Chapter VII of the United Nations Charter, the Council extended the Oil-for-Food Programme for an additional six-month period beginning at 00:01 EST on 9 June 2000 and ending on 5 December 2000. The proceeds of the oil sales and other financial transactions would be allocated on a priority basis in the context of Secretariat activities, of which 13% would be used for purposes referred to in Resolution 986. Up to US$600 million also produced in the escrow account could be used to meet reasonable expenses other than those payable to Iraq.

The resolution, drafted by France and the United Kingdom, called upon all states to continue to co-operate in the prompt submission of applications and issue of export licences which would facilitate the transit of humanitarian supplies. It also appealed to countries to take all appropriate measures to ensure that humanitarian supplies reached the Iraqi people as soon as possible. An attempt by China and Russia to write into the resolution language that would have identified the United Nations sanctions as the sole cause of the situation in Iraq was defeated as Council members were informed that Iraq had made US$8.6 billion profit from oil sales in the previous six months.

The Secretary-General Kofi Annan was requested to appoint additional monitors to approve oil export contracts by 10 August 2000 and independent experts to prepare a report by 26 November 2000 on the humanitarian situation in Iraq.

== See also ==
- Foreign relations of Iraq
- Gulf War
- Invasion of Kuwait
- Sanctions against Iraq
- List of United Nations Security Council Resolutions 1301 to 1400 (2000–2002)
