= United Nations Security Council Resolution 1293 =

UN Security Council Resolution 1293
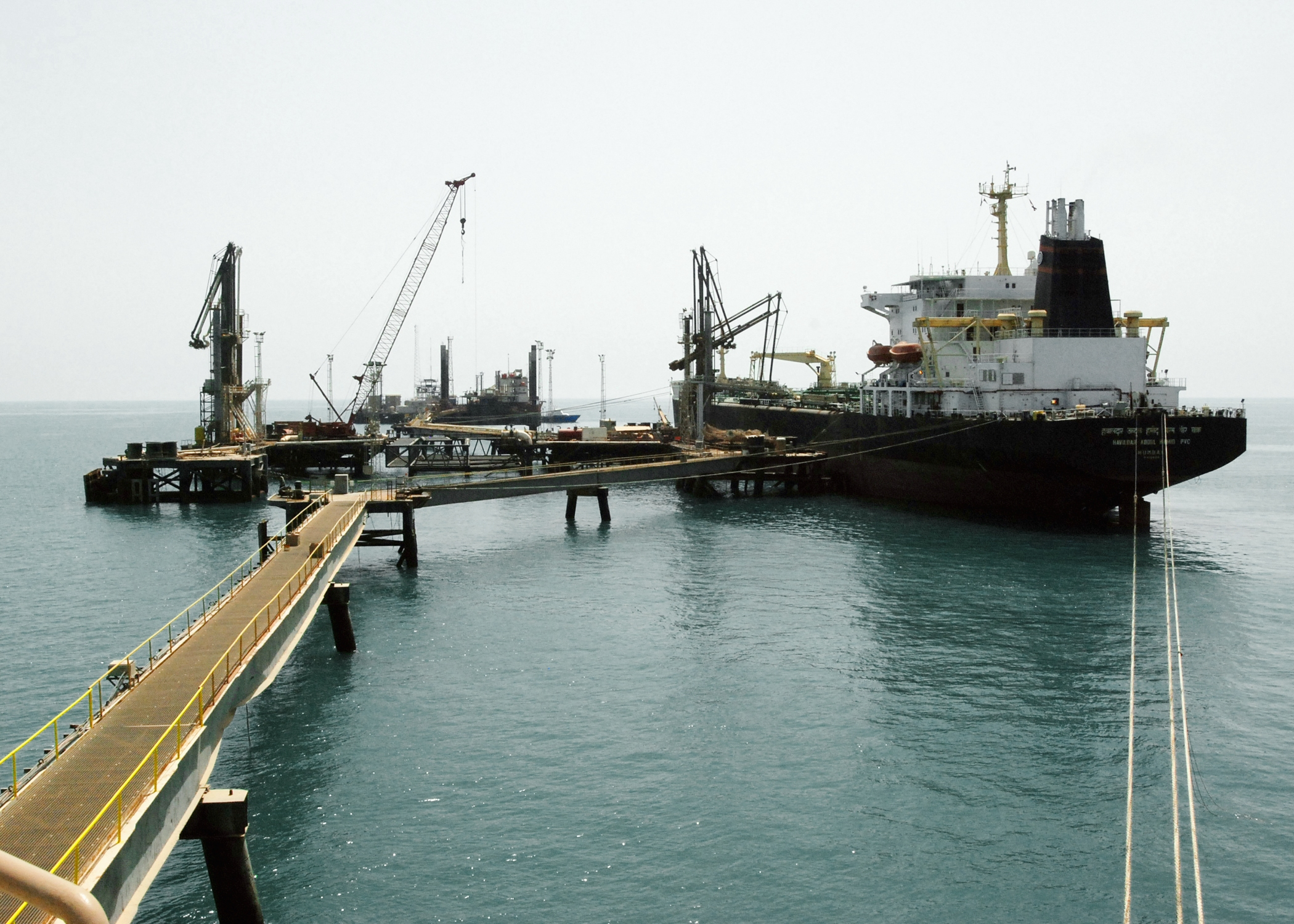
- Iraqi oil platform
- Date: 31 March 2000
- Meeting no.: 4,123
- Code: S/RES/1293 (Document)
- Subject: The situation between Iraq and Kuwait
- Voting summary: 15 voted for; None voted against; None abstained
- Result: Adopted

Security Council composition
- Permanent members: China; France; Russia; United Kingdom; United States
- Non-permanent members: Argentina; Bangladesh; Canada; Jamaica; Malaysia; Mali; Namibia; Netherlands; Tunisia; Ukraine

United Nations Security Council resolution 1293, adopted unanimously on 31 March 2000, after recalling all previous resolutions on Iraq, including resolutions 986 (1995), 1111 (1997), 1129 (1997), 1143 (1997), 1153 (1998), 1175 (1998), 1210 (1998), 1242 (1999), 1266 (1999), 1275 (1999), 1280 (1999), 1281 (1999) and 1284 (1999) concerning the Oil-for-Food Programme, the Council increased the amount of money that Iraq could use to purchase oil spare parts and equipment to US$600 million.

The Secretary-General Kofi Annan had been calling for the Security Council to raise the limit from US$300 million to US$600 million since late 1999. The resolution, enacted under Chapter VII of the United Nations Charter, also expressed willingness to consider the renewal of the provision and further recommendations of the Secretary-General.

== See also ==
- Foreign relations of Iraq
- Gulf War
- Invasion of Kuwait
- Sanctions against Iraq
- List of United Nations Security Council Resolutions 1201 to 1300 (1998–2000)
