= United Nations Security Council Resolution 1281 =

UN Security Council Resolution 1281
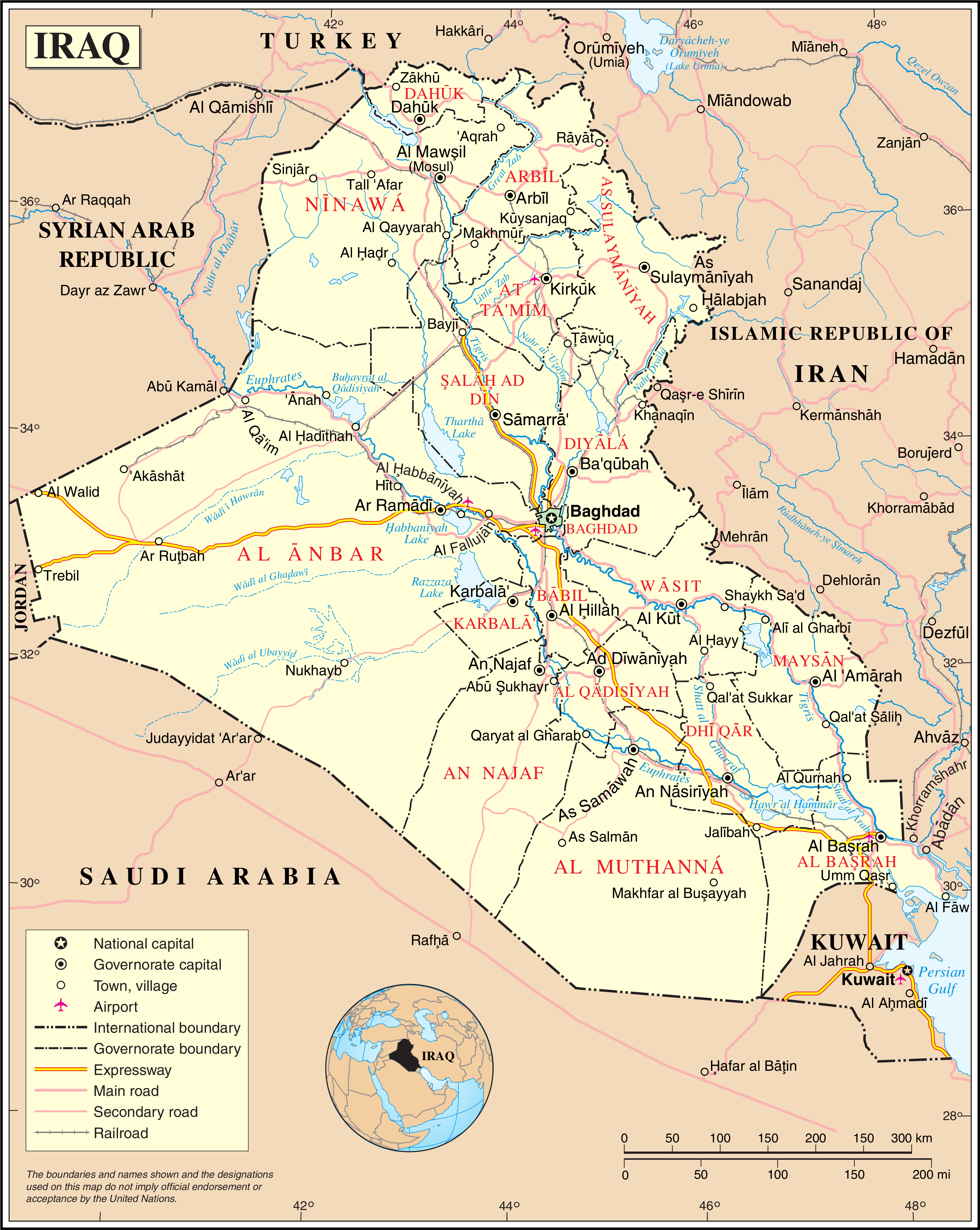
- Iraq
- Date: 10 December 1999
- Meeting no.: 4,079
- Code: S/RES/1281 (Document)
- Subject: The situation between Iraq and Kuwait
- Voting summary: 15 voted for; None voted against; None abstained
- Result: Adopted

Security Council composition
- Permanent members: China; France; Russia; United Kingdom; United States
- Non-permanent members: Argentina; Bahrain; Brazil; Canada; Gabon; Gambia; Malaysia; Namibia; Netherlands; Slovenia

United Nations Security Council resolution 1281, adopted unanimously on 10 December 1999, after recalling all previous resolutions on Iraq, including resolutions 986 (1995), 1111 (1997), 1129 (1997), 1143 (1997), 1153 (1998), 1175 (1998), 1210 (1998), 1242 (1999), 1266 (1999), 1275 (1999) and 1280 (1999) concerning the Oil-for-Food Programme, the council extended provisions relating to the export of Iraqi petroleum or petroleum products sufficient to produce up to US$5.256 billion worth of oil for a further 180 days.

The security council was convinced of the need for a temporary measure to provide humanitarian assistance to the Iraqi people until the Iraqi government fulfilled the provisions of Resolution 687 (1991) and had distributed aid throughout the country equally.

Acting under Chapter VII of the United Nations Charter, the council extended the Oil-for-Food Programme for an additional six-month period beginning at 00:01 EST on 12 December 1999 with the provisions of Resolution 1153 remaining in effect. The Council kept the maximum amount of petroleum Iraq could export at 5.256 billion U.S. dollars.

Finally, the Secretary-General Kofi Annan was requested to report back to the council by 15 January 2000 on whether Iraq was able to produce the 5.256 billion US dollars' worth of oil to export and to submit a detailed list of equipment that countries were providing to help Iraq increase exports to finance humanitarian aid. He was also instructed to enhance the observation process in Iraq to ensure that the aid was distributed equally amongst all segments of the population and that all equipment was being used as authorised.

== See also ==
- Foreign relations of Iraq
- Gulf War
- Invasion of Kuwait
- Iraq sanctions
- List of United Nations Security Council Resolutions 1201 to 1300 (1998–2000)
