= United Nations Security Council Resolution 1454 =

UN Security Council Resolution 1454
- Iraq
- Date: 30 December 2002
- Meeting no.: 4,683
- Code: S/RES/1454 (Document)
- Subject: The situation between Iraq and Kuwait
- Voting summary: 13 voted for; None voted against; 2 abstained
- Result: Adopted

Security Council composition
- Permanent members: China; France; Russia; United Kingdom; United States
- Non-permanent members: Bulgaria; Cameroon; Colombia; Guinea; Ireland; Mauritius; Mexico; Norway; Singapore; Syria

United Nations Security Council resolution 1454, adopted on 30 December 2002, after recalling all previous resolutions on Iraq, including resolutions 661 (1991), 986 (1995), 1284 (1999), 1352 (2001), 1360 (2001), 1382 (2001), 1409 (2002) and 1447 (2002) concerning the Oil-for-Food Programme, the council adjusted the list of restricted goods (Goods Review List) and procedures for its implementation under the Oil-for-Food Programme. It was the final Security Council resolution adopted in 2002.

The security council was convinced of the need for a temporary measure to provide humanitarian assistance to the Iraqi people until the Iraqi government fulfilled the provisions of Resolution 687 (1991) and 1284, and had distributed aid throughout the country equally. It reaffirmed the commitment of all states to Iraq's sovereignty and territorial integrity, its determination to improve the humanitarian situation and pledge to adjust the Goods Review List.

Acting under Chapter VII of the United Nations Charter, the council adjusted the Goods Review List and procedures for its implementation. More than 50 items were added to the Goods Review List. It would conduct a review of the measures within 90 days and before the end of the current extension of the Oil-for-Food Programme, while the committee established in Resolution 661 was also requested to conduct reviews. The Secretary-General Kofi Annan was instructed to develop consumption rates and use levels for chemicals and medications specified in the annexes of the resolution within 60 days. Finally, the resolution appealed to all states to co-operate in the timely submission of technically complete applications and the issuing of export licences.

Resolution 1454 was adopted by 13 votes to none against and two abstentions from Russia and Syria. Russia opposed the "restrictive" nature of the text while Syria noted that Iraq had begun complying with weapons inspections and regretted that the speed of negotiations resulting in the adoption of the current resolution did not allow enough time for examining the list.

== See also ==
- Foreign relations of Iraq
- Gulf War
- Invasion of Kuwait
- Iraq disarmament crisis
- Iraq disarmament timeline 1990–2003
- Sanctions against Iraq
- List of United Nations Security Council Resolutions 1401 to 1500 (2002–2003)
