= United Nations Security Council Resolution 1443 =

UN Security Council Resolution 1443
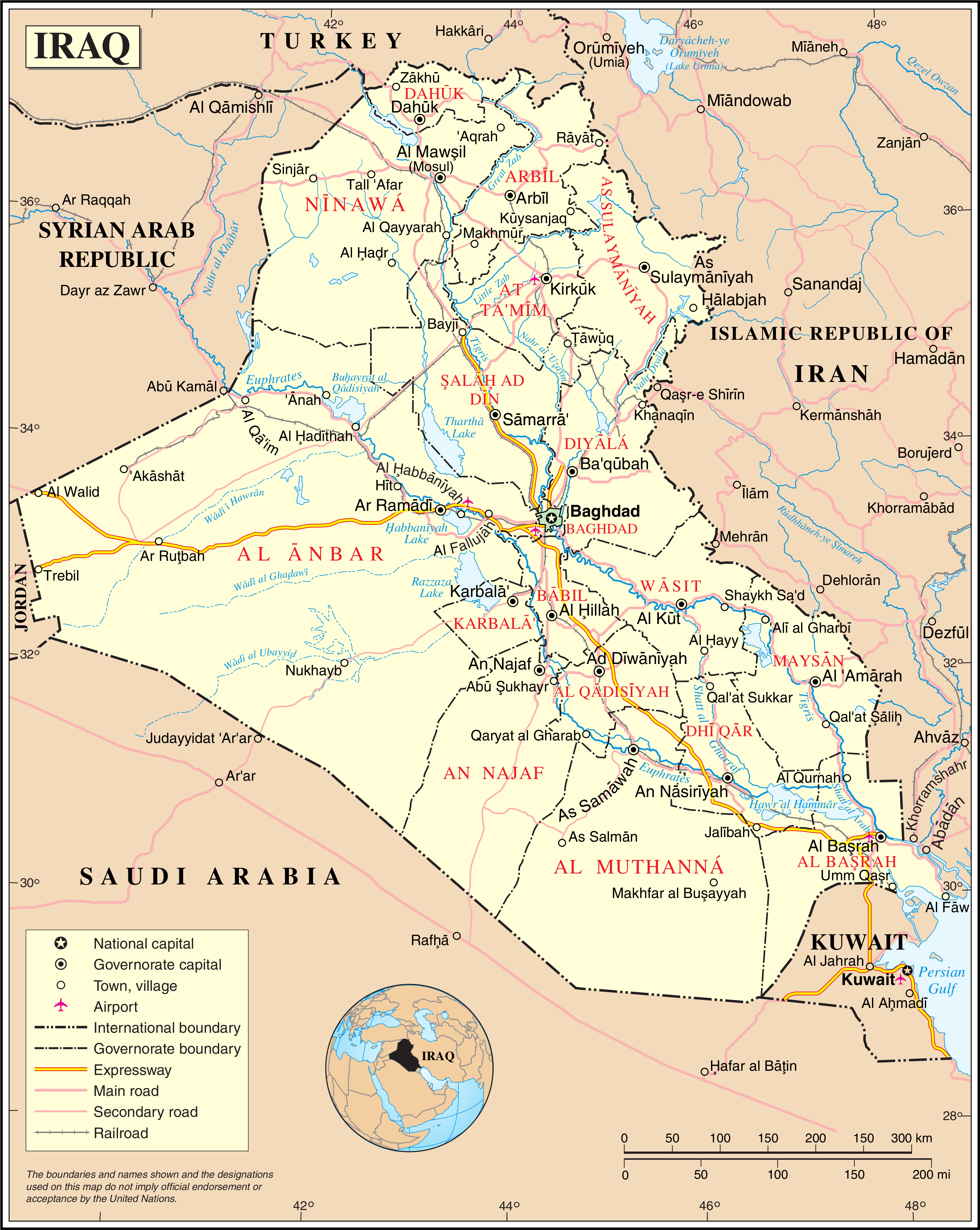
- Iraq
- Date: 25 November 2002
- Meeting no.: 4,650
- Code: S/RES/1443 (Document)
- Subject: The situation between Iraq and Kuwait
- Voting summary: 15 voted for; None voted against; None abstained
- Result: Adopted

Security Council composition
- Permanent members: China; France; Russia; United Kingdom; United States
- Non-permanent members: Bulgaria; Cameroon; Colombia; Guinea; Ireland; Mauritius; Mexico; Norway; Singapore; Syria

United Nations Security Council resolution 1443, adopted unanimously on 25 November 2002, after recalling all previous resolutions on Iraq, including resolutions 986 (1995), 1284 (1999), 1352 (2001), 1360 (2001), 1382 (2001) and 1409 (2002) concerning the Oil-for-Food Programme. The council, acting under Chapter VII of the United Nations Charter, extended provisions relating to the export of Iraqi petroleum or petroleum products in return for humanitarian aid until 4 December 2002.

The security council was convinced of the need for a temporary measure to provide humanitarian assistance to the Iraqi people until the Iraqi government fulfilled the provisions of Resolution 687 (1991) and 1284, and had distributed aid throughout the country equally. It also reaffirmed the commitment of all states to Iraq's sovereignty and territorial integrity.

The Oil-for-Food Programme was then extended for a period of nine days (phase 12) before further renewal. The extension was granted to allow for more time for diplomats to debate an extension of either six months or 90 days.

== See also ==
- Foreign relations of Iraq
- Gulf War
- Invasion of Kuwait
- Sanctions against Iraq
- List of United Nations Security Council Resolutions 1401 to 1500 (2002–2003)
