= United Nations Security Council Resolution 1447 =

UN Security Council Resolution 1447
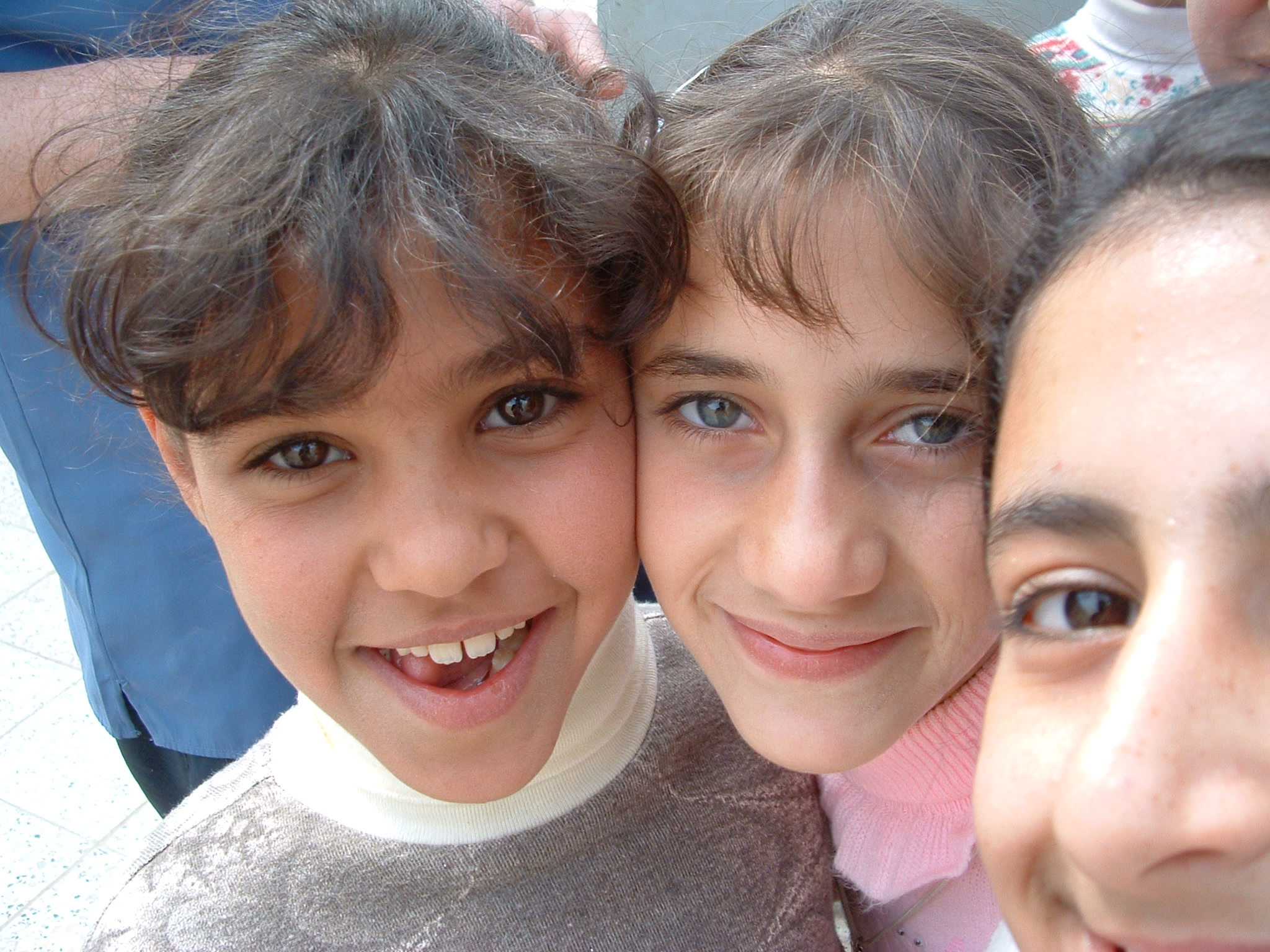
- Iraqi children living next to oil refinery in Baghdad
- Date: 4 December 2002
- Meeting no.: 4,656
- Code: S/RES/1447 (Document)
- Subject: The situation between Iraq and Kuwait
- Voting summary: 15 voted for; None voted against; None abstained
- Result: Adopted

Security Council composition
- Permanent members: China; France; Russia; United Kingdom; United States
- Non-permanent members: Bulgaria; Cameroon; Colombia; Guinea; Ireland; Mauritius; Mexico; Norway; Singapore; Syria

United Nations Security Council resolution 1447, adopted unanimously on 4 December 2002, after recalling all previous resolutions on Iraq, including resolutions 986 (1995), 1284 (1999), 1352 (2001), 1360 (2001), 1382 (2001) and 1409 (2002) concerning the Oil-for-Food Programme, the council, acting under Chapter VII of the United Nations Charter, extended provisions relating to the export of Iraqi petroleum or petroleum products in return for humanitarian aid for an additional 180 days.

The Security Council was convinced of the need for a temporary measure to provide humanitarian assistance to the Iraqi people until the Iraqi government fulfilled the provisions of Resolution 687 (1991) and 1284, and had distributed aid throughout the country equally. It reaffirmed the commitment of all states to Iraq's sovereignty and territorial integrity and its determination to improve the humanitarian situation.

Acting under Chapter VII of the United Nations Charter, the Oil-for-Food Programme, in its thirteenth stage, was extended for a further 180 days beginning at 00:01 EST on 5 December 2002. Adjustments to the Goods Review List would be considered and decided upon within 30 days of the adoption of the current resolution. The Secretary-General Kofi Annan was requested to report by the end of 180 days on whether the Iraqi government had distributed aid equally, and an assessment of the implementation of the Goods Review List.

The United States had withdrawn a draft resolution requesting an additional 14-day extension of the programme while further discussions could take place regarding changes to the Goods List.

== See also ==
- Foreign relations of Iraq
- Gulf War
- Invasion of Kuwait
- Iraq sanctions
- List of United Nations Security Council Resolutions 1401 to 1500 (2002–2003)
