= United Nations Security Council Resolution 1158 =

UN Security Council Resolution 1158
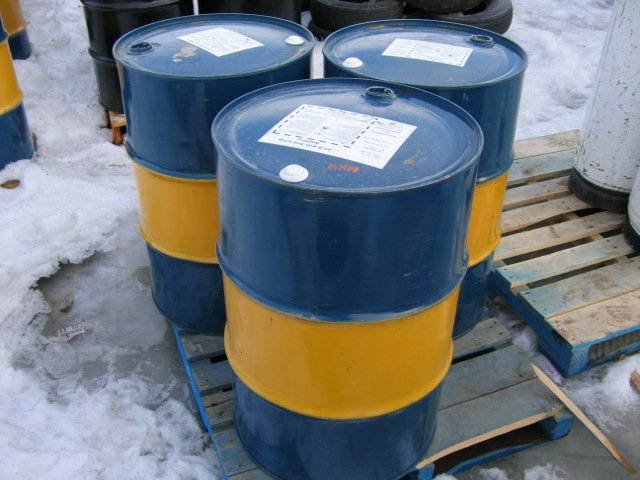
- Oil barrels
- Date: 25 March 1998
- Meeting no.: 3,865
- Code: S/RES/1158 (Document)
- Subject: The situation between Iraq and Kuwait
- Voting summary: 15 voted for; None voted against; None abstained
- Result: Adopted

Security Council composition
- Permanent members: China; France; Russia; United Kingdom; United States
- Non-permanent members: Bahrain; Brazil; Costa Rica; Gabon; Gambia; Japan; Kenya; Portugal; Slovenia; Sweden

United Nations Security Council resolution 1158, adopted unanimously on 25 March 1998, after recalling all previous resolutions on Iraq, including resolutions 986 (1995), 1111 (1997), 1129 (1997), 1143 (1997) and 1153 (1998) concerning the Oil-for-Food Programme, the council, acting under Chapter VII of the United Nations Charter, authorised the sale of up to 1.4 billion United States dollars of Iraqi oil and oil products within a 90-day period, beginning from 5 March 1998.

The security council was concerned about the humanitarian consequences for the Iraqi people after the shortfall in the revenue from the sale of petroleum and petroleum products during the first 90-day period of implementation of Resolution 1143, due to a fall in oil prices and delayed resumption of oil sales by Iraq. It was determined to avoid the further deterioration of the humanitarian situation.

Acting under Chapter VII, the council decided that the mechanism whereby Iraqi oil exports, would finance humanitarian aid for a further 90 days, beginning at 00:01 EST on 5 March 1998. The sum of the sales could not exceed US$1.4 billion in the 90-day period.

== See also ==
- Foreign relations of Iraq
- Gulf War
- Invasion of Kuwait
- Iraq sanctions
- List of United Nations Security Council Resolutions 1101 to 1200 (1997–1998)
