= United Nations Security Council Resolution 1409 =

UN Security Council Resolution 1409
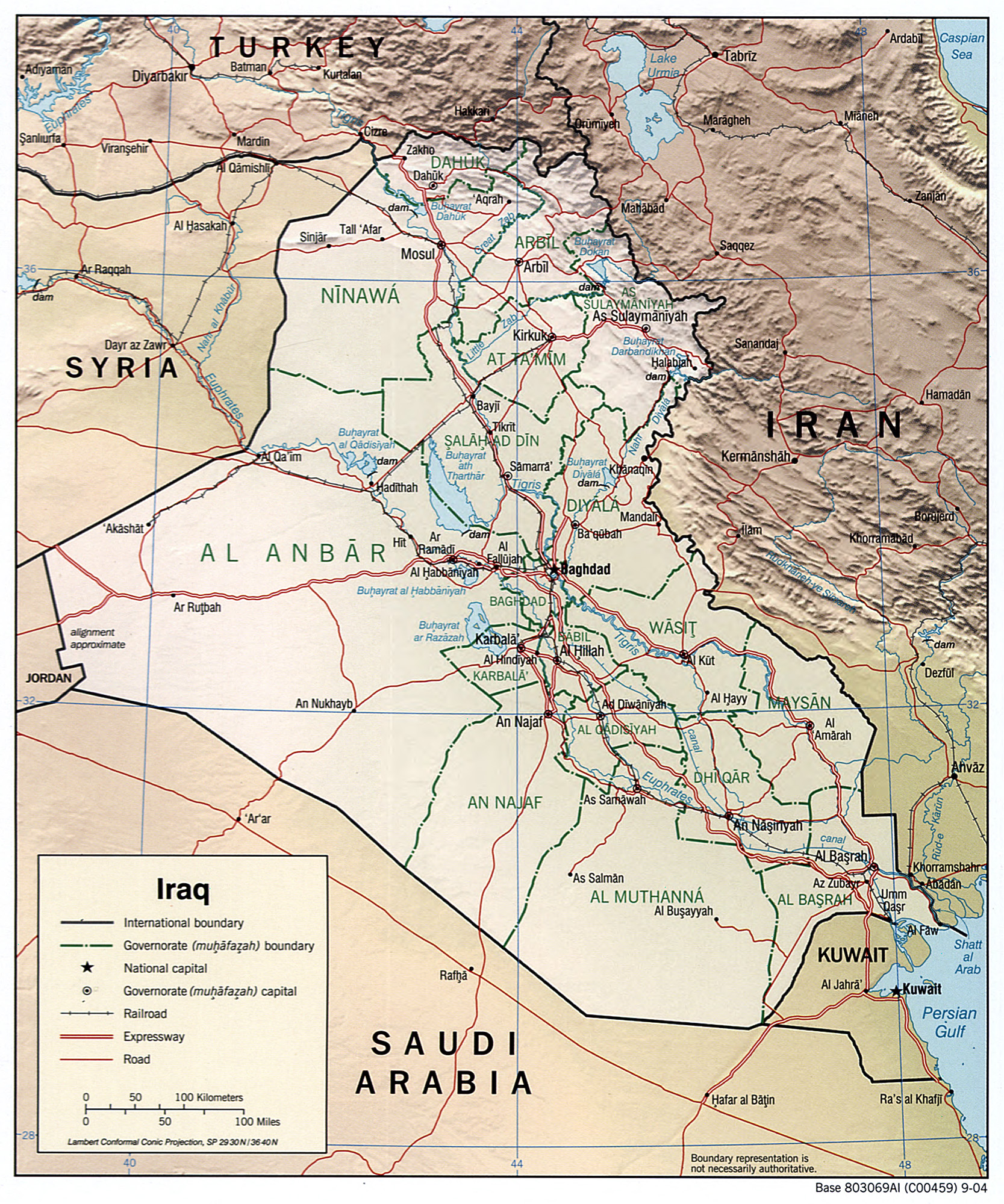
- Iraq
- Date: 14 May 2002
- Meeting no.: 4,531
- Code: S/RES/1409 (Document)
- Subject: The situation between Iraq and Kuwait
- Voting summary: 15 voted for; None voted against; None abstained
- Result: Adopted

Security Council composition
- Permanent members: China; France; Russia; United Kingdom; United States
- Non-permanent members: Bulgaria; Cameroon; Colombia; Guinea; Ireland; Mauritius; Mexico; Norway; Singapore; Syria

United Nations Security Council resolution 1409, adopted unanimously on 14 May 2002, after recalling all previous resolutions on Iraq, including resolutions 986 (1995), 1284 (1999), 1352 (2001), 1360 (2001) and 1382 (2001) concerning the Oil-for-Food Programme, the Council extended provisions relating to the export of Iraqi petroleum or petroleum products in return for humanitarian aid for a further 180 days and approved a list of revised sanctions against the country. Its adoption streamlined the sanctions program, with restrictions on shipping civilian goods to Iraq lifted though prohibitions on weapons and military goods remained.

The Security Council was convinced of the need for a temporary measure to provide humanitarian assistance to the Iraqi people until the Iraqi government fulfilled the provisions of Resolution 687 (1991) and 1284, and had distributed aid throughout the country equally. It noted that the decision to adopt a Goods Review List in Resolution 1382 that was to come into effect from 30 May 2002.

Acting under Chapter VII of the United Nations Charter, the Council extended the Oil-for-Food Programme for 180 days beginning at 00:01 EST on 30 May 2002. At the same time, countries were to adopt the Goods Review List of restricted items and that funds in the escrow account would be used to finance authorised commodities and products for export to Iraq. Reviews of the Goods Review List and implementation of the measures would take place on a regular basis. The Secretary-General Kofi Annan was required to submit an assessment of the implementation of the Goods Review List.

Enclosed in the resolution were revised procedures relating to the review of applications for exports to Iraq by the Office of the Iraq Programme, United Nations Monitoring, Verification and Inspection Commission and International Atomic Energy Agency. Applications had to contain detailed information about the goods and commodities to be exported, including whether the goods or commodities included items on the Goods Review List.

Resolution 1409 was adopted unanimously although Syria sought to include a reference relating to Iraq's right to defend itself, though this was rejected.

== See also ==
- Foreign relations of Iraq
- Gulf War
- Invasion of Kuwait
- Iraq disarmament timeline 1990–2003
- Iraq and weapons of mass destruction
- Sanctions against Iraq
- List of United Nations Security Council Resolutions 1401 to 1500 (2002–2003)
