= United Nations Security Council Resolution 1266 =

UN Security Council Resolution 1266
- Humanitarian delivery to Iraq
- Date: 4 October 1999
- Meeting no.: 4,050
- Code: S/RES/1266 (Document)
- Subject: The situation between Iraq and Kuwait
- Voting summary: 15 voted for; None voted against; None abstained
- Result: Adopted

Security Council composition
- Permanent members: China; France; Russia; United Kingdom; United States
- Non-permanent members: Argentina; Bahrain; Brazil; Canada; Gabon; Gambia; Malaysia; Namibia; Netherlands; Slovenia

United Nations Security Council resolution 1266, adopted unanimously on 4 October 1999, after recalling all previous resolutions on Iraq, including resolutions 986 (1995), 1111 (1997), 1129 (1997), 1143 (1997), 1153 (1998), 1175 (1998), 1210 (1998) and 1242 (1999) concerning the Oil-for-Food Programme, the Council increased the limit on the amount of oil Iraq could export to 3.04 billion United States dollars for the current 180-day period which began on 25 May 1999.

The Security Council was determined to improve the humanitarian situation in Iraq and, acting under Chapter VII of the United Nations Charter, increased the limit of oil that Iraq could export beyond the prior authorised limit, which had previously been US$5.26 billion within a 180-day period.

== See also ==
- Foreign relations of Iraq
- Gulf War
- Invasion of Kuwait
- Sanctions against Iraq
- List of United Nations Security Council Resolutions 1201 to 1300 (1998–2000)
