= United Nations Security Council Resolution 1382 =

UN Security Council Resolution 1382
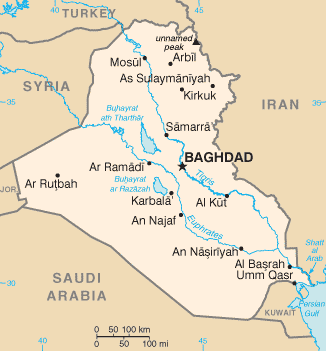
- Iraq
- Date: 29 November 2001
- Meeting no.: 4,431
- Code: S/RES/1382 (Document)
- Subject: The situation between Iraq and Kuwait
- Voting summary: 15 voted for; None voted against; None abstained
- Result: Adopted

Security Council composition
- Permanent members: China; France; Russia; United Kingdom; United States
- Non-permanent members: Bangladesh; Colombia; Ireland; Jamaica; Mali; Mauritius; Norway; Singapore; Tunisia; Ukraine

United Nations Security Council resolution 1382, adopted unanimously on 29 November 2001, after recalling all previous resolutions on Iraq, including resolutions 986 (1995), 1284 (1999), 1352 (2001) and 1360 (2001) concerning the Oil-for-Food Programme, the Council extended provisions relating to the export of Iraqi petroleum or petroleum products in return for humanitarian aid for a further 180 days.

The Security Council was convinced of the need for a temporary measure to provide humanitarian assistance to the Iraqi people until the Iraqi government fulfilled the provisions of Resolution 687 (1991) and had distributed aid throughout the country equally.

Acting under Chapter VII of the United Nations Charter, the Council extended the Oil-for-Food Programme for 180 days beginning at 00:01 EST on 1 December 2001. It reaffirmed the obligation of all countries of the arms embargo on Iraq and other resources unauthorised by the council. It also stressed the need for Iraq to co-operate with previous Security Council resolutions and the need for a comprehensive settlement on the basis of the resolutions. The resolution also appealed for all countries to co-operate in the submission of applications and issue of export licences so that humanitarian aid could reach the Iraqi population as soon as possible.

Additionally under Resolution 1382, the Council adopted a proposed Goods Review List (contained in Annex I of the resolution) for implementation from 30 May 2002. Items on the list would be subject to procedures contained in Annex II of the resolution and approval from the Sanctions Committee and United Nations Monitoring, Verification and Inspection Commission after an assessment had been made that such goods would not be used for military purposes.

The adoption of the resolution represented a closer alignment of Russian policy towards the United States after the latter pledged to review sanctions against Iraq.

== See also ==
- Foreign relations of Iraq
- Gulf War
- Invasion of Kuwait
- Iraq disarmament timeline 1990–2003
- Iraq and weapons of mass destruction
- Iraq sanctions
- List of United Nations Security Council Resolutions 1301 to 1400 (2000–2002)
