= United Nations Security Council Resolution 1360 =

UN Security Council Resolution 1360
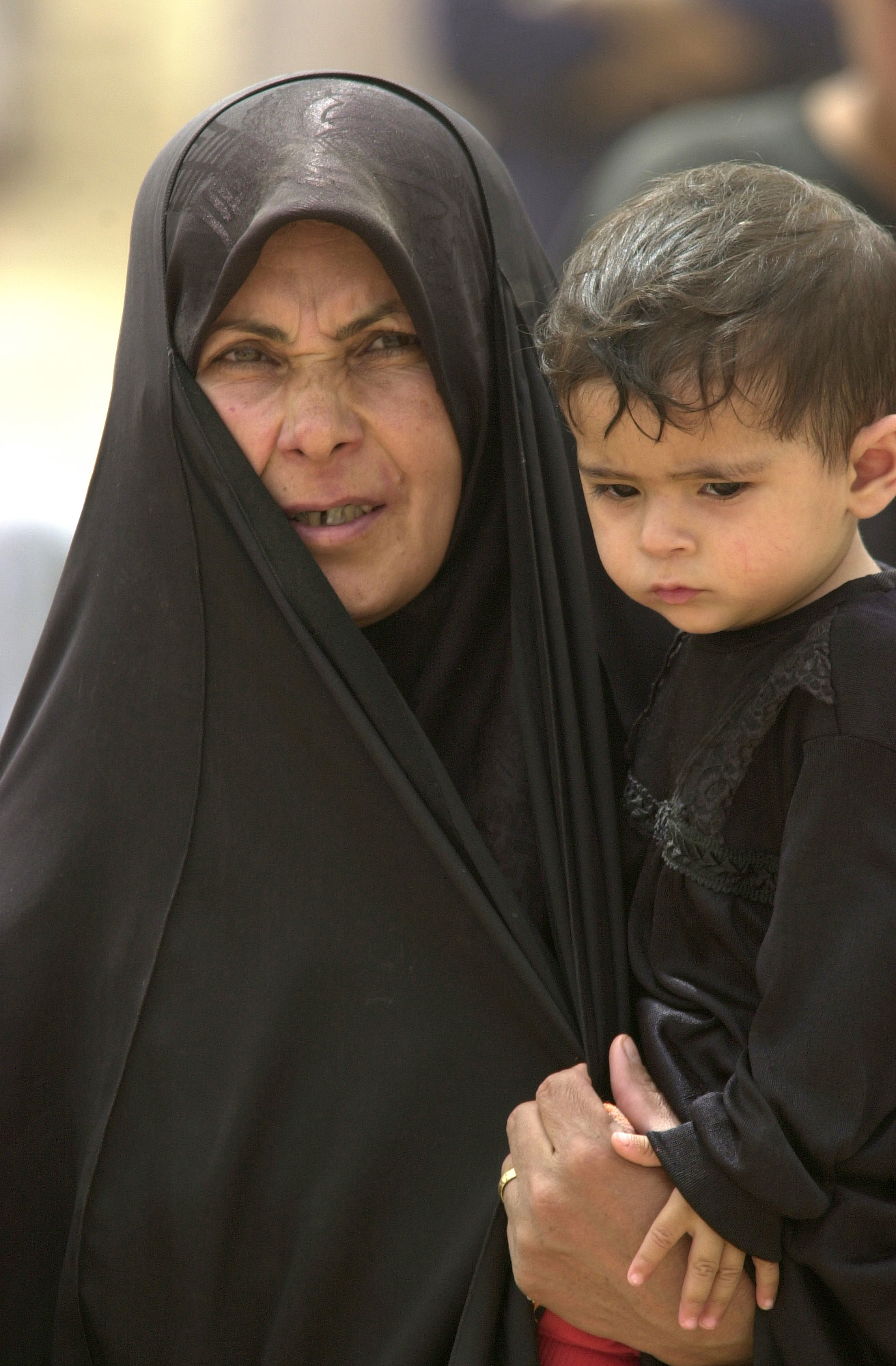
- Iraqi woman and child waiting for humanitarian aid
- Date: 3 July 2001
- Meeting no.: 4,344
- Code: S/RES/1360 (Document)
- Subject: The situation between Iraq and Kuwait
- Voting summary: 15 voted for; None voted against; None abstained
- Result: Adopted

Security Council composition
- Permanent members: China; France; Russia; United Kingdom; United States
- Non-permanent members: Bangladesh; Colombia; Ireland; Jamaica; Mali; Mauritius; Norway; Singapore; Tunisia; Ukraine

United Nations Security Council resolution 1360, adopted unanimously on 3 July 2001, after recalling all previous resolutions on Iraq, including resolutions 986 (1995), 1284 (1999), 1330 (2000) and 1352 (2001) concerning the Oil-for-Food Programme, the Council extended provisions relating to the export of Iraqi petroleum or petroleum products in return for humanitarian aid for a further 150 days.

The Security Council was convinced of the need for a temporary measure to provide humanitarian assistance to the Iraqi people until the Iraqi government fulfilled the provisions of Resolution 687 (1991) and had distributed aid throughout the country equally.

Acting under Chapter VII of the United Nations Charter, the Council extended the Oil-for-Food Programme for 150 days beginning at 00:01 EST on 4 July 2001. The proceeds of the oil sales and other financial transactions would be allocated on a priority basis in the context of Secretariat activities, of which 13% would be used for purposes referred to in Resolution 986. The Secretary-General Kofi Annan was requested to ensure the effective implementation of the current resolution and report within 90 days. The Committee of the Security Council tasked with monitoring the process was also asked to submit a report.

The resolution decided that funds produced in the escrow account up to a total of US$600 million could be used to meet reasonable expenses other than those payable to Iraq, such as equipment to increase oil exports and costs for essential civilian needs. The effective deduction rate of funds deposited in the escrow account transferable to the United Nations Compensation Commission would be 25% and additional funds deposited into an account for humanitarian reasons.

Finally, the Council concluded by urging full compliance with the current resolution and appealed for all countries to co-operate in the submission of applications and issue of export licences.

== See also ==
- Foreign relations of Iraq
- Gulf War
- Invasion of Kuwait
- Sanctions against Iraq
- List of United Nations Security Council Resolutions 1301 to 1400 (2000–2002)
