= United Nations Security Council Resolution 1280 =

UN Security Council Resolution 1280
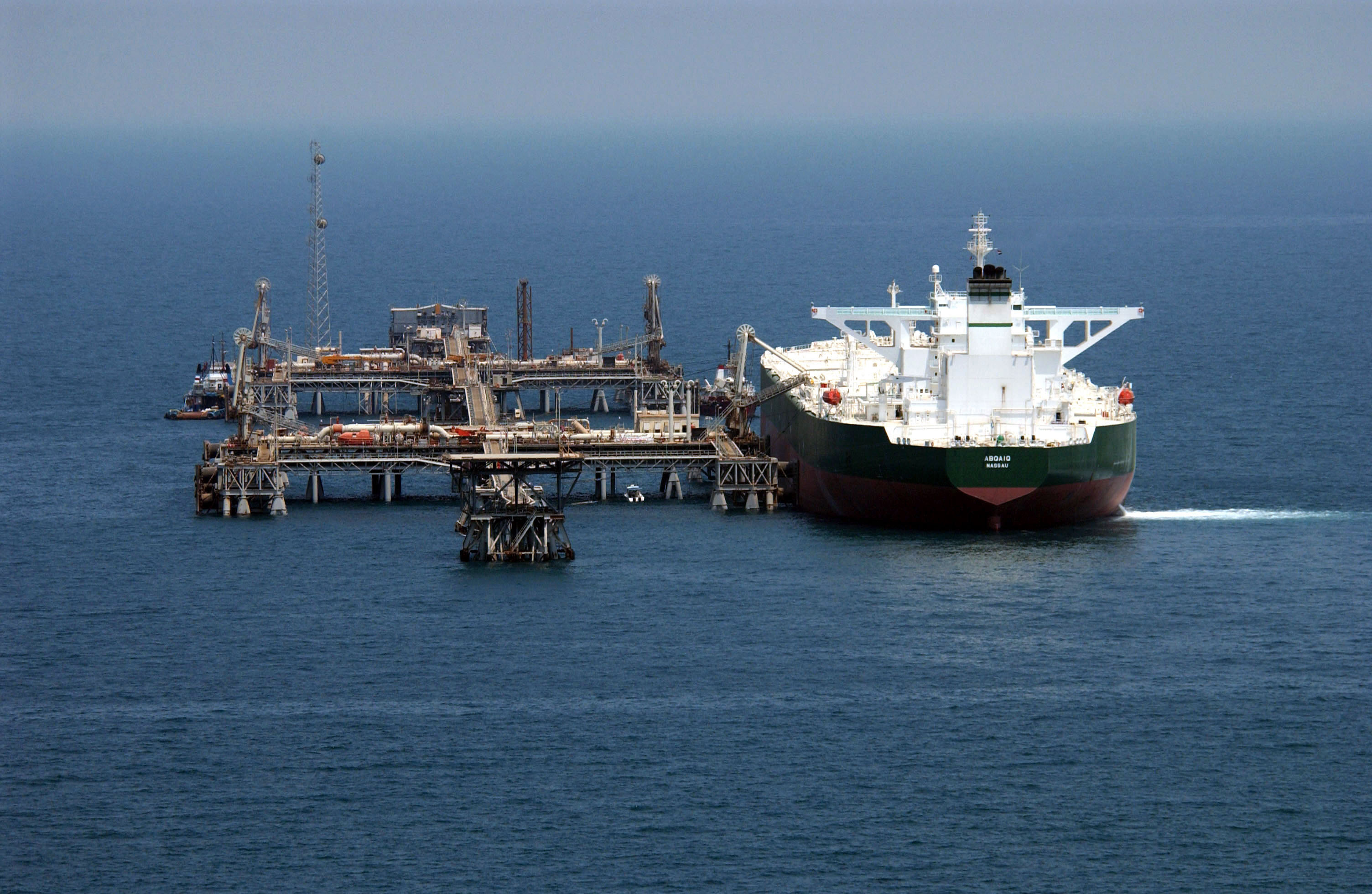
- Offshore Iraqi oil terminal
- Date: 3 December 1999
- Meeting no.: 4,077
- Code: S/RES/1280 (Document)
- Subject: The situation between Iraq and Kuwait
- Voting summary: 11 voted for; None voted against; 3 abstained
- Result: Adopted

Security Council composition
- Permanent members: China; France; Russia; United Kingdom; United States
- Non-permanent members: Argentina; Bahrain; Brazil; Canada; Gabon; Gambia; Malaysia; Namibia; Netherlands; Slovenia

United Nations Security Council resolution 1280, adopted on 3 December 1999, after recalling resolutions 1242 (1999), 1266 (1999) and 1275 (1999) concerning the Oil-for-Food Programme, the council, acting under Chapter VII of the United Nations Charter, extended provisions relating to the export of Iraqi petroleum or petroleum products in return for humanitarian aid for one week until 11 December 1999.

Resolution 1280 was adopted by 11 votes in favour and none against with three abstentions from China, Malaysia and Russia; France did not participate in the voting. Explaining their votes, France said the resolution was being used to bring pressure on other members of the council and was incapable of being implemented for one week; China said the current resolution would not meet the humanitarian needs of the Iraqi people; Malaysia stated that the one-week extension would serve no purpose other than placing pressure on the permanent members of the council; and Russia said the current resolution would not determine a timetable for a comprehensive resolution on Iraq and that it did not properly address the humanitarian crisis.

== See also ==
- Foreign relations of Iraq
- Gulf War
- Invasion of Kuwait
- Iraq sanctions
- List of United Nations Security Council Resolutions 1201 to 1300 (1998–2000)
