= United Nations Security Council Resolution 1175 =

UN Security Council Resolution 1175
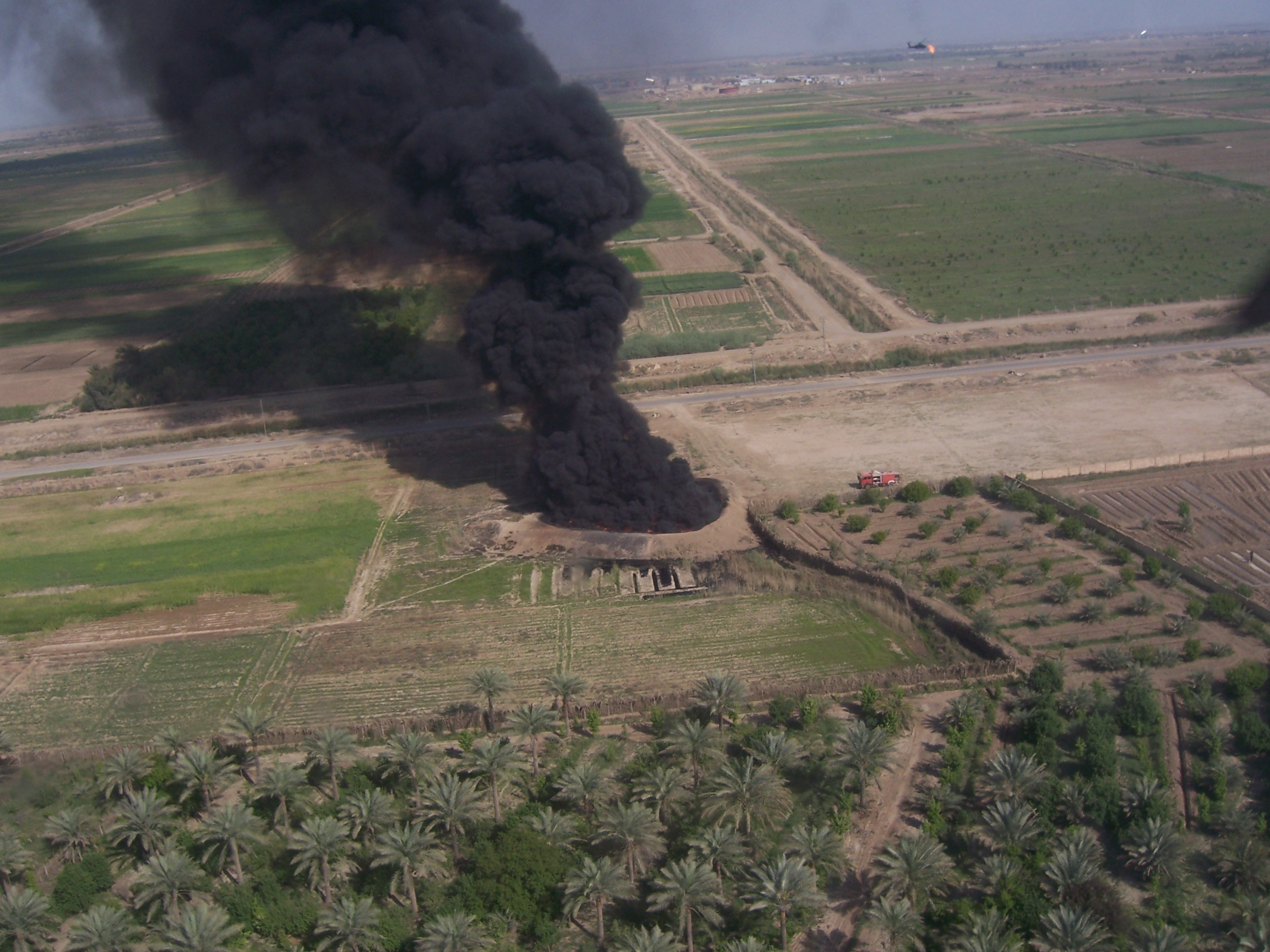
- A burning Iraqi oil well
- Date: 19 June 1998
- Meeting no.: 3,893
- Code: S/RES/1175 (Document)
- Subject: The situation between Iraq and Kuwait
- Voting summary: 15 voted for; None voted against; None abstained
- Result: Adopted

Security Council composition
- Permanent members: China; France; Russia; United Kingdom; United States
- Non-permanent members: Bahrain; Brazil; Costa Rica; Gabon; Gambia; Japan; Kenya; Portugal; Slovenia; Sweden

United Nations Security Council resolution 1175, adopted unanimously on 19 June 1998, after recalling all previous resolutions on Iraq, including resolutions 986 (1995), 1111 (1997), 1129 (1997), 1143 (1997), 1153 (1998) and 1158 (1998) concerning the Oil-for-Food Programme, the Council noted that Iraq was unable to export petroleum or petroleum products sufficient to produce US$5.256 billion worth of oil and authorised countries to provide Iraq with equipment to allow it to meet that sum.

The security council noted that the group of experts had found that Iraq was not capable of producing exports to the sum of US$5.256 billion authorised under Resolution 1153. It remained convinced of the need for a temporary programme to meet the humanitarian needs of the Iraqi people until the government of Iraq fulfilled previous Security Council resolutions, including Resolution 687 (1991) which allowed the council to take further action with regard to the provisions of Resolution 661 (1991).

Acting under Chapter VII of the United Nations Charter, the council authorised states to export necessary parts to Iraq to enable the country to increase oil exports. Funds in the escrow account up to a total of US$300 million were for the expenses determined by the committee established in Resolution 661 related to the export of such equipment. It was also decided that expenses directly related to oil exports could be financed by letters of credit drawn against future oil sales, which would be deposited in the escrow account.

The distribution plan approved by the Secretary-General Kofi Annan would remain in effect for each renewal of the Oil-for-Food Programme. He had made available a list of parts and equipment presented by the government of Iraq and was subsequently requested to monitor the usage of the parts in Iraq.

== See also ==
- Foreign relations of Iraq
- Gulf War
- Invasion of Kuwait
- Iraq sanctions
- List of United Nations Security Council Resolutions 1101 to 1200 (1997–1998)
