= United Nations Security Council Resolution 1275 =

UN Security Council Resolution 1275
- Iraq
- Date: 19 November 1999
- Meeting no.: 4,070
- Code: S/RES/1275 (Document)
- Subject: The situation between Iraq and Kuwait
- Voting summary: 15 voted for; None voted against; None abstained
- Result: Adopted

Security Council composition
- Permanent members: China; France; Russia; United Kingdom; United States
- Non-permanent members: Argentina; Bahrain; Brazil; Canada; Gabon; Gambia; Malaysia; Namibia; Netherlands; Slovenia

United Nations Security Council resolution 1275, adopted unanimously on 19 November 1999, after recalling resolutions 1242 (1999) and 1266 (1999) concerning the Oil-for-Food Programme, the council, acting under Chapter VII of the United Nations Charter, extended provisions relating to the export of Iraqi petroleum or petroleum products in return for humanitarian aid for two weeks until 4 December 1999.

The security council had previously raised the limit on the value of oil that Iraq was allowed to export under the Programme, and the increased limit would be valid until 4 December. Though several members of the Council supported the adoption of Resolution 1275 to ensure the uninterrupted continuation of the Programme, they expressed concern that the council was unable to reach a consensus on how to approach the Iraq situation. Disagreements amongst the Council continued to affect the adoption of further resolutions on the Oil-for-Food Programme.

== See also ==
- Foreign relations of Iraq
- Gulf War
- Invasion of Kuwait
- Iraq sanctions
- List of United Nations Security Council Resolutions 1201 to 1300 (1998–2000)
