= United Nations Security Council Resolution 1352 =

UN Security Council Resolution 1352
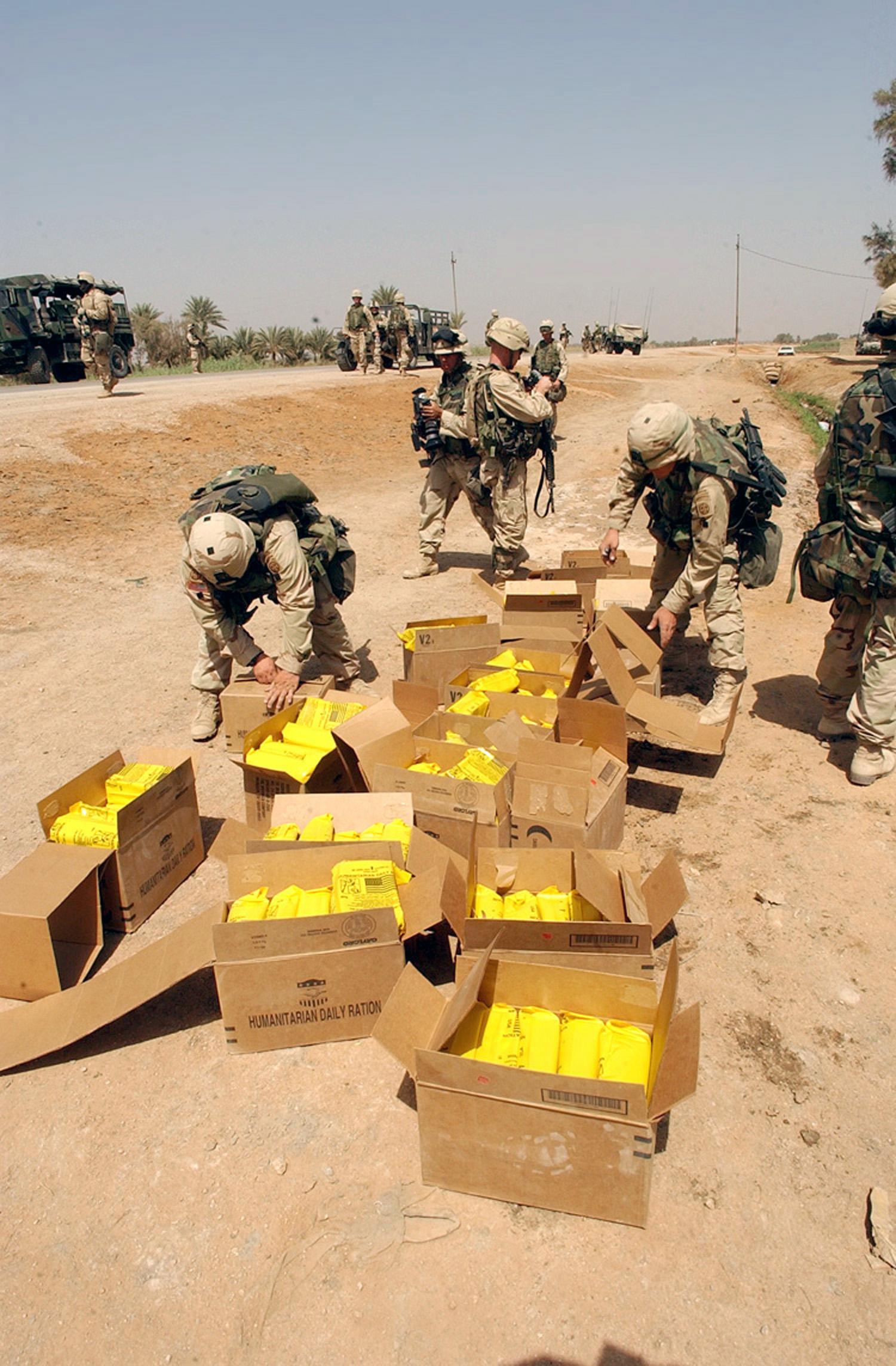
- Humanitarian aid distribution in Iraq
- Date: 1 June 2001
- Meeting no.: 4,324
- Code: S/RES/1352 (Document)
- Subject: The situation between Iraq and Kuwait
- Voting summary: 15 voted for; None voted against; None abstained
- Result: Adopted

Security Council composition
- Permanent members: China; France; Russia; United Kingdom; United States
- Non-permanent members: Bangladesh; Colombia; Ireland; Jamaica; Mali; Mauritius; Norway; Singapore; Tunisia; Ukraine

United Nations Security Council resolution 1352, adopted unanimously on 1 June 2001, after recalling all previous resolutions on Iraq, including resolutions 986 (1995), 1284 (1999) and 1330 (2000) concerning the Oil-for-Food Programme, the Council extended provisions relating to the export of Iraqi petroleum or petroleum products in return for humanitarian aid until 3 July 2001.

The Security Council was convinced of the need for a temporary measure to provide humanitarian assistance to the Iraqi people until the Iraqi government fulfilled the provisions of Resolution 687 (1991) and had distributed aid throughout the country equally. It also recalled the 1996 memorandum of understanding between the United Nations and the Iraqi government.

Acting under Chapter VII of the United Nations Charter, the council extended the Oil-for-Food Programme and expressed its intention to consider new arrangements to improve the flow of commodities and products to Iraq (other than banned items) and the facilitation of civilian trade and economic co-operation with Iraq. The proposed arrangements would also improve measures to prevent the sale or supply of items prohibited by the council and revenue flows outside the escrow account established by the council.

Finally, the resolution declared that the new provisions would be adopted for 190 days beginning 4 July 2001.

== See also ==
- Foreign relations of Iraq
- Gulf War
- Invasion of Kuwait
- Iraq sanctions
- List of United Nations Security Council Resolutions 1301 to 1400 (2000–2002)
