= United Nations Security Council Resolution 1153 =

UN Security Council Resolution 1153
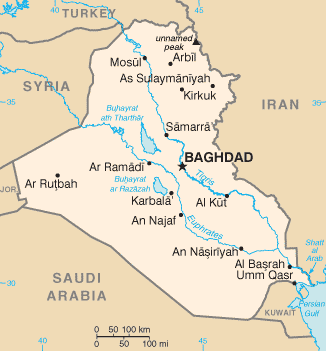
- Iraq
- Date: 20 February 1998
- Meeting no.: 3,855
- Code: S/RES/1153 (Document)
- Subject: The situation between Iraq and Kuwait
- Voting summary: 15 voted for; None voted against; None abstained
- Result: Adopted

Security Council composition
- Permanent members: China; France; Russia; United Kingdom; United States
- Non-permanent members: Bahrain; Brazil; Costa Rica; Gabon; Gambia; Japan; Kenya; Portugal; Slovenia; Sweden

United Nations Security Council resolution 1153, adopted unanimously on 20 February 1998, after recalling all previous resolutions on Iraq, including resolutions 986 (1995), 1111 (1997), 1129 (1997) and 1143 (1997) concerning the Oil-for-Food Programme, the council, acting under Chapter VII of the United Nations Charter, extended provisions relating to Iraqi oil sales for a further 180 days to meet the humanitarian needs of the Iraqi people and decided to permit the import of up to 5.256 billion United States dollars in Iraqi oil and oil products, up from the previous 2 billion.

The security council was convinced of the need of a temporary measure to provide humanitarian assistance to the Iraqi people until the fulfillment of Security Council resolutions by the Iraqi government, notably Resolution 661 (1991) and Resolution 687 (1991). It was convinced of the need for the equitable distribution of humanitarian supplies throughout the country, and was determined to avoid the further deterioration of the humanitarian situation, particularly as Iraq had not co-operated with the secretary-general.

Acting under Chapter VII, the council decided that the mechanism whereby Iraqi oil exports would finance humanitarian aid would continue for a further 180 days. It then increased the amount of oil that Iraq could export from 2 billion to 5.256 billion United States dollars in order to provide humanitarian aid. It also decided to conduct a thorough review of all aspects of the implementation of the present resolution after 90 days and before the end of the 180-day period, expressing its intention to consider a further extension based on the reports of the Secretary-General Kofi Annan and of the sanctions Committee. The reports would determine whether there were sufficient resources to meet humanitarian needs, possible improvements to Iraq's infrastructure and whether Iraq was producing enough oil to the sum of 5.256 billion United States dollars.

== See also ==
- Foreign relations of Iraq
- Iraq sanctions
- List of United Nations Security Council Resolutions 1101 to 1200 (1997–1998)
