= United Nations Security Council Resolution 1143 =

UN Security Council Resolution 1143
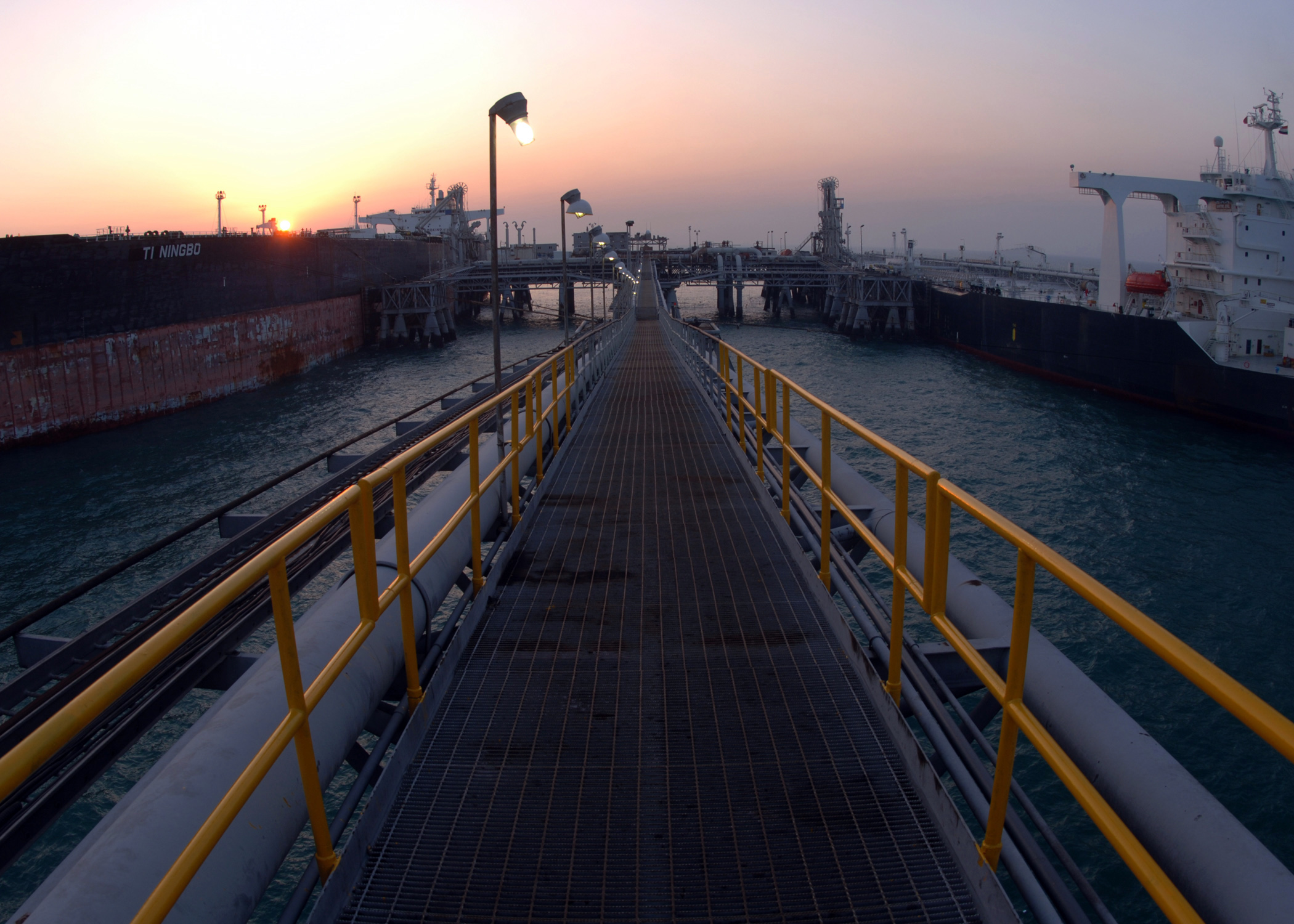
- Sunrise over the Al Basrah Oil Terminal in southern Iraq
- Date: 4 December 1997
- Meeting no.: 3,840
- Code: S/RES/1143 (Document)
- Subject: The situation between Iraq and Kuwait
- Voting summary: 15 voted for; None voted against; None abstained
- Result: Adopted

Security Council composition
- Permanent members: China; France; Russia; United Kingdom; United States
- Non-permanent members: Chile; Costa Rica; Egypt; Guinea-Bissau; Japan; Kenya; South Korea; Poland; Portugal; Sweden

United Nations Security Council resolution 1143, adopted unanimously on 4 December 1997, after recalling all previous resolutions on Iraq, including resolutions 986 (1995), 1111 (1997) and 1129 (1997) concerning the Oil-for-Food Programme, the council, acting under Chapter VII of the United Nations Charter, extended provisions relating to Iraqi oil sales for a further 180 days to meet the humanitarian needs of the Iraqi people.

The security council was convinced of the need of a temporary measure to provide humanitarian assistance to the Iraqi people until the fulfillment of Security Council resolutions by the Iraqi government, notably Resolution 687 (1991). It was determined to avoid the further deterioration of the humanitarian situation in Iraq and welcomed the intention of the Secretary-General Kofi Annan to consider ways of best meeting the humanitarian needs of the Iraqi people.

Acting under Chapter VII, the Council decided that the mechanism whereby Iraqi oil exports would finance humanitarian aid would continue for a further 180 days, beginning at 00:01 EST on 5 December 1997. It was further decided that a review would be conducted 90 days after the adoption of the current resolution, concerning its implementation, including the possibility of further extensions.

The Secretary-General Kofi Annan was requested to report 90 days and before 180 days after the adoption of the current resolution, on the basis of observation by United Nations personnel in Iraq on whether the Iraqi government had distributed medicine, health supplies, foodstuffs, and materials and supplies for essential civilian needs. Meanwhile, the committee established in Resolution 661 (1991) was requested to report to the council at the same intervals as Kofi Annan regarding the implementation of the provisions of Resolution 986. Finally, the secretary-general was further directed to submit a supplementary report concerning ways to improve the humanitarian programme by 30 January 1998.

== See also ==
- Foreign relations of Iraq
- Gulf War
- Invasion of Kuwait
- List of United Nations Security Council Resolutions 1101 to 1200 (1997–1998)
