= United Nations Security Council Resolution 1129 =

UN Security Council Resolution 1129
- Date: 12 September 1997
- Meeting no.: 3,817
- Code: S/RES/1129 (Document)
- Subject: The situation between Iraq and Kuwait
- Voting summary: 14 voted for; None voted against; 1 abstained
- Result: Adopted

Security Council composition
- Permanent members: China; France; Russia; United Kingdom; United States
- Non-permanent members: Chile; Costa Rica; Egypt; Guinea-Bissau; Japan; Kenya; South Korea; Poland; Portugal; Sweden

United Nations Security Council resolution 1129, adopted on 12 September 1997, after recalling all previous resolutions on Iraq, including resolutions 986 (1995) and 1111 (1997) concerning the Oil-for-Food Programme, the Council decided that the provisions of Resolution 1111 would remain in force, but permitted special provisions to allow Iraq to sell petroleum in a more favourable time frame.

On 8 June 1997, the security council extended the Oil-for-Food Programme in Iraq for an additional 180 days. It noted the Iraqi government's decision not to export petroleum or petroleum products from 8 June and 13 August 1997, and was therefore concerned at the resulting humanitarian effects on the Iraqi people due to a shortfall in revenue from oil sales. The council was determined to avoid any further deterioration in the humanitarian situation.

Acting under Chapter VII of the United Nations Charter, countries were authorised to import oil and oil products from Iraq for 120 days from 8 June, not exceeding a total of one billion United States dollars. From 4 October 1997, there would be a period of 60 days in which further imports were authorised, not exceeding one billion United States dollars.

The Secretary-General Kofi Annan's intention to follow up observations regarding the needs of vulnerable groups in Iraq and the Iraqi government's response to them was welcomed. Appropriate amendments to the plan had to be requested prior to purchasing items not on the list.

Russia abstained from the vote on Resolution 1129, which was approved by the other 14 members of the council, stating that the text was approved hastily and not all opinions were reflected in the resolution.

== See also ==
- Foreign relations of Iraq
- Gulf War
- Invasion of Kuwait
- List of United Nations Security Council Resolutions 1101 to 1200 (1997–1998)
