= Humanitarian assistance =

Aid to save lives during and after disasters

Humanitarian assistance is aid and action designed to save lives, alleviate suffering, and maintain human dignity during and after man-made crises and disasters. It encompasses a wide range of activities, including providing food, water, shelter, medical care, and protection. Humanitarian assistance is grounded in the principles of humanity, impartiality, neutrality, and independence.

While often used interchangeably, humanitarian aid and humanitarian assistance are distinct concepts. Humanitarian aid generally refers to the provision of immediate, short-term relief in crisis situations, such as food, water, shelter, and medical care. Humanitarian assistance, on the other hand, encompasses a broader range of activities, including longer-term support for recovery, rehabilitation, and capacity building. Humanitarian assistance is designed to complement and support States in fulfilling their responsibilities to assist and protect populations in need, rather than to undermine or replace those responsibilities.

== Fundamental principles ==
Humanitarian assistance is guided by a set of core principles that are essential to maintaining the integrity and effectiveness of humanitarian action. These principles, which have been affirmed by the United Nations General Assembly and are widely accepted by humanitarian organizations worldwide, include humanity, impartiality, neutrality, independence, voluntary service, unity, and universality.

- Humanity: The principle of humanity stipulates that human suffering must be addressed wherever it is found, with particular attention to the most vulnerable populations. The dignity and rights of all those in need must be respected and protected.
- Impartiality: Impartiality requires that humanitarian assistance be provided solely on the basis of need, without discrimination based on nationality, race, gender, religious belief, class, or political opinion.
- Neutrality: Neutrality means that humanitarian actors must not take sides in hostilities or engage in controversies of a political, racial, religious, or ideological nature. This principle can be controversial, as it may require humanitarian actors to engage with all parties to a conflict, including those who may have committed abuses.
- Independence: Independence means that humanitarian action must be autonomous from political, economic, military, or other objectives. Humanitarian actors must be able to act in accordance with humanitarian principles without interference.
- Voluntary Service: Voluntary service reflects the idea that humanitarian assistance is provided without a desire for gain. It is a humanitarian act provided by organizations and individuals motivated by a desire to help those in need.

While these principles are widely accepted, their application in practice can sometimes be challenging, particularly in complex political and security environments. Maintaining a principled approach while also ensuring access to populations in need can involve difficult trade-offs and requires careful navigation by humanitarian actors.

== Key UN entities ==
Several United Nations entities play crucial roles in delivering humanitarian assistance worldwide. These organizations work together to provide a coordinated, effective, and principled response to humanitarian crises.

- UN Office for the Coordination of Humanitarian Affairs (OCHA): OCHA is responsible for bringing together humanitarian actors to ensure a coherent response to emergencies. It works to overcome obstacles that impede humanitarian assistance from reaching people affected by crises and provides leadership in mobilizing assistance and resources.
- UN Development Programme (UNDP): While not primarily a humanitarian agency, UNDP plays a key role in crisis response and recovery. It works to support countries in rebuilding after disasters and conflicts, focusing on long-term development and resilience.
- United Nations High Commissioner for Refugees (UNHCR): UNHCR is mandated to lead and coordinate international action to protect refugees and resolve refugee problems worldwide. It strives to ensure that everyone can exercise the right to seek asylum and find safe refuge in another state, with the option to return home voluntarily, integrate locally, or resettle in a third country.
- United Nations Children's Fund (UNICEF): UNICEF works in over 190 countries to save children's lives, defend their rights, and help them fulfill their potential. In humanitarian crises, UNICEF provides emergency relief focused on water and sanitation, nutrition, education, and child protection.
- UN Population Fund (UNFPA): UNFPA is the lead UN agency focused on reproductive health, gender equality, and population dynamics. In humanitarian settings, UNFPA works to provide sexual and reproductive health services, prevent and respond to gender-based violence, and address the needs of vulnerable populations such as pregnant women and adolescent girls.
- World Food Programme (WFP): WFP is the world's largest humanitarian organization, providing food assistance to millions of people in emergencies and working with communities to improve nutrition and build resilience. In addition to delivering food aid, WFP also provides logistics support to the broader humanitarian community.
- Food and Agriculture Organization (FAO): FAO's work in emergencies focuses on helping vulnerable communities and households to be better prepared for and able to respond to crises. This includes providing agricultural inputs, livestock support, and cash transfers to help restore food production and livelihoods.
- World Health Organization (WHO): WHO is responsible for providing leadership on global health matters, setting norms and standards, providing technical support to countries, and monitoring health trends. In humanitarian crises, WHO works to provide essential health services, prevent disease outbreaks, and strengthen health systems.

These UN entities work closely together and with other humanitarian actors to deliver assistance in a coordinated and effective manner. While each has its specific mandate and area of expertise, they share a common commitment to humanitarian principles and to providing timely, life-saving assistance to those in need.

== International NGOs ==
International non-governmental organizations (NGOs) are crucial actors in providing humanitarian assistance to regions affected by crises such as conflicts, natural disasters, and other emergencies. These organizations can be broadly categorized into three main types:

=== Health-Focused NGOs ===
- Médecins Sans Frontières (MSF) or Doctors Without Borders : A Nobel Peace Prize-winning organization that provides emergency medical assistance and healthcare services in conflict zones, areas affected by epidemics, natural disasters, and other crises.
- Médecins du Monde (MDM) or Doctors of the World : A French international humanitarian organization that provides emergency medical aid, healthcare services, and advocacy for vulnerable populations in crisis situations.

=== Global NGOs ===
- Oxfam: A confederation of independent charitable organizations focusing on alleviating global poverty, providing emergency aid, and advocating for policy changes to address the root causes of poverty and injustice.
- Save the Children : A leading NGO dedicated to promoting children's rights, providing relief and support services for children in emergencies, and ensuring their access to education, healthcare, and protection.
- CARE International : A global organization that works in over 100 countries, addressing poverty, emergencies, and social injustice by empowering women and girls and promoting sustainable development.
- Action Contre la Faim (ACF, also known as Action Against Hunger): A global organization that works in over 50 countries, addressing food security, nutrition, resilience, livelihoods development, and health and WASH in the most fragile contexts.

=== Single-Country Origin NGOs ===
- Norwegian Refugee Council (NRC) : A Norwegian humanitarian organization that provides assistance to refugees and internally displaced persons, focusing on emergency aid, education, and legal assistance.
- Concern Worldwide: An Irish humanitarian organization that works in over 25 countries, focusing on emergency response, poverty alleviation, and sustainable development.
- ACTED (Agency for Technical Cooperation and Development): A French humanitarian NGO that provides emergency relief and long-term development assistance in crisis-affected regions, with a focus on economic empowerment and sustainable solutions.

These NGOs collaborate with local communities, governments, and other organizations to deliver essential services, advocate for the rights of vulnerable populations, and promote sustainable development in challenging and often dangerous environments. Their efforts are crucial in alleviating the suffering of people affected by crises worldwide.

== National NGOs and civil society organizations ==
In addition to large international NGOs, there are numerous national and local non-governmental organizations and civil society groups that play vital roles in delivering humanitarian assistance and promoting development initiatives within their respective countries.

National NGOs operate solely within the boundaries of a single country, typically focusing on addressing specific issues or catering to the needs of local communities. They often have a deep understanding of the local context, culture, and socio-economic dynamics, allowing them to design and implement more targeted and relevant programs. Examples include the Bangladesh Rural Advancement Committee (BRAC) and the Self Employed Women's Association (SEWA) in India.

Civil Society Organizations (CSOs) encompass a broader range of non-profit entities like community-based organizations, advocacy groups, trade unions, and social movements. CSOs play a crucial role in representing societal interests, promoting civic engagement, and advocating for policy changes and social justice. Examples include Amnesty International, Greenpeace, and the World Wildlife Fund (WWF).

Differences from International NGOs:

1. Funding Streams: International NGOs often receive significant funding from major donors such as governments, multilateral organizations, and international foundations. In contrast, national NGOs and CSOs typically rely more heavily on local funding sources like individual donations, community contributions, and small grants.
2. Scope and Reach: International NGOs tend to have a global reach, operating across multiple countries and regions, while national NGOs and CSOs primarily focus within their respective countries or local communities, although some may collaborate internationally on specific projects.
3. Governance and Accountability: International NGOs are typically governed by international boards and accountable to a global network of stakeholders, whereas national NGOs and CSOs are often governed locally and primarily accountable to domestic stakeholders.
4. Advocacy and Policy Influence: While both engage in advocacy, national NGOs and CSOs often have a stronger voice and influence in shaping national policies and advocating for local issues due to their deep understanding of local contexts.

Despite these differences, national NGOs and CSOs frequently collaborate with international NGOs and global partners to leverage resources, expertise, and networks in addressing humanitarian and development challenges within their countries.

== The Red Cross and Red Crescent Movement ==
The Red Cross and Red Crescent Movement is a leading humanitarian force guided by its Fundamental Principles of humanity, impartiality, neutrality, independence, voluntary service, unity, and universality. It consists of three main components:

=== 1. International Committee of the Red Cross (ICRC) ===
- The ICRC is an impartial, neutral, and independent organization ensuring humanitarian protection and assistance for victims of war and armed violence.
- Its mandate stems from the Geneva Conventions of 1949
- The ICRC monitors compliance with international humanitarian law, visits prisoners of war and civilian detainees, assists the wounded, restores family links, and supports national Red Cross and Red Crescent societies.

=== 2. International Federation of Red Cross and Red Crescent Societies (IFRC) ===
- The IFRC is the world's largest humanitarian network, comprising 192 National Red Cross and Red Crescent Societies.
- It acts before, during and after disasters and health emergencies to meet the needs and improve the lives of vulnerable people.
- The IFRC coordinates and directs international assistance from its member National Societies to where it is needed most.

=== 3. National Red Cross and Red Crescent Societies ===
- National Societies act as auxiliaries to the public authorities in their own countries in the humanitarian field.
- Their work includes disaster relief, health and social programs, and the dissemination of international humanitarian law.
- Many National Societies have Disaster Response Teams that can be deployed abroad to support other societies during crises.

While the ICRC works specifically in conflict zones, the IFRC and National Societies focus more broadly on responding to emergencies and promoting humanitarian values worldwide.

=== Missions to other countries ===
National Red Cross and Red Crescent Societies can be called upon to aid other National Societies during emergencies or longer-term developmental programs. This can involve:

- Deploying relief workers, medical personnel, logistics experts etc.
- Providing material assistance like relief supplies, ambulances, transitional shelters etc.
- Offering training, capacity building and knowledge-sharing support.

Such missions abroad operate under the principles of the Movement and the leadership of the host National Society. They aim to support local efforts and build resilience within affected communities.

Whether working domestically or internationally, the Movement's components are united by their commitment to preventing and alleviating human suffering.
