= United Nations Security Council Resolution 986 =

UN Security Council Resolution 986
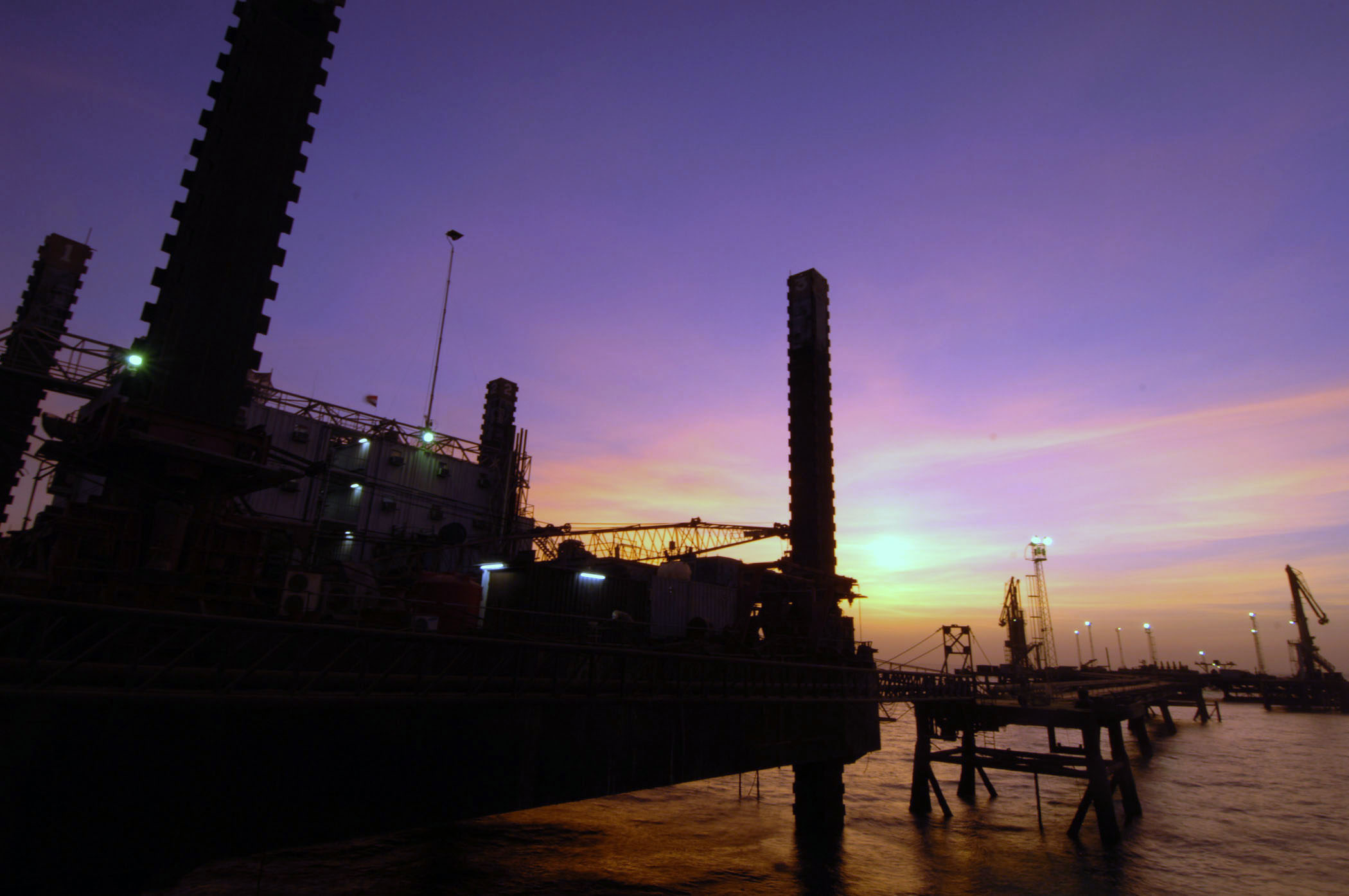
- Al Basrah Oil Terminal
- Date: 14 April 1995
- Meeting no.: 3,519
- Code: S/RES/986 (Document)
- Subject: Iraq
- Voting summary: 15 voted for; None voted against; None abstained
- Result: Adopted

Security Council composition
- Permanent members: China; France; Russia; United Kingdom; United States
- Non-permanent members: Argentina; Botswana; Czech Republic; Germany; Honduras; Indonesia; Italy; Nigeria; Oman; Rwanda

United Nations Security Council resolution 986, adopted unanimously on 14 April 1995, after reaffirming all resolutions on Iraq and noting the serious humanitarian situation with the Iraqi civilian population, the council, acting under Chapter VII of the United Nations Charter, established a mechanism whereby Iraqi oil exports would finance humanitarian aid to the country, which later became known as the Oil-for-Food Programme.

The security council was convinced of the need as a temporary measure to provide humanitarian assistance to the Iraqi people until the country complied with all relevant Security Council resolutions, including Resolution 687 (1991) which allowed for further measures to be taken concerning sanctions imposed in Resolution 661 (1991).

== Provisions ==
Firstly, countries were authorised to permit the import of petroleum, petroleum products and related financial transactions originating in Iraq for a total sum of up to US$1 billion every 90 days, subject to the approval of the committee established in Resolution 661 and that payments made for oil would be made into the escrow account created by the current resolution. Turkey was permitted to charge fees for using the Kirkuk-Yumurtalik pipeline in its territory. The aforementioned would come into force at 00:01 EST the day after the President of the Security Council announced that he had received a report by the Secretary-General Boutros Boutros-Ghali, with the provisions remaining in force for an initial period of 180 days. A review would be conducted halfway through this period.

The following provisions would come into immediate effect. Independent inspectors and the committee would inspect oil sales and an escrow account would be established. The account would:

(a) finance the export of medicine, health supplies, foodstuffs, and materials and supplies for essential civilian needs, which the Government of Iraq should agree to their equitable distribution;
(b) complement the distribution of humanitarian goods by the Iraqi government;
(c) transfer the same percentage of the funds deposited in the escrow account to the United Nations Compensation Commission decided by Resolution 705 (1991);
(d) finance the independent inspectors and certified public accountants and other activities;
(e) meet the operational costs of the United Nations Special Commission;
(f) meet other expenses and costs;
(g) make available up to US$10 million every 90 days for payments envisaged in Resolution 778 (1992).

Countries were authorised, notwithstanding the provisions of Resolution 661, to export parts and equipment which are essential for the safe operation of the Kirkuk-Yumurtalik pipeline in Iraq and activities associated with it. The costs may be paid by credit pending payment into the escrow account.

The secretary-general was requested to report at 90 days and 180 days during the process, while the committee was required to develop procedures necessary to implement the above provisions. Both were urged to take effective action to ensure the implementation of the resolution. The Council provided immunity for the petroleum and petroleum products, the escrow account and all personnel working with the United Nations in accordance with the Convention on the Privileges and Immunities of the United Nations.

The resolution concluded by reaffirming that none of its provisions should affect Iraq's obligations concerning the repayment of foreign debt, and at the same time should not infringe on its sovereignty and territorial integrity.

== Aftermath ==
Iraq initially rejected the resolution on the grounds that it violated its sovereignty, and did not accept its provisions until January 1996. The programme was formally terminated on 21 November 2003 following the 2003 invasion of Iraq, and its major functions turned over to the Coalition Provisional Authority.

== See also ==
- Foreign relations of Iraq
- Gulf War
- Invasion of Kuwait
- List of United Nations Security Council Resolutions 901 to 1000 (1994–1995)
- United Nations Security Council Resolution 706
