= International response to the Rwandan genocide =

The response of the international community to the 1994 Genocide against Tutsi in Rwanda has been the subject of significant criticism. During a period of around 100 days, between 7 April and 15 July, an estimated 1,100,000 Rwandans, mostly Tutsi and moderate Hutu, were murdered by Interahamwe militias.

A United Nations peacekeeping force – UNAMIR – had been stationed in Rwanda since October 1993, but once the genocide began, the UN and the Belgian Government chose to withdraw troops instead of reinforcing the contingent and deploying a larger force. The piecemeal peacekeeping force on the ground was both unable and unauthorised to make any attempt at stopping the violence, and their role was reduced to seeking a political agreement between the Rwandan Patriotic Front and the Interim Hutu Power government, as well as protecting selected havens for Tutsi who were seeking refuge, such as Amahoro Stadium and the Hôtel des Mille Collines. Critics blame the inaction of the UN in the face of genocide as responsible for much of the damage.

== Background ==
Particularly since the era of Belgian colonialism, where previously fluid ethnic identities were crystallised through administrative selection and the institution of identity cards, divisions between the Hutu majority and the Tutsi minority had been the source of frequently violent political tensions. Shortly before independence, the Tutsi ruling class instituted by the Belgians was overthrown by the Hutu revolution in 1959. Over the following decades, multiple instances of ethnically-motivated pogroms and massacres took place, and as a result many Tutsi – over 300,000 – fled Rwanda to neighbouring countries.

In 1990, a group of 4,000 Rwandan exiles, the Rwandan Patriotic Front, advanced into Rwanda from Uganda, commencing the Rwandan Civil War. A peace agreement, the Arusha Accords, was signed in 1993, bringing most of the fighting to an end. The RPF were given positions in a Broad-Based Transitional Government (BBTG) and in the national army. To monitor the peace agreement, the United Nations Assistance Mission for Rwanda (UNAMIR), a peacekeeping force, arrived in the country and the RPF were given a base in the national parliament building in Kigali, for use during the setting up of the BBTG.

On 6 April 1994, President Juvénal Habyarimana’s plane was shot down over Kigali, killing him, as well as the President of Burundi, Cyprien Ntaryamira. The event served as a catalyst for mass killings of Tutsi and moderate Hutu by the Interahamwe – militias supported by politicians and other key figures who were part of the Hutu Power movement.

The movement recruited and pressured Hutu civilians to arm themselves with machetes, clubs, blunt objects, and other weapons and encouraged them to rape, maim, and kill their Tutsi neighbors and to destroy or steal their property. The RPF restarted its offensive soon after Habyarimana's assassination. It rapidly seized control of the northern part of the country and captured Kigali about 100 days later in mid-July, bringing an end to the genocide. The overall death toll of the Genocide is disputed, but most scholars estimate between 500,000 and 800,000 Tutsi deaths, and up to 1.1 million overall deaths.

== Early warnings ==
Several warnings made to UN peacekeepers and international observers went unheeded. As Rwanda expert Alison Des Forges put it, in her report for Human Rights Watch, "the preparations for violence took place in full view of a U.N. peacekeeping force".

On 11 January 1994, General Roméo Dallaire, commander of UNAMIR, sent his "Genocide Fax" to UN Headquarters. The fax stated that Dallaire was in contact with "a top level trainer in the cadre of Interhamwe-armed [sic] militia of MRND." The informant—now known to be Mathieu Ngirumpatse's chauffeur, Kassim Turatsinze, a.k.a. "Jean-Pierre"—claimed to have been ordered to register all Tutsi in Kigali. According to the memo, Turatsinze suspected that a genocide against the Tutsis was being planned, and he said that "in 20 minutes his personnel could kill up to 1000 Tutsis".

Following this, Dallaire sent further warnings, and pleas for action from the Security Council, five times: January 22, February 3, February 15, February 27 and March 13. Dallaire's reports were widely ignored by key officials, and his requests for a broader interpretation of the mandate and for troop reinforcements were all rejected. His request to raid weapons caches, the locations of which had been revealed by his informant, was turned down by the UN Department of Peacekeeping Operations (DPKO), which felt that Dallaire was exceeding his mandate and had to be kept "on a leash".

Officials from within the UN Secretariat have testified that there was a concerted effort to minimise reports of imminent tragedy in Rwanda by the office of Secretary General Boutros Boutros-Ghali. Michael Barnett, who was a senior official at the UN at that time, has provided evidence that the UN Department of Peacekeeping Operations (DPKO) failed to pass on to the Security Council information that could have bolstered a case for intervention. The January 11 fax, for instance, "was not delivered to the council members nor were its contents communicated" according to researchers at Human Rights Watch. According to Barnett, UN inaction stemmed from its desire not to get involved in a potentially-risky operation for public relations that could damage the prospects for future peace-building operations since 18 UN troops had recently been killed in Somalia, despite the capacity of UN troops to save thousands of lives. "For many at the UN", Barnett wrote, the moral compass pointed "away from and not toward Rwanda."

Instead, the international community resorted to focusing on democratic channels to prevent a crisis from unfolding in Rwanda, and devoted its efforts to the implementation of the Arusha Accords and the creation and maintenance of a transitional government. Only Belgium took an active interest in expanding the mandate of UNAMIR - thanks in large part to their concerns over their large contingent of troops stationed as part of the mission. Even they, Des Forges writes, "failed to invest the energy needed to make the other powers respond". Throughout diplomatic exchanges in this period, French diplomats were supportive of the Rwandan regime, and continued to provide military support to their army, even while they were certainly aware of the preparations for massacres.

== International response ==
After first failing to heed the warnings of organised mass killings, there is an overwhelming consensus that the international community then failed to recognise that genocide was occurring, delayed and equivocated over the use of the term "genocide", and finally, once the fact that genocide was occurring was beyond any doubt, failed to take any meaningful action to stop the killings.

=== United Nations ===
Since the deployment of UNAMIR, the UN Secretariat, the DPKO, and the Security Council had strictly limited the mandate of the peacekeepers and ensured that it was interpreted as narrowly as possible, in order to avoid any confrontations between peacekeepers and Rwandans. The shooting down of the Presidential plane and the explosion of violence that followed it did not change this approach - hours after the plane went down, General Dallaire pled with DPKO in New York, imploring them to "Give me the means and I can do more" - to which he was told "nobody in New York was interested".

Among the first people killed in the Genocide, early on the morning of 7 April, were ten Belgian members of the 2nd Commando Battalion, the Paracommando Regiment operating as part of UNAMIR and protecting then-Prime Minister Agathe Uwilingiyimana. These troops were murdered after handing over their weapons to Rwandan government troops. They were advised to do so by their battalion commander who was unclear on the legal issues with authorising them to defend themselves, even though they had already been under fire for approximately two hours.

UN Peacekeepers felt mostly paralyzed by directives from New York. Neutrality was emphasised, with the risk of military retaliation - particularly after the Somalia experience - at the forefront of the minds of diplomats and UN staff alike. Some soldiers "believed that there were virtually no circumstances in which they could legitimately fire their weapons". The Guardian stated that viewing a woman "being hauled along the road by a young man with a machete",

...none of the troops moved. 'It's not our mandate,' said one, leaning against his jeep as he watched the condemned woman, the driving rain splashing at his blue United Nations badge. The 3,000 foreign troops now in Rwanda are no more than spectators to the savagery which aid workers say has seen the massacre of 15,000 people.

The scale of the massacres was quickly evident to troops on the ground. "Within five days" of the downing of Habyarimana's plane, "Dallaire clearly understood that Hutu extremists were carrying out ethnic cleansing in Kigali and elsewhere" wrote Michael Barnett. Dallaire lobbied for an immediate expansion of UNAMIR to halt these killings, requesting 5,000 troops, and the clarification of the mandate to enable peacekeepers to take action to stop the killings of civilians.

Yet there was no appetite in New York, or in any major capitals, for such an intervention. A key turning point came on 12 April, when the Belgian government, one of the largest troop contributors to UNAMIR announced that it was withdrawing its troops. Belgium had previously supported Dallaire's calls for reinforcements. Having initially argued for reinforcements, upon realising the fruitlessness of these requests, Belgium favoured a complete withdrawal of UNAMIR, and lobbied for this in the UN. Dallaire protested, arguing that the force should be strengthened and given a new mandate to protect the thousands of refugees it was protecting, but the UN Security Council refused, telling Dallaire that UNAMIR would be effectively withdrawn unless the belligerents agreed to a ceasefire by early May. According to Philip Gourevitch, the United States, having recently suffered losses in the UN mission in Somalia, was particularly keen to "get out of Rwanda" and "leave it to its fate". Outside of the permanent members, New Zealand, which held the rotating presidency of the UN Security Council, was the lone voice supporting reinforcement, and in late April, persuaded the council to postpone UNAMIR's withdrawal, despite continuing reluctance from the United States and United Kingdom.

On 21 April, the Security Council voted to cut UNAMIR's troop contingent from 2,500 to a nominal 250 troops - with the principal aim of facilitating negotiations between the interim government and the RPF.

==== UNAMIR II ====
For the next six weeks, approximately, UNAMIR coordinated peace talks between the Hutu government and the RPF to little avail. Eventually, on 17 May 1994, the UN agreed to reinforcement, that would deliver nearly 5,500 troops and much needed personnel carriers and other equipment to former UNAMIR, now known as UNAMIR II. The new soldiers did not start arriving until June, and following the end of the genocide in July, the role of UNAMIR II was largely confined to maintaining security and stability. UNAMIR withdrew from Rwanda in 1996, following the withdrawal of support by the RPF-led government.

UNAMIR II and subsequent resolutions were still unclear on the right to use force in stopping the genocide. In one of Dallaire's parting cables, he said that "the [UN] force has been prevented from having a modicum of self-respect and effectiveness on the ground". Unfortunately, in the face of the mayhem in Rwanda and this diplomatic watering down of UNAMIR's mandate, many UN member states delayed contributing personnel for some time, until the main wave of killings ceased.

=== Belgium ===
Belgium was a colonial power in Rwanda and had a deep political connection with the government even after decolonization. Belgium was one of the first contributors to the United Nations Assistance Mission for Rwanda (UNAMIR), along with Bangladesh, contributing around 400 troops.

After the assassination of President Habyarimana on 6 April 1994, the Radio des Milles Collines spread a rumour that Belgian soldiers from UNAMIR had caused the attack - mobilizing the widespread resentment for Belgium amongst Rwandans, on account of the colonial past. The murder of ten Belgian peacekeepers on April 7 prompted the Belgian government to decide that UNAMIR needed to be strengthened, and the mandate extended, or else they could not justify the continuing participation of their troops as part of the operation. Foreign Minister Willy Claes warned of the possibility of "widespread massacres", and argued that "if there should be many deaths, public opinion would not understand if UNAMIR remained passive, hiding behind the limitation of its mandate."

Upon realising that other Security Council members would not even consider the militarisation of UNAMIR, the Belgians quickly decided to focus on evacuating the 1,520 Belgians who were resident in Rwanda, and to move towards the withdrawal of their troops. On 12 April, they made it clear to the Secretary-General that Belgian troops would be leaving Rwanda, and informed the Security Council on 13 April.

As part of the mission to evacuate foreign nationals, Belgian UNAMIR troops were ordered to abandon their stations. One such group of soldiers were ordered to leave their post at the École Technique Officielle, where they were sheltering 2,000 Rwandans. Hutu militants entered and massacred everyone inside.

=== Canada ===
In July 1993, UNAMIR Force Commander General Roméo Dallaire received little information on the background of the conflict in Rwanda. Upon requesting current intelligence, he was denied and given little access to the information. Forced to proceed on his mission blindly because of the lack of information Canada was given, the mission was planned poorly, especially as they were provided with inexperienced experts in economic, political, and human rights operational planning. That came as a result of military operations having ignored requirements for long-term solutions to the causes of the Rwandan conflict. Their mandate allowed them only to monitor the implementation of the Arusha Accords and to support the transitional government. The mission was also restricted with little funding or time, and force was prohibited from using except in self-defence.

After the 1994 shooting down of President Habyarimana's plane, Dallaire called for reinforcement and was denied. By April 10, it was clear the non-battle pole strategy had failed to prevent the genocide. Belgium withdrew its forces after a number of their soldiers were massacred, and most of the UN force followed shortly afterwards. UNAMIR eventually took under protection 40,000 Rwandans despite its strict mandate. The Peacemaking (Chapter VII) UNAMIR II deployed once the airport had been retaken and forces could begin to arrive (UN ARCH). Canadian (Operation Lance), British (Operation Gabriel), and Australian (Operation Tamor) forces were among the first western nations to arrive and join the small UN force and begin assisting Rwandan in achieving peace and healing, including intervening in the genocide.

Canada’s new role in genocide prevention was to take action under the UN Charter as it considered appropriate in an attempt to prevent and suppress the violent acts of genocide. With the use of a bipolar strategy, military defense prevention and suppression, Canadian policy makers could respond when it may be the only practical way of stopping genocides.

=== France ===
From October 1990 to December 1993, the French Army led Opération Noroit. France openly supported the regime of Juvénal Habyarimana against the Rwandese Patriotic Front rebels and contributed a "French presence to the limit of direct engagement", according to the title of a chapter of the report of the French parliamentary mission. The operation allowed the French to organize and train Rwandan troops, who subsequently formed the Interahamwe militias or even future militiamen.

France, in agreement with the international community, endorsed the peace process of the negotiations of the Arusha Accords between the Rwandan government, the opposition and the exiles of the Rwandan Patriotic Front.

In December 1993, France used the arrival of the UNAMIR, which had come to the implementation of the Arusha Accords, as a front, according to diverse sources, while some military technicians continued to operate in Rwanda. A couple of Frenchmen were notably assassinated, reportedly by the RPF, in the hours that followed the attack and were engaged in setting up sophisticated electronic equipment.

On 8 April 1994, two days after the attack against Habyarimana, France launched Opération Amaryllis to permit the secured evacuation of 1500 residents, mainly Westerners. The Rwandan survivors have strongly criticised the operation; according to numerous witnesses, it did not include the evacuation of the Rwandans threatened with the massacres even when they were employed by the French authorities. France also evacuated dignitaries from the Habyarimana regime, and on 11 April, 97 children from the orphanage protected by Madame Habyarimana were evacuated. According to several sources, several dignitaries close to the Habyarimana family were also evacuated. Operation Amaryllis terminated on 14 April.

UNAMIR's Kigali sector commander, Belgian Col. Luc Marchal, reported to the BBC that one of the French planes that was supposedly participating in the evacuation operation arrived at 0345 on 9 April with several boxes of ammunition. The boxes were unloaded and transported by FAR vehicles to the Kanombe camp, where the Rwandese presidential guard was quartered. The French government has categorically denied the shipment by saying that the planes carried only French military personnel and material for the evacuation.

France was very active at the UN in the discussions about the reinforcement of the UNAMIR in May 1994. Despite the inertia of the international community, France obtained the backing of the UN to lead Opération Turquoise from June 22 to August 22, 1994. Its declared goal was to protect the "populations threatened" by the genocide or the military conflict between the FPR and the temporary Rwandan government. No hierarchy between both types of threatened people was established. Both parties of the military conflict assimilated them, and the system was organised to remain neutral between the two different groups. The system was humanitarian in some cases, notably during a cholera epidemic in refugee camps in Zaïre, now Democratic Republic of the Congo, but it was the source of many distinct controversies surrounding the French role at the time of Operation Noroit and the criticism of France facilitating the desertion of those responsible for the genocide and a massive refugee movement of the population to Congo (around two million people). France has accused the FPR of having provoked half of the movements by refusing the French authorities' advice not to get involved in the northwest of the country.

=== New Zealand ===
The 36-strong Royal New Zealand Air Force detachment of personnel flew out of RNZAF Base Whenuapai, New Zealand, on 25 July 1994, in a C-130H Hercules- NZ7002. The Hercules arrived in Nairobi three days later before proceeding to Entebbe airport in Uganda to begin operations on the newly named Operation Reforge. The primary mission of the detachment was to deliver food and supplies to the people of Rwanda.

The RNZAF team consisted of two full aircrews, loadmasters, maintenance personnel, RNZAF Police, medics, communications operators, and an administration team.

The RNZAF’s tented camp was set up in the shelter of a wrecked airliner, destroyed in the famous hijacking at Entebbe in 1976. Work began almost immediately, on 4 August with flights being to Goma in Zaire (now in the Democratic Republic of Congo), where many of the refugees were concentrated.

RNZAF personnel returned to New Zealand 2 months later having delivered 3.5 million pounds of freight transporting various aid, food, water and 250 refugees.

=== United States ===
After the events surrounding the Battle of Mogadishu in Somalia one year earlier, the United States refused to provide requested material aid to Rwanda. France, China, and Russia opposed involvement in what was seen as an "internal affair." Dallaire was directly "taken to task", in his words, for even suggesting that UNAMIR should raid Hutu militants' weapons caches, whose location had been disclosed to him by a government informant. The UN failed to respond adequately to Dallaire's urgent requests.

The role of the United States was directly inspired by the defeat undergone during the 1993 intervention in Somalia. Both President Bill Clinton and US Ambassador to the UN Madeleine Albright repeatedly refused to take action, and government documents that were declassified in 2004 indicate that the Clinton administration knew that Rwanda was being engulfed by genocide in April 1994 but buried the information to justify US inaction. Intelligence reports obtained using the Freedom of Information Act show that the cabinet and almost certainly the president had been told of a planned "final solution to eliminate all Tutsis" before the slaughter had reached its peak.

For two months, from April to May 1994, the US government argued over the word genocide, which is banned by the Convention for the Prevention and the Repression of Crime and Genocide, which had been adopted by the General Assembly of the United Nations on 10 December 1948. Senior US officials privately used the term genocide within 16 days of the beginning of the killings but chose not to do so publicly since Clinton had already decided not to intervene.

The Rwandan embassy in Washington, D.C., was ordered closed on July 15, 1994, with its personnel being ordered to leave within five days.

== Arms shipments ==
=== From France ===
In the early morning of January 22, 1994, a DC-8 aircraft loaded with armaments from France, including 90 boxes of Belgian-made 60 mm mortars, was confiscated by UNAMIR at Kigali International Airport. The delivery was in violation of the cease-fire clauses of the Arusha Accords, which prohibited introduction of arms into the area during the transition period. General Dallaire put the arms under joint UNAMIR-Rwandan army guard. Formally recognizing this point, the French government argued that the delivery stemmed from an old contract and hence was technically legal. Dallaire was forced to give up control over the aircraft.

=== From Mil-Tec Corporation Ltd (UK) ===
Mil-Tec Corporation Ltd, a UK company, was involved in arms supplies to the Hutu regime at least from June 1993 to mid-July 1994. Mil-Tec had been paid $4.8 million by the regime in return for invoices of $6.5 million for the arms sent. The manager of Mil-Tec, Anoop Vidyarthi, was described as a Kenyan Asian who owned a travel company in North London and was in business with Rakeesh Kumar Gupta. They both fled the UK shortly after the revelations.

- 6 June 1993 ($549,503 of ammunition from Tel Aviv to Kigali);
- 17–18 April 1994 ($853,731 of ammunition from Tel Aviv to Goma);
- 22–25 April 1994 ($681,200 of ammunition and grenades from Tel Aviv to Goma);
- 29 April - 3 May 1994 ($942,680 of ammunition, grenades, mortars and rifles from Tirana to Goma);
- 9 May 1994 ($1,023,840 of rifles, ammunition, mortars and other items from Tirana to Goma);
- 18–20 May 1994 ($1,074,549 of rifles, ammunition, mortars, rocket propelled grenades and other items from Tirana to Goma);
- 13–18 July 1994 ($753,645 of ammunition and rockets from Tirana to Kinshasa).

== Aftermath ==
=== France ===
France, one of the five permanent members of the UN Security Council, has been accused of a role that some of those answerable to France refute and claim that Operation Turquoise was an exemplary humanitarian intervention. Some use as context that in supporting a group that would become genocidal and, according to the French parliamentary report, did not hide its genocidal intentions, France had favoured the start of the genocide.

As the outgrowth of a press campaign, especially the articles written by the journalist Patrick de Saint-Exupéry that appeared in 1994 and in 1998 in the French newspaper Le Figaro, the French Parliament decided to examine the actions of France in Rwanda by using a parliamentary information mission for Rwanda. Some French Non-governmental organisations that specialise in Rwanda would have preferred a parliamentary enquiry mission, whose judicial powers would have been more extensive, to find the truth. After several months of work, the president of the parliamentary mission, former Defence Minister Paul Quilès, concluded that France was "not guilty" (December 1998).

==== 21st century ====
Ten years later, in 2004, books, films and radio and television programmes brought the controversies surrounding France's role in Rwanda back to life. Unsatisfied by the conclusions of the report from the parliamentary mission for Rwanda, some citizens and NGOs have formed a citizens' enquiry commission. After a week of work in Paris, their "provisional conclusions" were read on 27 March 2004 at a conference that they organised the enclave of the French Assemblée nationale in the presence of one of two of the original people who had publicly stated the findings of the parliamentary mission, the former deputy Pierre Brana. On April 7, 2004, a serious diplomatic incident took place between France and Rwanda during the commemoration of the genocide in Kigali. In the course of the ceremonies, the Rwandan president publicly accused France of not having apologised for its role in Rwanda but desiring to participate in the ceremonies.

In July 2004, the ministers of Foreign Affairs from both countries convened to "share the work of a memory piece" about the genocide. Rwanda announced several days later, according to a dispatch from Agence France-Presse from August 2, 2004, that "the council of ministers has adopted the organic law project to aid in the creation of the independent national commission charged with assembling proof of the implication of France in the genocide perpetrated in Rwanda in 1994". The French Minister of Foreign Affairs "took action" for the creation of the Rwandan commission.

On 22 October 2004, the International Criminal Tribunal for Rwanda officially demanded that the "Republic of France" allow former Ambassador Jean Michel Marlaud and one of his military representatives, Officer Jean Jacques Maurin to respond to the demand of the defence of the presumed mastermind of the genocide, Colonel Bagosora, pending judgement. Bagosra was the first Rwandan officer to have graduated from the École des Officiers in France.

On 27 November 2004, in a televised debate on France 3 after the showing of the French film Tuez les Tous ('Kill Them All'), created by three students of political science, the president of the parliamentary mission for information for Rwanda, Paul Quilès, stated for the first time "France asks to be pardoned by the people of Rwanda, but not by their government".

On 6 April 2014, Rwandan President Paul Kagame repeated the charges against France as "direct role of Belgium and France in the political preparation for the genocide" in an interview with Jeune Afrique magazine. He also accused French soldiers who took part in a military humanitarian mission in the south of the former Belgian colony of being both accomplices and "actors" in the bloodbath.

===== Rwandan report of 2008 =====
On 5 August 2008, an independent Rwandan commission said that France was aware of preparations for the 1994 Rwanda genocide and helped train the ethnic Hutu militia perpetrators. It accused France of training Hutu militias responsible for the slaughter, helping to plan the genocide and participating in the killings. The report accused 33 senior French military and political officials on Tuesday of involvement in the genocide. Among those named were President François Mitterrand, Prime Minister Édouard Balladur; Foreign Minister Alain Juppé; and his chief aide, Dominique de Villepin. "French soldiers themselves directly were involved in assassinations of Tutsis and Hutus accused of hiding Tutsis," said the report, which was compiled by a team of investigators from the Justice Ministry.

=== United States ===
In 2001, the US government declassified documents that confirm the US attitude, which had not taken into account the reality of the situation that started in January 1994. Clinton and Albright later expressed regret for their inaction. Clinton went on to provide major funding for the Genocide Memorial in Kigali. He also visited Rwanda in 1998 and 2005, apologised both times, and said that he "expressed regret for what he says was his 'personal failure' to prevent the slaughter of an estimated 800,000 people." Moreover, through the Clinton Foundation, he has attempted amends by sponsoring initiatives to help rebuild Rwanda.

=== Belgium ===
After the genocide, a traumatized Belgium began a parliamentary reflection, with the Senate starting the Commission d'enquête parlementaire (Parliamentary Inquiry Commission), which inquired and composed a parliamentary report.

On 6 April 2000, Belgian Prime Minister Guy Verhofstadt attended the ceremony commemorating the sixth anniversary of the genocide in Kigali. He took the occasion to make apologies and took on "the responsibility of my country, according to what we have learnt afterwards in the name of my country and of my people, I beg your pardon."

=== Other African states ===
The OAU, which is now the African Union, created a report on the genocide in 2000. Before the UNAMIR mission led by General Roméo Dallaire (military) and Jacques-Roger Booh-Booh (civilian), the OAU had indeed sent a Neutral Military Observation Group, known by its French initials as NMOG.

=== China ===
To honour the lost and the injured, the Rwandan embassy and Chinese communities organized events in Beijing and a few Rwandan communities. Memorials were marked with silence, prayers, songs and presentations on the history of Rwanda and expressed the hope that the world could learn from the tragedy.

== See also ==
- Mogadishu Line
