= Henry Kwami Anyidoho =

Ghanaian military officer

- Born: 13 July 1940 (age 86); Tanyigbe, Gold Coast (now Tanyigbe, Ghana)
- Military career
- Allegiance: Ghana
- Branch: Ghana Army
- Rank: Major-general
- Units: UNEF, UNIFIL, ECOMOG, UNTAC, UNAMIR, UNAMID
- Awards: Distinguished Service Order for Gallantry
- Other work: author

Henry Kwami Anyidoho (born 13 July 1940) is a former Ghanaian military officer.

== Biography ==
Henry Kwami Anyidoho was born on 13 July 1940 in Tanyigbe, Ghana. He graduated from the US Marine Staff College in Virginia and the Ghana Military Academy and was commissioned into the Ghanaian army's Signal Corps in 1965. Since then he has served in various capacities in Ghana’s armed forces, including as Commanding Officer of the Ghana Military Academy and Commander of the Northern Command of the Army, as well as numerous UN peacekeeping missions.

During the 1994 Rwandan genocide, a Ghanaian contingent led by General Anyidoho was deployed to serve in UNAMIR (United Nations Assistance Mission for Rwanda) under Canadian General Roméo Dallaire. Anyidoho, who had experience in peacekeeping missions in Lebanon, Cambodia, and Liberia, served as General Dallaire's Deputy Commander in addition to his role as head of the Ghanaian contingent. In Dallaire's book, Shake Hands With the Devil, Anyidoho and his men are frequently singled out for praise for their courage and resourcefulness, and are given credit for sheltering thousands of Tutsis and Hutu moderates, saving them from certain death. When the Belgian government decided to withdraw their peacekeeping contingent, the UN leadership instructed Dallaire to prepare to withdraw UNAMIR. Dallaire sought advice from Anyidoho, who assured him that he and his Ghanaian troops would not leave. Thus assured, Dallaire decided to keep UNAMIR operational.

For twelve years Anyidoho was also the Chairman of the Ghana Telecom Board of Directors. He has also contributed chapters to edited books on international peacekeeping and is the author of the book on his tenure in Rwanda: Guns Over Kigali . He was decorated with the Distinguished Service Order for Gallantry.

== UN peacekeeping missions ==
- UNEF, Sinai
- UNIFIL, Lebanon – Chief Military Press and Information Officer
- ECOMOG, Liberia, 1990
- UNTAC, Cambodia
- UNAMIR, Rwanda, 1994 – Deputy Force Commander and Chief of Staff during Rwandan genocide
- UNAMID, Darfur, since 2005 – Joint Deputy AU–UN Special Representative
