= Will to Intervene =

Genocide research project

The Will to Intervene (W2I) Project is a research initiative created by Lieut. General (retired) Roméo Dallaire, Senior Fellow at the Montreal Institute for Genocide and Human Rights Studies (MIGS), and Dr. Frank Chalk, MIGS Director, that aims to operationalize the principles of the responsibility to protect within national governments.

== Report ==
Led by researcher Kyle Matthews, more than 80 interviews were conducted with high-level policy-makers, members of Congress, parliamentarians, NGO representatives, and journalists in Canada and the United States, some for the first time on record. These interviews culminated in the publication of a policy report, Mobilizing the Will to Intervene: Leadership and Action to Prevent Mass Atrocities, in September 2009. This report was disseminated amongst the highest levels of the American and Canadian governments, think tanks, and non-governmental organisations. The report was subsequently re-edited and published as a book in 2010.

The project describes itself as follows:

The fundamental goal the W2I report, entitled Mobilizing the Will to Intervene: Leadership and Action to Prevent Mass Atrocities, is to identify strategic and practical steps to raise the capacity of government officials, legislators, civil servants, non-governmental organizations (NGOs), advocacy groups, journalists, and media owners and managers to build the political will to prevent mass atrocities. The report provides practical policy recommendations to make this goal a reality. The report draws on interviews with more than 80 foreign policy practitioners and opinion shapers in Canada and the United States. Many of the interviewees participated directly in Canadian and American government decision making during the 1994 Rwandan Genocide and the 1999 Kosovo crisis, which exemplify a failure to act and a strong will to act. The W2I Project's researchers also wanted to understand what civil society groups and the news media could have done to ramp up the pressure on Prime Minister Chrétien and President Clinton to save lives in Rwanda. They wanted to learn if civil society played a role in the decisions of Canada and the United States to preserve lives in Kosovo and what considerations propelled the decision to intervene. They designed their questions with an eye to the future, hunting for "lessons learned", informed not only by their interviews, but also by scholarly studies of Canadian and U.S. Government policies. The report was made public in Canada on 22 September 2009. The Canadian parliamentary launch occurred on 1 October and featured distinguished panel of experts who discussed W2I's policy recommendations for the benefit of parliamentarians.

The W2I project assembled a Research Steering Committee consisting of a distinguished group of prominent American and Canadian foreign policy experts and politicians to guide the researchers. The members include Maurice Baril, Ed Broadbent, Fred C. Fischer, Tom Flanagan, Robert Fowler, Yoine Goldstein, Bill Graham, David A. Hamburg, Ted Koppel, Juan É. Méndez, Alex Neve, André Pratte, Kenneth Prewitt, David Scheffer, Hugh D. Segal, Jennifer Allen Simons, Janice Gross Stein, Allan Thompson, Thomas G. Weiss, and Harvey Yarosky.

== Book ==
In September 2010, the report was edited and published as a book by McGill-Queens University Press. The book version of the Will to Intervene Report was reviewed by Dr Ramesh Thakur in the Literary Review of Canada (December, 2010) and replied to by the Will to Intervene authors in the subsequent issue (January 2011).

== Support ==
Since the publication of the report, the Will to Intervene project has continued to try to raise awareness amongst policy makers in the US and Canada about the crucial importance of genocide prevention as opposed to reaction. The W2I presented the report's recommendations to American policy makers at the United States Institute of Peace on 21 September 2009. They subsequently conducted a panel discussion on 1 October 2009 on Parliament Hill, putting forward the case for genocide prevention as a national priority to members of Parliament and senators.

The Obama administration has put in place three of the recommendations argued in the report. In May 2010, President Obama's National Security Strategy stated a commitment to proactive engagement in preventing mass atrocities and genocide. And then in June 2010, National Security Advisor James L. Jones, created an Interagency Policy Committee on Preventing Mass Atrocities. In addition, the US Senate passed Senate Concurrent Resolution 71 supporting genocide prevention, a resolution which the W2I team helped to draft. In 2011, the Obama administration announced the establishment of a new Atrocities Prevention Board, stating such prevention as a core moral responsibility and national security interest.

To garner further support for genocide prevention, the W2I team has conducted policy briefings, presentations and civic dialogues to diffuse the report's findings across North America. On 27 November 2009, W2I carried out a civic dialogue in Vancouver, which numerous politicians from all levels of government, business people, academics, NGO directors, journalists and religious leaders and public intellectuals attended. Through this interactive medium, W2I managed to garner the support of a large variety of influential people, leading to a Municipal Proclamation by the Mayor Gregor Robertson of Vancouver calling 12 November 2010 "Will to Intervene Day". The Will to Intervene Project plans to undertake more of these civic dialogues in the future across North America to inform and galvanize groups of local, influential and interested people who can promote the Will to Intervene Project at all levels of government.

The project has gained support from numerous organisations, including the Genocide Prevention Group, an All-Party group of Canadian members of parliament, the Canadian Federation of University Women and the student-led anti-genocide group STAND.

== New studies ==
Now that the diffusion of the W2I report's findings in Canada and the United States is well under way, the W2I project is setting its sights further afield. The project plans to help set up similar research initiatives in South Africa and the United Kingdom.
