= Tousignant =

Tousignant may refer to:

- Chloe Tousignant, a fictional character in Zoo (TV series)
- Élise Paré-Tousignant (1937–2018), Canadian music administrator and pedagogue
- Claude Tousignant (b. 1932), Canadian artist
- Guy Tousignant (b. 1941), Canadian soldier
- Henri Tousignant (b. 1937), Canadian politician
- Luc Tousignant (b. 1958), Canadian football player
- Mathieu Tousignant (b. 1989), Canadian ice hockey player
