= Jacques-Roger Booh-Booh =

Cameroonian diplomat

Minister of Foreign Affairs
- In office 16 May 1988 – 27 November 1992
- President: Paul Biya
- Preceded by: Philippe Mataga
- Succeeded by: Ferdinand Oyono

Special Representative of the Secretary-General for Rwanda
- In office 1993 – 1 July 1994
- Succeeded by: Shahryar Khan

Ambassador of Cameroon to France
- In office 1983–1988

Ambassador of Cameroon to the Soviet Union
- In office 1981–1983

Personal details
- Born: 5 February 1938 (age 88) Manak, Cameroon
- Citizenship: Cameroonian
- Occupation: Politician, diplomat

Jacques-Roger Booh-Booh (born February 5, 1938) is a Cameroonian politician and diplomat. He was the Minister of External Relations of Cameroon from 1988 to 1992 and the head of United Nations Assistance Mission for Rwanda (UNAMIR).

== Early life and career ==
Booh-Booh was born in Manak, Cameroon. Working at the Ministry of External Relations, he was Head of the Department of African Affairs, Director for Asia and Africa, Deputy Permanent Representative to the United Nations, and Ambassador to Morocco, Greece and UNESCO. He was Cameroon's Ambassador to the Soviet Union from 1981 to 1983 and its Ambassador to France from 1983 until he was named Minister of External Relations on May 16, 1988. He also wrote a book, published in Paris in 1982, called The Decolonization of Namibia: a Usurped Mandate.

He has four children and one grandson.

== Rwandan genocide ==
Booh-Booh's role in Rwanda has been the subject of harsh criticism, primarily by Lieutenant-General Roméo Dallaire and his supporters, contending that he played an instrumental role in forestalling any UN military preventive action against the Rwandan genocide that appeared imminent in the country in mid-1994. For his part, in his 2005 book Le Patron de Dallaire Parle (Dallaire's Boss Speaks) Booh-Booh strongly criticized the account and actions of Dallaire, who was the commander of the UNAMIR forces on the ground in 1994.

In 1993, Booh-Booh was head of mission of a small force of UNAMIR military personnel (approximately 2,548) that was dispatched by the United Nations to Rwanda, in an effort to aid in the implementation of the Arusha Accords and to keep the peace between Hutu and Tutsi ethnic groups. According to Dallaire's autobiography, Shake Hands With the Devil, Dallaire had been given warnings from a reliable government source of an impending extermination campaign by Hutu extremists against the country's Tutsi minority and moderate Hutus. He passed this information along to the UN's headquarters in New York and reported his intent to inspect alleged arms caches. He was ordered not to intervene, and his later requests to increase the UNAMIR force by 5,000 peace-keeping soldiers were also denied.

Shortly before President Juvénal Habyarimana's assassination, Booh-Booh was also criticized for spending Easter weekend 1994 with Habyarimana, raising questions about the SRSG's impartiality. While Booh-Booh claimed this was purely for fact-finding purposes, the Rwandese Patriotic Front filed a formal complaint regarding Booh-Booh's neutrality. This further worsened the RPF's confidence in UNAMIR.

The United Nations, restrained by the political interests of the permanent members of the United Nations Security Council and reluctance of the international community, remained passive before and throughout the predicted genocide of some 800,000 (some sources estimate one million) people that took place from April to July 1994, finally ending around the time the predominantly Tutsi Rwandan Patriotic Front took the nation's capital, Kigali, on July 18, 1994. As the genocide was occurring, the UNAMIR peace-keeping force was reduced from over 2,500 to a mere 270 soldiers. Booh-Booh was replaced as Special Representative on 1 July 1994 by Shahryar Khan of Pakistan.

In a colloquium held in the French Senate on April 4, 2002, Booh-Booh stated that claiming a genocide had occurred in Rwanda was "closer to the politics of surrealism than to the truth".
