= Operation Gabriel =

Operation Gabriel was the codename for the British military contribution in Rwanda as part of the UN Assistance Mission for Rwanda UNAMIR during the Rwandan genocide. British soldiers were deployed to Rwanda as part of a wider peacekeeping force that aimed to control the effects of the ongoing conflict and resulting genocide. British troops arrived in the country in August after just five days preparation, starting with a 60-strong advance group that aimed to repair infrastructure damaged by the conflict in the region, and to prepare for a mass evacuation of British civilians from the region. Six hundred troops followed the initial advance party shortly after, and contained elements from both Army and RAF logistics, support and infantry personnel. British troops were withdrawn in November 1994.

Due to the sudden nature of the conflict, refugee camps had sprung up quickly around Rwanda to provide for those displaced by the conflict, and to shelter those who were being targeted by the perpetrators of the genocide. 23 Parachute Field Ambulance RAMC set up primary health clinics for the refugees of the camps, and provided both medical support and defence of the country's three operating hospitals. The hospitals were staffed by environmental health teams and trained military surgeons teams to treat casualties of disease and injury as a result of the conflict. After being stationed in the North of Rwanda for a month, 23 Parachute Field Ambulance were relocated by the Canadian Major General Roméo Dallaire, to halt the mass evacuation of refugees into Zaire, located at the Southern end of Lake Kivu. 23 Parachute Field Ambulance was responsible for the aid of over 125,000 civilians over the 4-month deployment.

As Rwanda had suffered widespread damage to infrastructure, including electricity supplies and roadways, the sappers of 9 Parachute Squadron RE were deployed to repair roads, reconnect electricity supplies and install basic sanitary equipment.

During the early stages of the United Nations mission in Rwanda, the UN Peacekeeping force had found themselves largely without efficient vehicles and methods of transportation to carry out their mission - namely ensuring that the terms of the Arusha Accords were being upheld. Despite the collapse of the Accords, the United Nations peacekeeping force remained in-theatre, but were hampered by logistical problems that made the transportation of materiel and civilians difficult. 63 Airborne Close Support Squadron RLC was deployed to allow the United Nations force to transport cargo and civilians to remote locations. 20,000 refugees and 1500 tons of material were carried during their time in the theatre.

Infantry protection was given by A Company 2nd Battalion The Princess of Wales Royal Regiment over the course of deployment. Additional units consisted of detachment from 30 Signal Regiment, 29 Movement Control Regiment, 49 Explosive Ordnance Disposal (EOD), RE, 9 Supply Regiment, 160 Provost Company and the Specialist Team Royal Engineers (STRE).
