= Samuel Koku Anyidoho =

Ghanaian politician

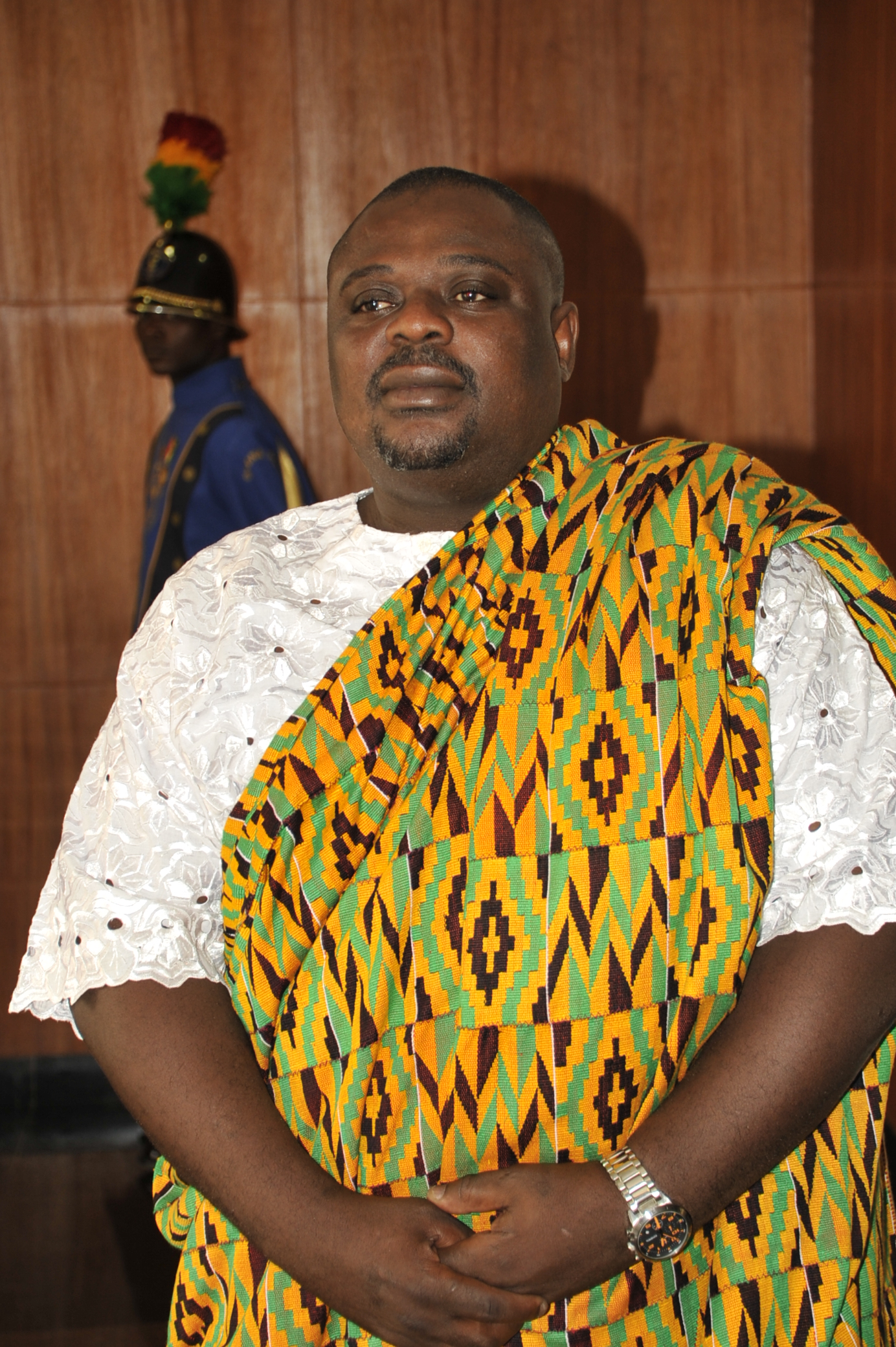
- Born: 13 January 1971 (age 55)
- Education: 1997 University of East Anglia, Norwich, MA in Development Studies 2007 University of Ghana, MA in Communications
- Occupation: Founder/ CEO Atta-Mills Institute
- Title: Head of Communication, Office of the President Deputy General - Secretary (National Democratic Congress)
- Term: 2009 - 2013 2014 - 2018
- Political party: National Democratic Congress (NDC)
- Children: 4
- Father: General Henry Kwami Anyidoho
- Website: https://kokuanyidoho.wordpress.com/

Samuel Koku Sitsofe Anyidoho (born 13 January 1971) is a Ghanaian politician who serves as Founder and President of the Atta Mills Institute. He served as Head of Communications under the Presidency of John Atta Mills from 2009 to 2012. He was also Deputy General-Secretary of the National Democratic Congress from 2014 to 2018.

== Early life ==
Koku Anyidoho was born on, Wednesday, 13 January 1971, at the 37 Military Hospital in Accra. His father, Major General Henry Kwami Anyidoho is a retired Major General in the Ghanaian Army whose is mostly remembered for his work during the civil war in Rwanda, and his mother was the late, Mrs. Mercy Abla Mivormawu Anyidoho (Nee Tsegah). General Anyidoho hails from, Tanyigbe, in the Ho District of the Volta Region, while Mercy Anyidoho hailed from, Anyako, in the Keta District of the Volta Region.

== Education ==
Koku Anyidoho began his educational journey at Kotoka Primary School, Burma-Camp, Accra, Ghana, where he had his kindergarten and Primary School education between 1975 and 1982.

Koku Anyidoho began his Secondary School education in Mawuli School, Ho, Volta Region in 1982, before transferring to Achimota School, Accra, Ghana, and sat for the General Certificate Examinations (GCE) Ordinary Level (O Level), in 1987. Samuel Koku Anyidoho then proceeded to, Labone Secondary School, Accra, Ghana, where he sat for the General Certificate Examinations (GCE) Advanced Level (A Level), in 1989.

Koku Anyidoho entered the University of Ghana Legon, in 1990 and graduated in 1993 with a Bachelor of Arts (Honours) Sociology & English In 1995, Koku Anyidoho attended the University of East Anglia, Norwich, United Kingdom, and graduated with a Master of Arts (MA) in Development Studies. In 2005, Koku Anyidoho gained admission to the School of Communications Studies, University of Ghana, Legon, for an MA Programme, in Communications.

== Working life ==
Koku started work as a teacher, at the, Chiraa Secondary School, in the Brong Ahafo Region of Ghana, when he had to serve a compulsory post-A Level, National Service, between September 1989 and June 1990.

Another compulsory National Service, found Koku working at the Ghana Broadcasting Corporation (GBC), after completing his First Degree in 1993. It was Koku's stint at GBC, which opened-up his hitherto latent talent in the areas of, media, broadcasting, script writing, and the whole spectrum of communications.

After returning from his Masters programme in Norwich, Koku worked with the Ghana Office of the, United Nations High Commission for Refugees (UNHCR), as a Social Services Officer and worked directly with mostly Liberian and Sierra Leonean refugees who lived in Ghana.

He was part of the team that berthed the first batch of Sierra Leonean refugees who arrived in Ghana aboard a Ghanaian fishing vessel.

Koku was with the UNHCR between January 1997 and September 1998.

Towards the end of 1998, Koku Anyidoho was employed by the Metropolitan And Allied Bank (MAB), which was the first private commercial bank in Ghana. MAB was founded by Ghanaian and Malaysian Interests and was headed by Mr. Alex Ashiabor, who was two-time Governor of the Central Bank of Ghana. At MAB, Koku worked in the Marketing Department, was Executive Assistant to the Executive Chairman, and was also the Head of Treasury and Investments. It was while working for MAB that Koku Anyidoho was called personally by Professor John Evans Atta-Mills into mainstream and frontline politics.

As a politician, Samuel Koku Anyidoho served as the Head of Communications and Presidential Spokesperson at the Office of The President, Republic of Ghana, between 2009 and 2012.

As the Head of Communications at the Office of The President, Samuel Koku Anyidoho worked with President John Evans Atta-Mills (January 2009 – 24 July 2012), and also President John Dramani Mahama (24 July 2012 – 6 January 2013).

Prior to serving as Head Of Communications at the Office of The President, Samuel Koku Anyidoho was the Head of Communications and Key Campaign Strategist for the Atta-Mills Campaign Team (January 2006 – December 2008) – and was instrumental in the success of the Atta Mills campaign.

Between December 2014 and November 2018, Samuel Koku Anyidoho was Deputy General Secretary in-charge of Operations for the National Democratic Congress (NDC) Party – Founded by His Excellency Jerry John Rawlings.

Koku Anyidoho was the Speech Writer for President John Evans Atta-Mills.
