= Virtual War Memorial Australia =

- Virtual War Memorial Australia
- Abbreviation: VWMA
- Established: 2014
- Type: Nonprofit
- Registration no.: 89613555347
- Legal status: Charity
- Purpose: Memorial, Education
- Headquarters: Adelaide, South Australia
- Services: War Memorial, Archives, Research, Education, Genealogy
- Chief executive officer: Sharyn Roberts
- Patron: Peter Cosgrove
- Revenue: $322,295.00 (2021-2022)
- Expenses: $324,820.00 (2021-2022)
- Funding: Fundraising, Donations, Bequests, Grants
- Website: vwma.org.au

The Virtual War Memorial Australia is an online war memorial designed to commemorate all Australian service personnel. The conflicts covered by the Virtual War Memorial include the Boer War, World War One, World War Two, Vietnam War as well as all modern conflicts and peacekeeping operations. Founded in 2014, staff are primarily based in Adelaide, South Australia.

Commemoration pages begin with little to no information, relying on data from Nominal Rolls such as those held with the Australian War Memorial and Department of Veteran Affairs. The remaining information is contributed by staff, volunteers, family members and the general public. Users can upload evidence from documents, photos, artifacts as well as biographies and anecdotal stories.

== Schools Program ==
The Schools Program is run in partnership with the South Australian Department of Education with the aim of supporting schools in delivering relevant Australian Curriculum and specialist matriculation content. Primarily, the focus is on:

- Year 9 - World War I (1914-1918)
- Year 10 - World War II (1939-45)

Students participate by performing research on a selected serviceperson and then submitting to the website. Teachers are able to download submitted work for assessment. Students whose contributions are of a high calibre are awarded a Certificate of Commendation.

== Funding ==
The main funding for the Memorial derives from grants. In 2019, the Virtual War Memorial Australia secured a three year grant of $400,000 AUD for the period ending June 2022.

The funding of the Memorial was raised in Federal Parliament by Member for Mayo Rebekha Sharkie on Monday, 14 October 2019.

The annual fundraising luncheon, 'Don't Forget Me Cobber' is held in November. Past events have been held at places such as Adelaide Oval and are often attended by Members of Parliament and schools who have participated in the Schools Program.

== See also ==
- Gulf War
- International response to the Rwandan genocide
- 1999 East Timorese crisis
- Iraq War
- Afghanistan
- Australian military involvement in peacekeeping
- List of Australian military memorials
