= Shiva Kumar =

Shiva Kumar may refer to:

- Shiva Kumar (general) (born 1948), Indian Army general
- Shiva Kumar Mandal, Nepalese politician
- Shiva Kumar Rai (1919–1995), Nepali language writer and politician from Darjeeling, India

== See also ==
- Shiv Kumar (disambiguation)
