= Montreal Institute for Genocide and Human Rights Studies =

Research institute in Quebec, Canada

The Montreal Institute for Genocide and Human Rights Studies (MIGS) was a research institute based at Concordia University in Montreal, Quebec, Canada. It was founded in 1986 and promotes human rights awareness, in the field of genocide and mass atrocities by hosting frequent events, publishing policy briefs, engaging in counter activism on the web, and many other programs. Its keystone project was the Will to Intervene (W2I) Project which, under the advisement of Lt. General Roméo Dallaire and MIGS' Director Frank Chalk, builds domestic political will in Canada and the United States to prevent future mass atrocities. The Institute was closed in 2024 by Concordia University citing budgetary constraints.

== About ==
The Montreal Institute for Genocide and Human Rights Studies (MIGS) was recognized internationally as Canada's leading research and advocacy Institute for genocide and mass atrocity crimes prevention, MIGS conducted in-depth scholarly research and proposed concrete policy recommendations to resolve conflicts before they degenerate into mass atrocity crimes. MIGS achieved national and international recognition for its national interest approach to the prevention of genocide and mass atrocity crimes from policymakers, academics, leading research institutes, and the media. Until its closure, MIGS was Canada's leading voice and international partner on Responsibility to Protect issues.

== Mission ==
MIGS had the following stated goals:

- Develop major research programs focusing on the prevention and punishment of genocide and other mass atrocity crimes.
- Collect and disseminate research results to specialist professionals and to the wider public.
- Create and advocate for innovative public policies to prevent future mass atrocities.
- Educate students, academics, journalists, government officials, civil society groups, and the wider public on threats to the national interest arising from genocide and mass atrocity crimes.
- Provide professional training and build mass atrocity awareness and prevention capacity of international and national leaders in key fields.
- Develop and foster fruitful relationships and networks at the local, national and international levels by working in collaboration with leading organizations, institutions and research institutes.

== History ==
The institute was founded by Frank Chalk, a professor in the history department, and the late Kurt Jonassohn in 1986. The institute's focus was on its Will to Intervene Project, which was led by Kyle Matthews, a former Canadian diplomat, and MIGS' Senior Deputy Roméo Dallaire who had been a Senior Fellow at MIGS since 2006 and cofounded the W2I Project. MIGS also had a large number of interns who assisted with MIGS' initiatives and projects. In recent years, Concordia faculty members and graduate students from Communications, English, Geography, and Political Science have joined in its work, as had colleagues from McGill University and the University of Quebec in Montreal.

MIGS developed and managed major research programs focused on the prevention of genocide and crimes against humanity, educated comparatively about genocide, the responsibility to protect, and helped survivors and their children end their isolation by building bridges with other survivors of genocide and mass atrocity crimes.

Drawing on its research, MIGS aimed to further understanding of the history, sociology and international legal frameworks pertaining to genocide, crimes against humanity, and reconciliation in their wake. MIGS advanced these goals by organizing workshops and conferences, sponsoring lectures, issuing reports, preparing books and articles, and training students who specialize in genocide studies at undergraduate, masters and doctoral levels. MIGS worked locally, nationally and internationally to educate members of the public, the media, and government.

== Initiatives and projects ==
Over the years, MIGS had developed a number of research initiatives and projects which aim to collect and disseminate knowledge about the historical origins of mass killings, and seeking to prevent future atrocities of this kind. The staff also produced a number of articles fitting within the scope of each project.

=== Will to Intervene (W2I) ===
The Will to Intervene Project (W2I) was MIGS' primary project. It was started by Director Frank Chalk and retired Lt. General Roméo Dallaire as an effort to create domestic building domestic political will in Canada and the United States to prevent future mass atrocities. It also aims to understand how to mobilize domestic political will in order to prevent or halt genocide and mass atrocities.

The W2I team works to advance public policy on mass atrocity crimes prevention through the education and training of policymakers, elected officials, diplomats, journalists and civil society groups. W2I organises conferences, policy briefings, specialized training sessions and civic dialogues to generate awareness and understanding of what policies can be put in place to make "never again" a reality.

W2I's ground-breaking 2009 policy report, Mobilizing The Will To Intervene: Leadership and Action to Prevent Mass Atrocities, contains concrete policy recommendations for the governments of Canada and of the United States, as well as recommendations for journalists and civil society groups, which will advance this goal. Based on 80 interviews carried out with high level Canadian and American policymakers it details the long term consequences to Canadian and American security, public health and prosperity that result from mass atrocities, which make engaging in the prevention of such atrocities in each county's national interest. It was later published as a book in 2010 by McGill-Queens University Press.

=== Digital Mass Atrocity (DMAP) Lab ===
The Digital Mass Atrocity Prevention Lab (DMAP Lab) was a policy hub working to combat genocidal ideologies online and work as a counter force against extremists and their ideas. Modern social media enables terrorist groups to disseminate propaganda, advertise their crimes, incite violence, radicalize and persuade disenfranchised young adults to join their hateful cause. The project asks what governments, international organizations, civil society groups and individual citizens can do to counter online extremism as the fight against religious extremism increasingly takes place in cyberspace.

==== Goals ====
- Analyze key actors and drivers of online extremism and radicalization
- Develop tools and strategies to counter extremists who use social media and other digital technologies as a weapon of war
- Propose policy recommendations to governments, non-governmental organizations (NGOs), United Nations (UN) agencies and other stakeholders
- Provide specialized training and policy advice
- Bring together policymakers, journalists, academics, tech expects, human rights activists and community leaders to create a global network as a force for good

=== Media Monitoring Project ===
The Media Monitoring Project was intended to provide early warnings of genocide, crimes against humanity, ethnic cleansing, and serious war crimes by monitoring the domestic news media (newspapers, radio, television and online sources) in at-risk countries. It also seeks to inform policy makers, academics, NGO workers and students about what government-owned media in countries at risk tell their people in their own language. In order to get the best understanding of the situation and provide an overall account of what the people on the ground are being told, the project covers both government-owned and privately owned domestic media.

This project monitors the domestic media, both government owned and privately owned, in high priority countries such as Sudan, Côte d'Ivoire, Somalia and the Democratic Republic of Congo in order to act as an early warning system to help prevent genocide and mass atrocity crimes.

=== Professional Training Program on the Prevention of Mass Atrocities ===
Organized in cooperation with the Human Rights Research and Education Centre, this program is tailored to mid- to senior-level professionals interested in the prevention and interdiction of mass atrocity crimes. It is a two to three day conference, which includes workshops, guest speakers and panel discussions. The training program is divided into several thematic sessions presented by internationally recognized experts in the field of human rights and international affairs.

==== Aim of the program ====
- Providing participants with opportunities to deepen their knowledge
- Providing participants with opportunities to hone their skills through training sessions on topics including international law, the Responsibility to Protect, Boko Haram, child soldiers, and humanitarian affairs. MIGS works with instructors from the Child Soldiers Initiative, the Canadian Parliament, the Canadian Forces, and more
- Providing participants with networking opportunities to expand their contacts, to identify new partnerships, and to broaden their knowledge
- Encouraging participants to consider the intersection of their work with other human rights issues

=== The Raoul Wallenberg Legacy of Leadership Project ===
With funding from the Swedish Institute (Svenska Institutet), MIGS organized a series of events to increase awareness among youth and the general public about the Swedish diplomat Raoul Wallenberg, who is accredited with rescuing the lives of up to one hundred thousand Jews during the Second World War in Budapest, Hungary.

=== Memoirs of Holocaust survivors in Canada ===
The project to collect unpublished diaries and memoirs written by Holocaust survivors in Canada was initiated some years ago by Professors Mervin Butovsky and Kurt Jonassohn. They thought it important that these documents be preserved as a valuable part of the historical record because their contents would differ in significant ways from interview testimonies. Some of these differences are explored in a paper.

The collected manuscripts were deposited in the Archives of Concordia University with the addition of an abstract and a list of key words with explanations. The location of towns and villages was ascertained by consulting standard reference works. The location of camps was facilitated by consulting Weinmann who identifies over 2,000 camps. These memoirs are now accessible to interested scholars by consulting the Concordia University Archives.

The abstracts and key words of all of the manuscripts collected to date are available.

== Closure ==
Concordia University announced the closure of the Institute on November 1, 2024.
