= Luc Marchal =

Belgian military personnel

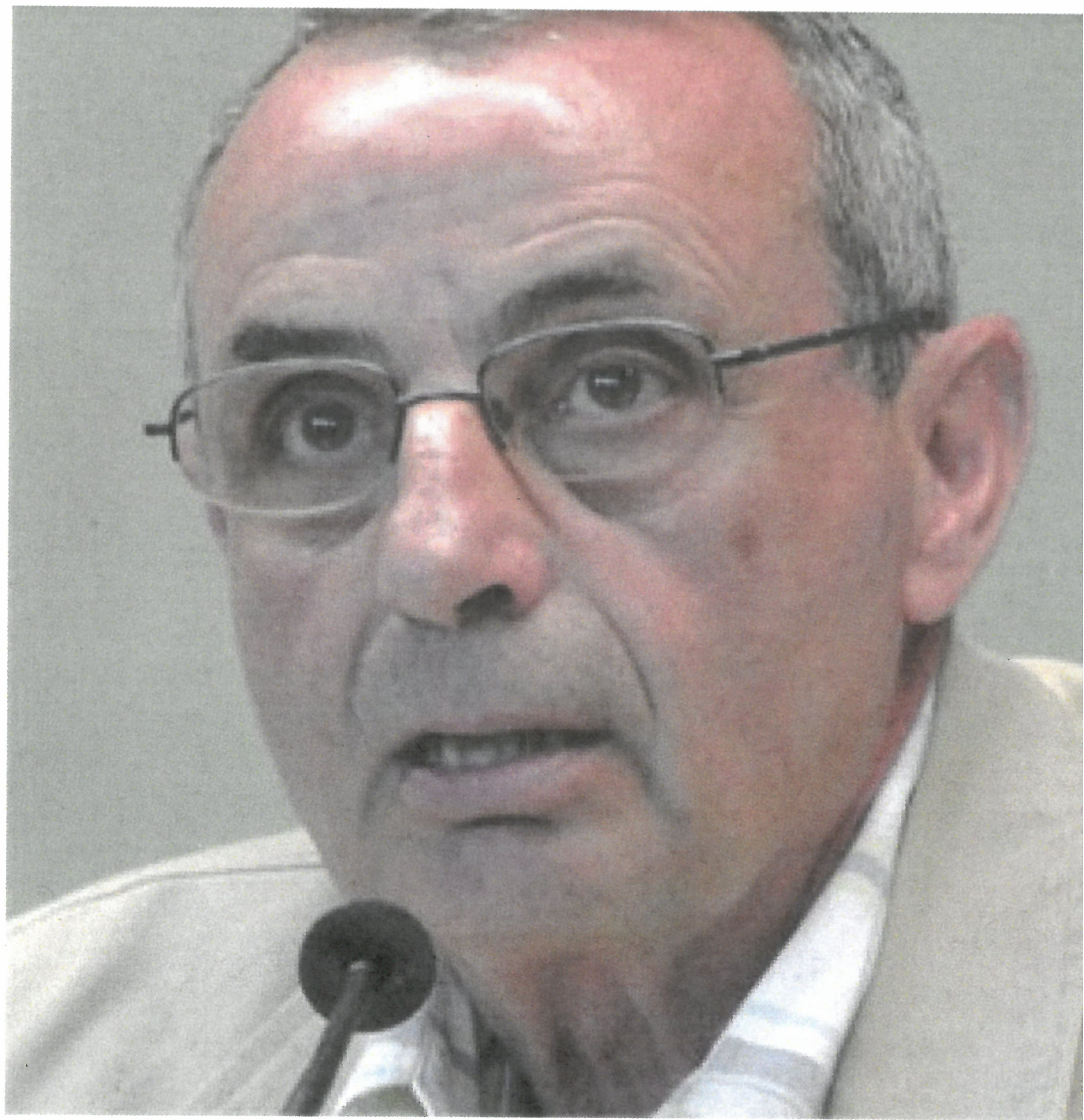
Luc Marchal

Colonel Luc Marchal is a retired officer of the armed forces of Belgium. He is known for being the senior officer in the Belgian peacekeeping contingent during the 1994 Rwandan genocide, as well as the United Nations Assistance Mission for Rwanda (UNAMIR) sector commander for the capital Kigali.

== Background ==
Marchal had, by 1994, accumulated thirty years of experience in the Belgian military, fifteen of them as a paracommando. Before his Rwanda assignment, he had been chief of staff to the Minister of Defense. Marchal had five years of experience working in Zaire, and his United Nations Assistance Mission for Rwanda (UNAMIR) commander, Canadian Lieutenant General Roméo Dallaire, praised him, stating, "Luc carried no colonial baggage" and that he "had a special knack for working with troops from less sophisticated armies."

== Service in Rwanda 1993/94 ==
Marchal landed in Rwanda on 9 December 1993. He was the most senior officer in the 440-troop strong Belgian contribution to UNAMIR. As the best trained and equipped contingent in the force, the Belgians formed the backbone of the force. Marchal had been given the command in October and, before leaving, had complained that the contingent did not have enough firepower if he needed to evacuate. He was reassured, "You're going to Club Med." Belgium was eager to send a contingent to UNAMIR to protect the large number of Belgian citizens in the Rwanda and offer an excuse for their withdrawal from the United Nations mission in Somalia. On several occasions, Marchal asked Brussels for guidance to direct his operations. He was never provided with directives, or even rules of engagement to govern what the Belgian peacekeepers could and could not do.

Dallaire became increasingly frustrated that UNAMIR was expected to operate in a total lack of information about the country and current events. When his request to United Nations headquarters for an intelligence gathering capability was denied because such a capability was considered incompatible with peacekeeping, he asked Marchal to pass on a request for assistance to Belgian General Information and Security Service (SGR), which eventually resulted in a two-person cell and small intelligence network that directed information to Brussels, rather than Dallaire.

Marchal was also given command of UNAMIR's Kigali Sector, where his major responsibility was the "Kigali Weapons Secure Area" (KWSA), a zone in a 10-kilometer radius from the Kigali city center in which military units, including both the Rwandan Armed Forces (FAR) and the rebel Rwandan Patriotic Front (RPF), would be required to store their weapons and ammunition. The weapons-free zone was a cornerstone of the 1993 Arusha Accords that ended the Rwandan Civil War. Marchal oversaw the successful movement of an RPF battalion to the Conseil National pour le Développement (CND), a prominent government building, on 27 December 1993 to ensure the safety of RPF transitional deputy prime minister Jacques Bihozagera. However, when he protested that the 600 RPF soldiers were carrying loaded weapons, in clear violation of the Kigali Weapons Secure Area, he was informed that the Arusha Accords provision did not apply within the CND.

On 10 January, Faustin Twagiramungu, who was chosen as the transitional prime minister, informed Dallaire that he had made contact with an informant within the Interahamwe militia. Dallaire sent Marchal to the meeting the next day with the informant, codenamed "Jean-Pierre." "Jean-Pierre" described a complex process of training, organizing and arming militias in preparation for the extermination of Tutsi. Dallaire would describe his reaction: "Finally it looked like we could identify the third force, grab hold of it and wrestle it down. After months of being forced to act after the fact, we had a chance to seize the initiative." Marchal was ordered to plan for four simultaneous raids on the arms caches reported by "Jean-Pierre." Both Dallaire and Marchal perceived the intended raids as being well within their mandate, the caches themselves being a violation of the KWSA and the arming of militias being a violation of the Arusha Accords and threat to the safety of UNAMIR itself.

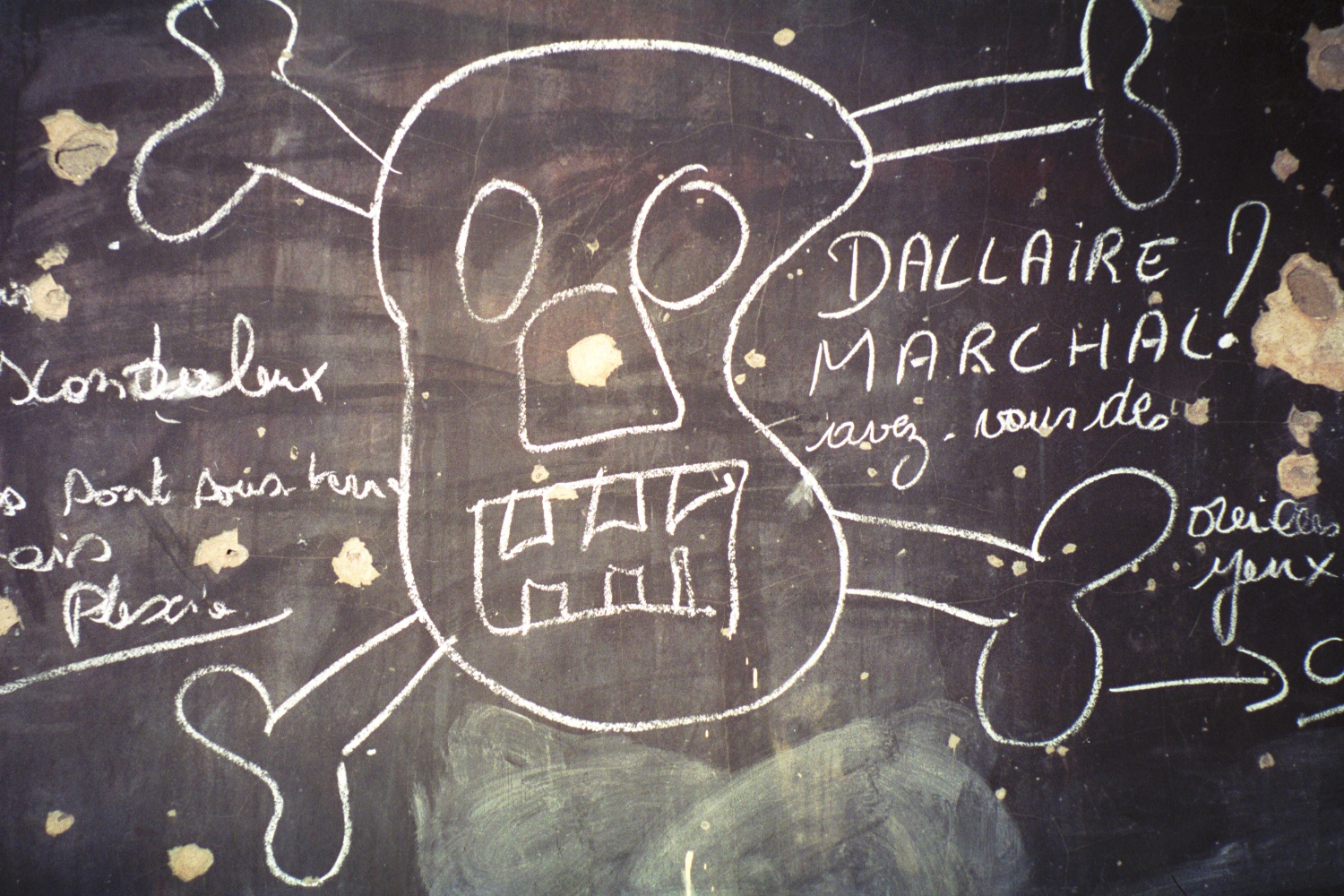
A chalkboard at Camp Kigali, where ten Belgian soldiers were killed at the outset of the genocide. Note the names "Dallaire" and "Marchal" on the right of the board - "avez vous des oreilles, yeux?" is French for "do you have ears, eyes?"

== Aftermath ==
Marchal was accused of negligence contributing to the death of the ten Belgian peacekeepers in a court-martial of the Belgian military, but was found not guilty in July 1996. A 2007 inquiry by the Belgian Senate noted that Marchal and Dallaire were the targets of attempts to turn attention away from errors of judgment made by the Belgian government. Ten years later, Marchal testified in the Belgian trial of former FAR Major Bernard Ntuyahaga, who was found guilty of the murder of the Belgians, and sentenced to twenty years' imprisonment in July 2007.

== Publications ==
- Marchal, Luc (2001). Rwanda: la descente aux enfers. Témoignage d'un peacekeeper: Décembre 1993-Avril 1994. Paris: Éditions Labor. ISBN 978-2-8040-1632-6. (in French)
