= Shiv Kumar =

Shiv Kumar may refer to:

- Shiv K. Kumar (1921–2017), Indian writer in English
- Shiv Kumar Batalvi (1936–1973), Indian poet in Punjabi-language

== See also ==
- Shiva Kumar (disambiguation)
