= Bernard Ntuyahaga =

Convicted Rwandan Army Officer

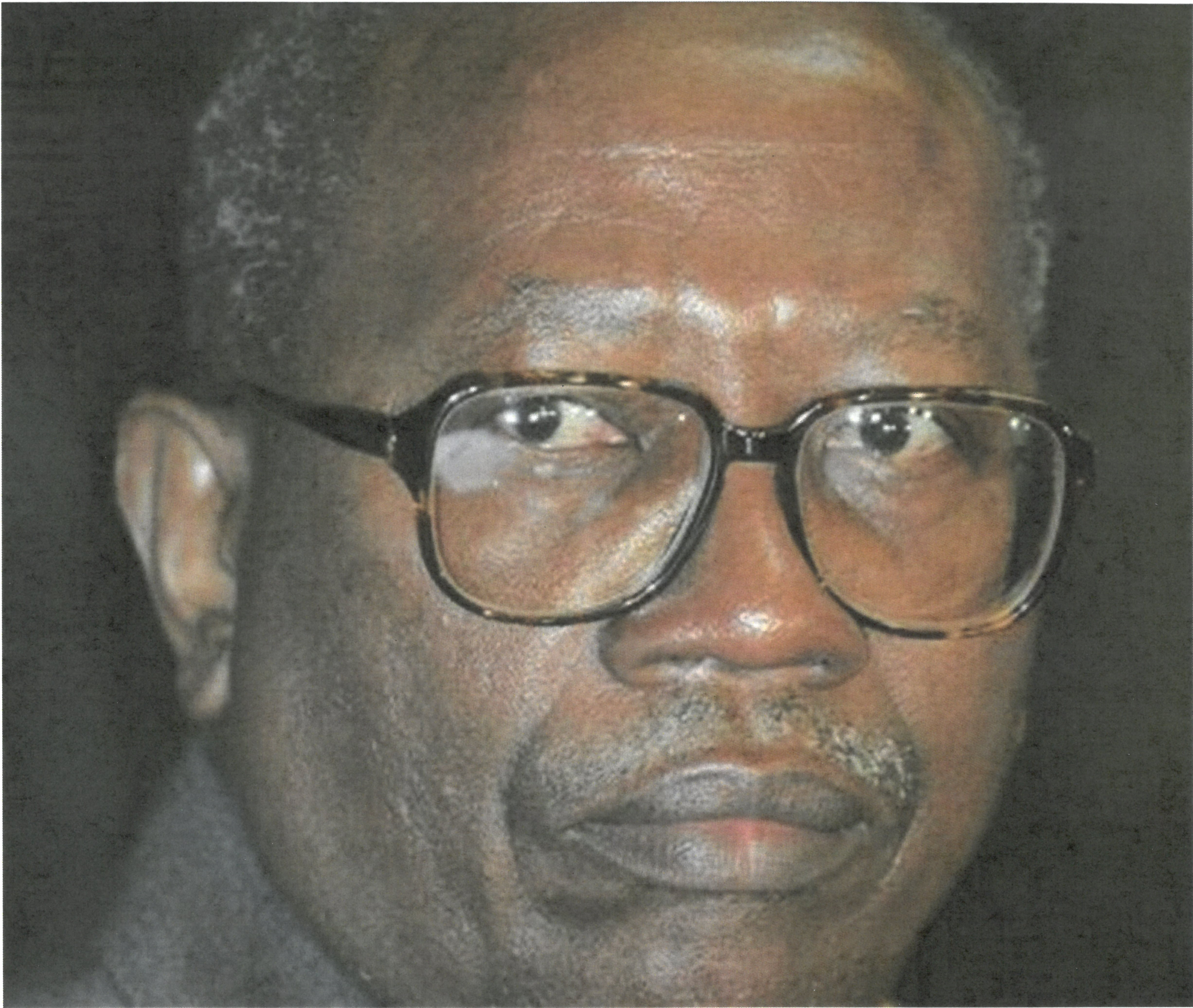
- Ntuyahaga during his trial for murder
- Born: c. 1952 (age 73–74); Mabanza, Kibuye, Ruanda-Urundi
- Military career
- Allegiance: Rwandan Armed Forces
- Rank: Major
- Criminal information
- Criminal charge: Murder
- Penalty: 20 years (released 2018)

Major Bernard Ntuyahaga (probably born in 1952) is a Rwandan army officer convicted by a Belgian court for the murders of ten United Nations peacekeepers at the start of the Rwandan Genocide. He was released in 2018 and returned against his will to Rwanda.

== Military career ==
Bernard Ntuyahaga was born in Mabanza, Kibuye Prefecture in the Belgian mandate of Ruanda-Urundi (modern-day Rwanda). He was an ethnic Hutu. In 1972, he went to the army officer's school in Kigali. At the time of the Rwandan genocide in 1994, he held the rank of major in the Rwandan Armed Forces.

On 7 April 1994, the day after the assassinations of the presidents of Rwanda and Burundi, the house of Prime Minister Agathe Uwilingiyimana, which was under the protection of fifteen peacekeepers under the United Nations Assistance Mission for Rwanda (UNAMIR), was surrounded by soldiers of the Rwandan Armed Forces. After the five Ghanaian and ten Belgian peacekeepers were disarmed, the Ghanaians were released and Madame Agathe and her husband were murdered. The murders were carried out in front of Ntuyahaga and other soldiers.

A Belgian court later found that Ntuyahaga had transported the ten Belgian prisoners, all members of the 2nd Commando Battalion, to the military camp in Kigali where they were subsequently killed by fellow Rwandan soldiers. He was further found to have murdered an undetermined number of Rwandan civilians during the genocide and sentenced to twenty years in prison.

== Legal process ==
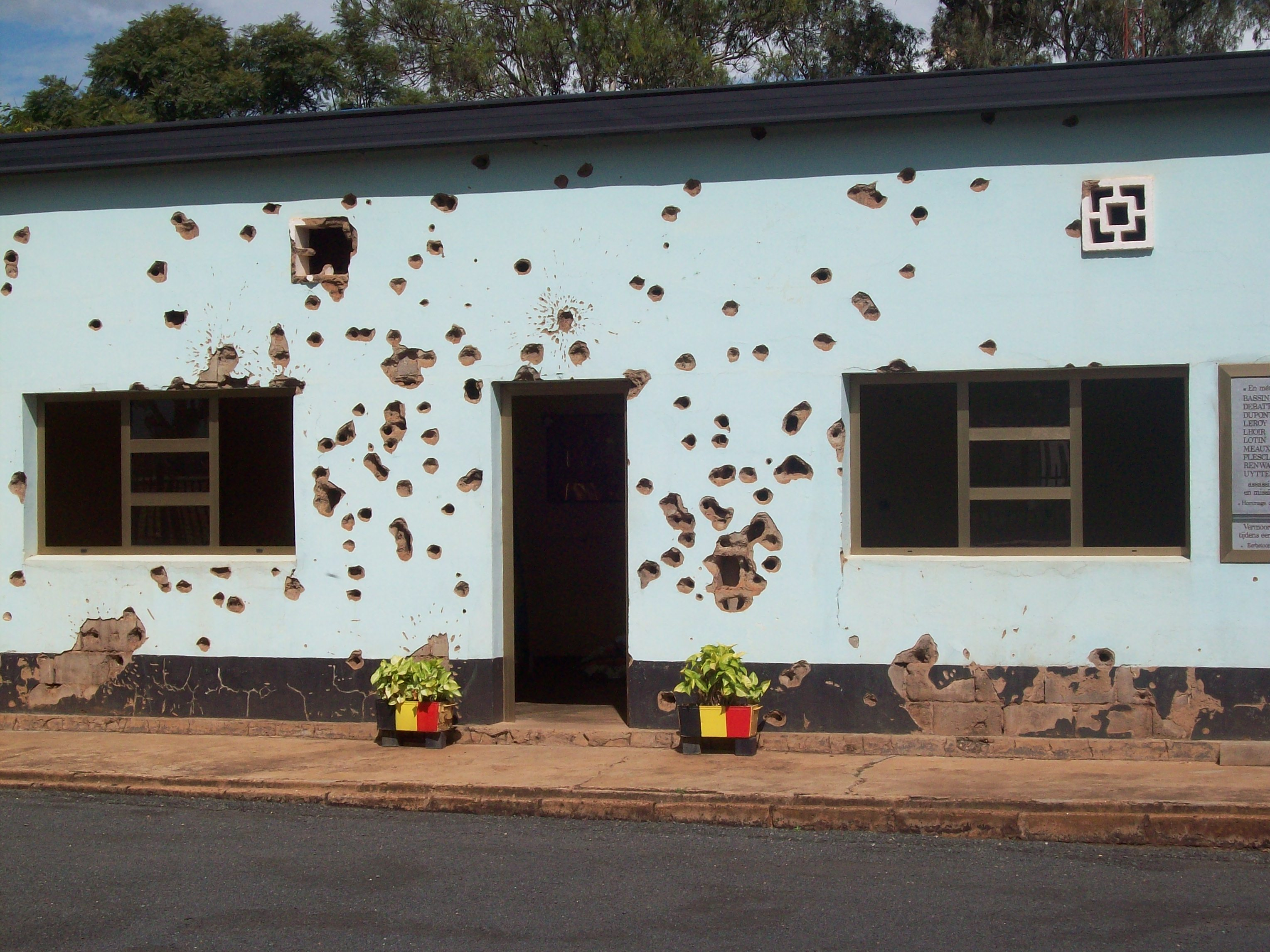
Site of the massacre of Belgian peacekeepers in Kigali, Rwanda

In June 1998, Ntuyahaga surrendered himself to the International Criminal Tribunal for Rwanda (ICTR) in Arusha, Tanzania. In September of that year, the ICTR issued an indictment charging him with: conspiracy to commit genocide; genocide or complicity in genocide; war crimes; and two counts of crimes against humanity. Ntuyahaga pleaded not guilty.

However, on 18 March 1999 the ICTR dropped its charges. In the face of public outcry and official outrage from the Rwandan Patriotic Front government of Rwanda, deputy prosecutor Bernard Muna explained that the ICTR counts only carried a moderate prison sentence and that they hoped Tanzania would extradite Ntuyahaga to Belgium, which could hold a trial over the murders of the peacekeepers. However, Rwanda stated that Ntuyahaga should be extradited to Rwanda, which would try him over the murder of the prime minister. On the same day as the ICTR dropped its charges, Tanzanian authorities arrested Ntuyahaga for entering the country illegally. The following years saw a complicated set of legal procedures, including an application by Ntuyahaga for asylum as a refugee in Tanzania and Tanzania adjusting its charges against Ntuyahaga to fall under its extradition treaty with Rwanda.

This eventually ended when Tanzania denied Rwanda's request for extradition in favor of Belgium. In March 2004, Ntuyahaga, of his own free will, flew to Belgium, accompanied by a Belgian diplomat. There, he gave himself up and was put in prison on remand. He was charged with:

Handing over the Belgian soldiers to the Rwandan soldiers in the Kigali military camp of which he was an officer, without taking any measures to prevent their massacre; of celebrating with the soldiers implicated in the massacres of the Kigali Tutsi civilian population, and of allowing these soldiers to use his residence as the headquarters.

On 7 September 2006, the trial chamber referred the case to the Assize Court. The trial began on 19 April 2007. On 4 July 2007, the court came back with the verdict of guilty in the murder of the peacekeepers and an unknown number of Rwandan civilians. He was found not guilty in the murder of the prime minister and the killing of an unknown number of civilians in Butare. The public prosecutor asked for life imprisonment, but the following day the jury sentenced Ntuyahaga to twenty years' imprisonment. Defense lawyer Luc de Temmerman stated that they would most likely not appeal. The reason for this is that convicts may ask for conditional release after serving a third of their sentence. Judges may take part of the time served in jail in Tanzania and Rwanda into account, meaning that Ntuyahaga may spend only a few years in jail. He eventually did appeal to the Belgian supreme court, the Court of Cassation. The supreme court dismissed his appeal, and he was ordered to pay €6,101,306 in damages to the families of the ten murdered peacekeepers. He was also required to pay €575,070 in damages to the families of the Rwandan civilians murdered under his command.

In December 2018, Ntuyahaga was extradited to Rwanda.

== Notes and references ==
=== Further reading ===
- Guichaoua, André (2005). Rwanda 1994: les politiques du génocide à Butare. Paris: Éd. Karthala. ISBN 2-84586-669-0.
