= Tanyigbe =

- Country: Ghana
- Region: Volta Region
- District: Ho Municipal District
- Time zone: GMT
  - Summer (DST): GMT

Tanyigbe is a town in the Ho municipality of the Volta Region of Ghana. The town is known for the Tanyigbe Secondary School, a well known second cycle institution in the town.

== History ==
The people of Tanyigbe settled in the East of Ho, the Volta Regional capital.

The town was ruled by Togbega Kwasi Adiko V for 64 years until 2015 when he died at the age of 88 years. He was enstooled as the paramount chief at age 25, under his 64 years reign as the paramount chief of the land, he was able to build a new four-classroom Senior High School, a Junior High School, a clinic, established a Postal Agency and Telecommunication Service in 1952 and 1957 respectively and ensured the extension of electricity to the traditional area. Togbega Kwasi Adiko V was a trained Teacher, worked at the State Insurance Company and the National Commission on Children. Togbega Kwasi Adiko V was succeeded by his son, Roland Kofi Adiko enstooled under the stool name Togbega Kodi Adiko VI.

Togbega Kodi Adiko VI was enstooled at age 51, before, he was a pharmacist and chief executive officer of Rodina Chemist Limited.

== Festival ==
One of the major attractions to the town is the Yam Festival, indigenously called “Tegadudu” in the Ewe language.

== Education ==
Tanyigbe Senior High School is the only senior high school in the area. Even though there are several primary schools in the town there is not yet a tertiary institution to be boasted of.
