= Jennifer Allen Simons =

Australian anti–nuclear activist

Jennifer Allen Simons (born c. 1939) is an Australian anti–nuclear weapons activist and educator. She is founder and president of The Simons Foundation Canada and principal sponsor of Global Zero (campaign).

== Education ==
Simons has a doctorate from Simon Fraser University. She is an adjunct professor at the SFU School for International Studies.

== Philanthropy ==
Simons also advocates against landmines and cluster bombs. Her other philanthropy includes dance companies, classical music, and art galleries.

She has a husband Tom and 4 children.

== Awards ==
- Queen's Golden Jubilee Medal (2002)
- Order of Canada (2010)
- Queen Elizabeth II Diamond Jubilee Medal (2012)
