= Shiva Kumar (general) =

Lieutenant General Siva Kumar, AVSM VSM (born January 29, 1948, in Madras, India) is an Indian former commander. He was the third and final Force commander of UN troops serving in Rwanda.

== Biography ==
Kumar was born in Madras, India. As a youth, he attended St. Thomas High School, Loyola College and Presidency College where he earned a Bachelor of Science. He is a graduate of the staff course at the Defence Services Staff College and has attended both Higher Command and National Defence College.

In August 1967, Kumar was commissioned from Officers Training Academy at the age of 19. He joined the Jat Regiment on June 23, 1968, and later commanded the regiment in Arunachal Pradesh and Bikaner, Rajasthan. He also commanded a division of the Assam Rifles in the Ukhrul district of Northeastern Manipur.

He has been awarded the Vishisht Seva Medal and the Ati Vishisht Seva Medal.

== UNAMIR Service ==
Kumar acted as second-in-command of UNAMIR until Major General Guy Tousignant of Canada's parting on December 8, 1995, when he assumed acting command until the mission's completion in March 1996. He oversaw 1,252 troops and military support personnel, 146 military observers, 56 United Nations Volunteers and approximately 160 international and 160 local civilian staff. The Indian army contingent under UNAMIR consisted of an Infantry Battalion 1/3 Gurkha Rifles, an Engineers company commanded by Maj B Pandey and a Signals company commanded by Maj AV Malhotra. Kumar was also the head of the Indian contingent.

In March, Kumar left Rwanda and flew to Nairobi, Kenya, with five bodyguards, stating to the media present, "We did a good job here under very difficult circumstances. I am proud of what the troops achieved."

== After Rwanda ==
In the autumn of 1998, he presented a scholastic paper entitled "The Role of Non-governmental Organizations (NGO), the Civil Society Living in the Area of the Peacekeeping Operations, and the Media in United Nations Peacekeeping Operations" at the first South Asian Peacekeeping Experience Seminar in Bangladesh.

In April 2004, he was posted as Chief Army Instructor at the Defence Services Staff College.

On July 1, 2006, took over as Chief of Staff for India's Eastern Command. He retired from this appointment on January 31, 2008.

| Preceded by Major-General Guy Tousignant (Canada) | Force Commander of UNAMIR; December 8, 1995 – March 8, 1996 | Succeeded by Mission ended |
