= Guy Tousignant =

Canadian general

- Born: 1941 (age 84–85); Sherbrooke, Quebec, Canada
- Military career
- Allegiance: Canada
- Branch: Canadian Army
- Service years: 1962–1996
- Rank: Major-General
- Commands: United Nations Assistance Mission for Rwanda; CFB Borden
- Awards: Officer of the Order of Military Merit; Meritorious Service Cross; Canadian Forces' Decoration

Major-General Guy Claude Tousignant, OMM, MSC, CD (born 1941) is a retired senior officer of the Canadian Army.

Born in Sherbrooke, Quebec, Tousignant received a Bachelor of Arts degree from the Université de Sherbrooke in 1962. He was commissioned with the Canadian Officers' Training Corps in 1962. He was promoted to major in 1973, lieutenant-colonel in 1979, colonel in 1983, and brigadier-general in 1990. He was made an Officer of the Order of Military Merit in 1983. In 1990, he was appointed base commander of CFB Borden. After being promoted to major-general in 1993, he was appointed the Commandant of the National Defence College.

Tousignant replaced Roméo Dallaire as Force Commander of United Nations Assistance Mission for Rwanda (UNAMIR) in August 1994 and also served as assistant Secretary-General of that mission. He departed Rwanda on December 8, 1995, leaving the mission in the charge of his second-in-command, Brigadier-General Shiva Kumar of India. UNAMIR ended in March 1996.

Tousignant was previously the Secretary General of CARE International Secretariat. The Secretariat, located in Brussels, Belgium, is the central hub of the CARE family, coordinating the efforts of 13 member nations around the world.

Military offices
Preceded by Lieutenant-General Roméo Dallaire (Canada)	Force Commander of UNAMIR; 1994–1995	Succeeded by Brigadier-General Shiva Kumar (India)
