= Mabanza =

Ndzie is a Congolese surname. Notable people with the surname include:

- Loic Mabanza (born 1990), French actor, dancer, filmmaker, choreographer and model
- Vancy Mabanza (born 2000), Burundian footballer
