= Shake Hands with the Devil (book) =

2003 book by Roméo Dallaire

- First edition
- Author: Roméo Dallaire
- Cover artist: CS Richardson
- Language: English, French
- Publisher: Random House Canada
- Publication date: September 2003
- Publication place: Canada
- Pages: 562
- ISBN: 978-0-679-31171-3
- OCLC: 50022773
- LC Class: DT450.435 .D35 2003

Shake Hands with the Devil: The Failure of Humanity in Rwanda is a book by Lieutenant-General Roméo Dallaire of the Canadian Forces, with help from Major Brent Beardsley. It was first published by Random House Canada in September 2003.

The book chronicles Dallaire's tour as Force Commander of the United Nations Assistance Mission for Rwanda (UNAMIR) in 1993–1994, during which he witnessed the 1994 Genocide Against Tutsi.

The book won the 2003 Shaughnessy Cohen Award for Political Writing, and 2004 Governor General's Award for nonfiction.

The documentary film Shake Hands with the Devil: The Journey of Roméo Dallaire (2004) and a 2007 dramatic feature film are inspired by and in part based on the book. Dallaire was consulted in the making of both films.

== Summary ==
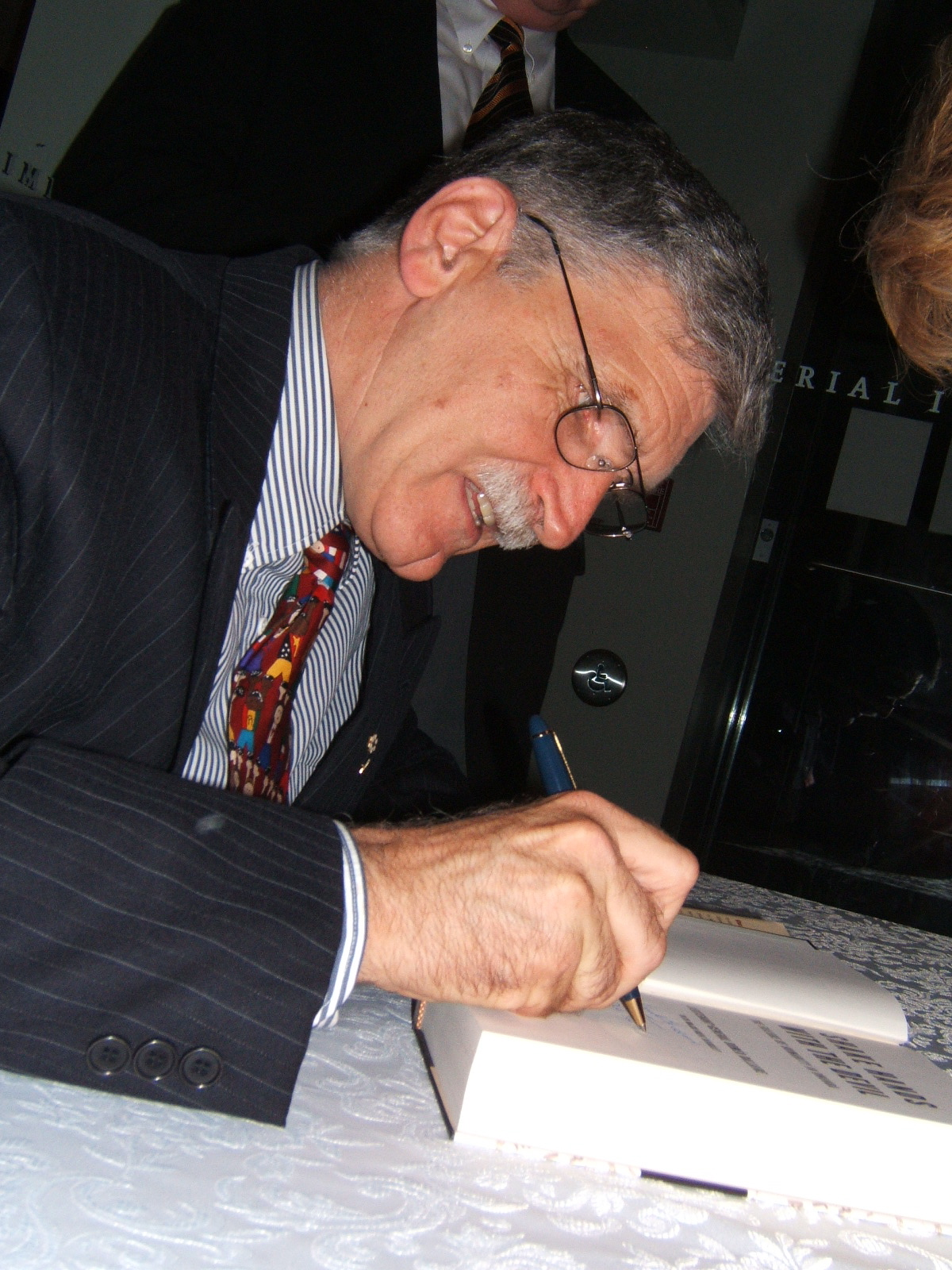
Roméo Dallaire signing Shake Hands with the Devil

More than 800,000 people are believed to have been killed in 100 days in the 1994 genocide in Rwanda. Lt. Gen. Roméo Dallaire witnessed these massacres. In Shake Hands with the Devil, he describes the dilemmas and atrocities to which he was exposed.

In the book Dallaire explains how, after arriving in Kigali in August 1993, he warned the UN high authorities that he lacked sufficient equipment and manpower to carry out his mission. However, a lack of clarity in the UN's intervention procedures coupled with the international community's apparent lack of interest in Rwanda meant that Dallaire's calls for help went unanswered.

From day to day the situation deteriorates until eventually the general's forces are left on their own, without fuel, money or adequate equipment. Meanwhile, encouraged by the ethnic hate propaganda of the Radio Télévision Libre des Mille Collines (RTLM), Hutu militiamen attack their Tutsi victims while an army of exiles begins a civil war, from the northern border of the country, to take power. In Kigali, corpses of civilians killed by machetes begin piling up and many of the moderate politicians with whom Dallaire had the mandate to negotiate are also murdered.

Awards
Preceded by Paris 1919: Six Months That Changed the World	Governor General's Award for English language non-fiction recipient 2004	Succeeded by The Golden Spruce: A True Story of Myth, Madness and Greed
