= United Nations Assistance Mission for Rwanda =

1993 peacekeeping mission

- Abbreviation: UNAMIR
- Formation: 5 October 1993
- Type: Peacekeeping mission
- Legal status: Completed
- Head of Mission: (Cameroon) Jacques-Roger Booh-Booh (October 1993 – July 1994) (Pakistan) Shahryar Khan (July 1994 – March 1996)
- Force Commander: (Canada) Roméo Dallaire (October 1993 – September 1994) (Canada) Guy Tousignant (September 1994 – December 1994) (India) Shiva Kumar (December 1994 – March 1996)
- Parent organization: United Nations Security Council

The United Nations Assistance Mission for Rwanda (UNAMIR) was established by United Nations Security Council Resolution 872 on 5 October 1993. It was intended to assist in the implementation of the Arusha Accords, signed on 4 August 1993, which was meant to end the Rwandan Civil War. The mission lasted from October 1993 to March 1996. Its activities were meant to aid the peace process between the Hutu-dominated Rwandese government and the Tutsi-dominated rebel Rwandan Patriotic Front (RPF). The UNAMIR has received much attention for its role in failing, due to the limitations of its rules of engagement, to prevent the Rwandan genocide and outbreak of fighting. Its mandate extended past the RPF overthrow of the government and into the Great Lakes refugee crisis. The mission is thus regarded as a major failure.

== Background ==
In October 1990 the Rwandan Civil War began when the Rwandan Patriotic Front rebel group invaded across Uganda's southern border into northern Rwanda. The RPF was composed of over 4,000 soldiers, mostly the children of Tutsi refugees who had fled anti-Tutsi purges in Rwanda between 1959 and 1963. It portrayed itself as a democratic, multi-ethnic movement and demanded an end to ethnic discrimination, to economic looting of the country by government elites and a stop to the security situation that continued to generate refugees. It was supported by the Ugandan government of Yoweri Museveni, who had come to power in the Ugandan Bush War with significant support from the Rwandan refugees in the country. However, the Rwandan Armed Forces (FAR) was saved by reinforcements from France and Zaire, who backed the government of Rwandan President Juvénal Habyarimana, who had been in power since 1973.

The French intervention of two parachute companies, explained as an attempt to protect its own nationals, actually blocked the RPF advance on the capital Kigali. In contrast, the government of Belgium, the former colonial power, cut all support to the Habyarimana regime, which viewed the action as abandonment. Thwarted by the French, the RPF suffered a humiliating retreat back into the Virunga Mountains along the border. After the demoralising death of Major-General Fred Rwigyema, the collapse of the RPF was prevented through the leadership of Paul Kagame.

The RPF thus managed to retain control of a sliver of land in the north, from which it continued to launch raids. Comparing the RPF and FAR as he saw them in 1993, Canadian Lieutenant-General Roméo Dallaire noted that the rebels "had won all recent contests because of their superior leadership, training, experience, frugality, mobility, discipline and morale."

However, the RPF invasion, which displaced approximately 600,000 people into crowded internally displaced person camps, also radicalised the Hutu populace. The Tutsi civilians in Rwanda, roughly 14% of the population, were labelled ibyitso ("accomplices") or inyenzi ("cockroaches"), who were accused of secretly aiding the RPF invaders. Anti-Tutsi propaganda was spread through the publication Kangura, a forerunner to the Radio Télévision Libre des Mille Collines, which was created immediately after the invasion. The first plans for mass murder of Tutsi were also developed toward the end of 1990, mostly in a series of secret meetings in Gisenyi prefecture of the Akazu, a network of associates based around Agathe Habyarimana, the First Lady.

A number of ceasefire agreements were signed by the RPF and government, including one signed on 22 July 1992 in Arusha, Tanzania that resulted in the Organization of African Unity (OAU) establishing a 50-member Neutral Military Observer Group (NMOG I) led by Nigerian General Ekundayo Opaleye. The negotiations for a peace settlement continued in Arusha, interrupted by a massive RPF offensive in early February 1993. Rwanda continued to allege Ugandan support for the RPF, which both the RPF and Uganda duly denied, but resulting in both countries sending letters to President of the United Nations Security Council (UNSC) requesting that military observers be deployed along the border to verify that military supplies were not crossing.

This resulted in the United Nations Observer Mission Uganda–Rwanda (UNOMUR) being approved by the UNSC on 22 June 1993 to deploy along the Ugandan side of the border. Seven days later, UN Secretary-General Boutros Boutros-Ghali announced that Brigadier-General Dallaire was to be appointed the Chief Military Observer for UNOMUR, which reached its authorised strength of 81 observers by September. NMOG I was deployed inside Rwanda.

In the meantime, talks in Arusha had reconvened on 16 March 1993, resulting in the signing of the Arusha Accords, a comprehensive agreement to create a power-sharing government, on the fourth of August. Both the RPF and Rwandan government requested UN assistance in implementing the agreement. In early August, NMOG I was replaced by NMOG II, consisting of about 130 members, in preparation for a UN-led peacekeeping force.

== Establishment ==
=== Mandate ===
UNAMIR mandate was:

(a) To contribute to the security of the city of Kigali inter alia with in a weapons-secure area established by the parties in and around the city;
(b) To monitor observance of the cease-fire agreement, which calls for the establishment of cantonment and assembly zones and the demarcation of the new demilitarised zone and other demilitarisation procedures;
(c) To monitor the security situation during the final period of the transitional government’s mandate, leading up to the elections;
(d) To assist with mine clearance, primarily through training programmes;
(e) To investigate at the request of the parties or on its own initiative instances of alleged non-compliance with the provisions of the Arusha Peace Agreement relating to the integration of the armed forces, and pursue any such instances with the parties responsible and report thereon as appropriate to the Secretary-General;
(f) To monitor the process of repatriation of Rwandese refugees and resettlement of displaced persons to verify that it is carried out in a safe and orderly manner;
(g) To assist in the coordination of humanitarian assistance activities in conjunction with relief operations;
(h) To investigate and report on incidents regarding the activities of the gendarmerie and police.

Its authorised strength was 2,500 personnel, but it took some five months of piecemeal commitments for the mission to reach this level.

On 5 April 1994, the UN voted to extend the mandate of UNAMIR to 29 July 1994, after expressing "deep concern at the delay in the establishment of the broad-based transitional Government and the Transitional National Assembly" and "concern at the deterioration in security in the country, particularly in Kigali."

On 21 April 1994, the Security Council voted to reduce the number of troops from 2,500 to 270 personnel in Resolution 912.

On 17 May 1994, the Security Council passed Resolution 918, which expanded UNAMIR’s mandate to include the following additional responsibilities: "(a) To contribute to the security and protection of displaced persons, refugees and civilians at risk in Rwanda, including through the establishment and maintenance, where feasible, of secure humanitarian areas; (b) To provide security and support for the distribution of relief supplies and humanitarian relief operations".

=== Composition of UNAMIR ===
The Special Representative of the Secretary-General (SRSG) or head of the mission, was Jacques-Roger Booh-Booh of Cameroon. At the beginning of July 1994, Booh-Booh was replaced by Shahryar Khan of Pakistan. The military head and Force Commander was Canadian Brigadier-General (promoted Major-General during the mission) Roméo Dallaire. In August 1994, Dallaire, suffering from severe stress, was replaced as Force Commander by Major-General Guy Tousignant, also from Canada. In December 1995, Tousignant was replaced by Brigadier General Shiva Kumar from India. The Deputy Force Commander was Brigadier-General (promoted Major-General after the mission) Henry Kwami Anyidoho from Ghana.

Troop contributing countries were Belgium, Bangladesh, Ghana, and Tunisia. Around 400 of the troops in this early part of the mission were Belgian soldiers, despite the fact that Rwanda had been a Belgian colony, and normally the UN bans the former colonial power from serving in such peace-keeping roles.

Squabbling between interested parties delayed the UNAMIR goal of assisting the formation of the transitional government following the inauguration of President Habyarimana on 5 January 1994. The violent clashes that followed, including the assassinations of two major political leaders and the ambush of a UNAMIR-led convoy of RPF forces led the UNAMIR forces to move to a more defensive footing. UNAMIR thus contributed support to the military and civilian authorities in Rwanda, while the UN continued to place pressure on Habyarimana and the RPF to return to the ideas set forth in the Accords.

== Operations before the genocide ==
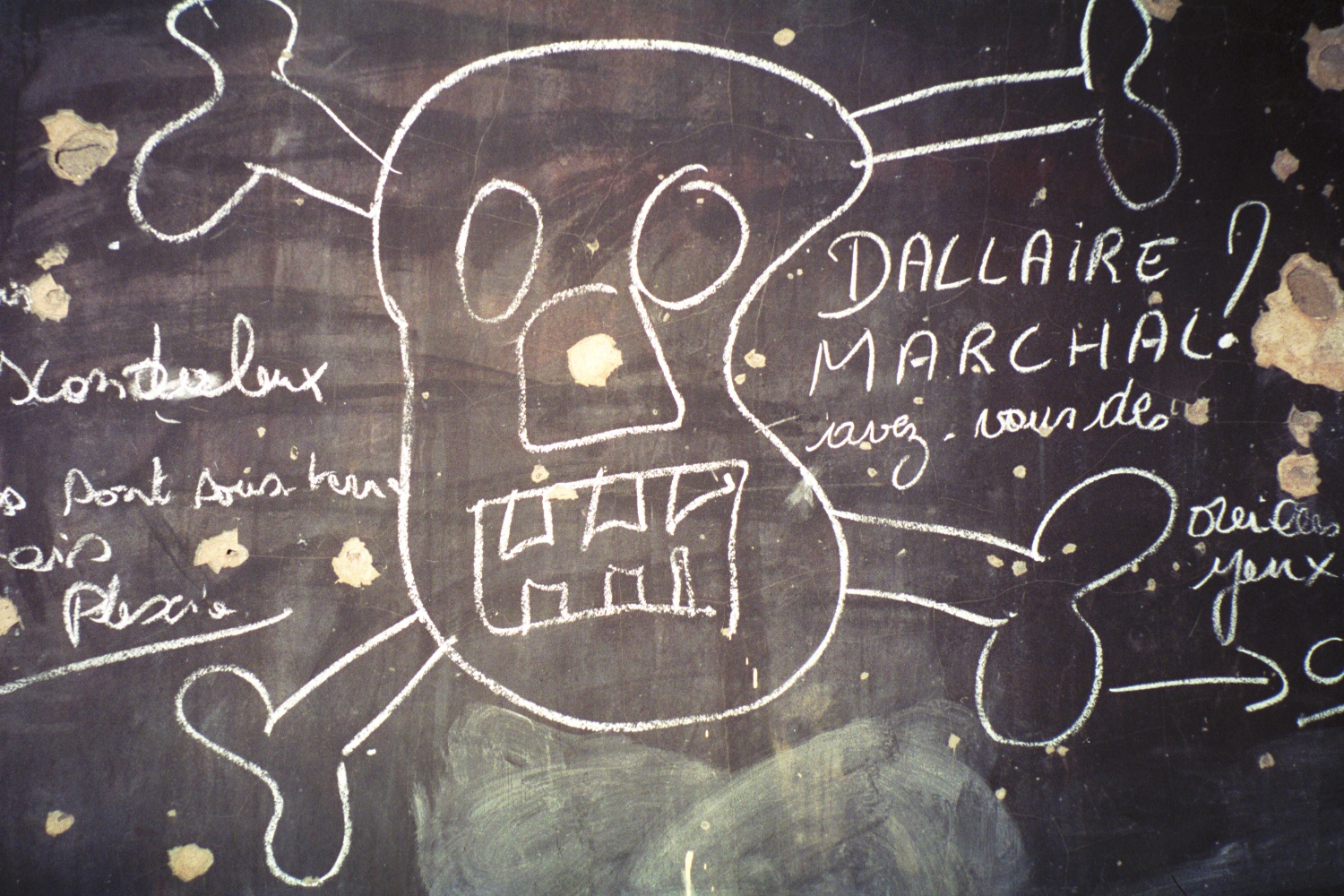
A military building chalkboard in Kigali. Note the names "Dallaire", UNAMIR Force Commander, and "Marchal", UNAMIR Kigali sector commander.

The United Nations Assistance Mission for Rwanda (UNAMIR) had been in Rwanda since October 1993, with a mandate to oversee the implementation of the Arusha Accords. UNAMIR commander Dallaire learned of the Hutu Power movement during the early phase of deployment; in January 1994, a government informant alerted Dallaire to a group who were rapidly arming militias and planning mass extermination of Tutsi, and led UNAMIR to a secret arms cache. Dallaire sent a cable to the UN Department of Peacekeeping Operations (DPKO) in New York, requesting permission to raid the weapons caches; the UN refused Dallaire's request to raid the arms, and rebuked him for exceeding his mandate. Dallaire's cable also informed the DPKO of the information concerning the genocide; it said: "Since UNAMIR mandate [the informant] has been ordered to register all Tutsi in Kigali. He suspects it is for their extermination. Example he gave was that in 20 minutes his personnel could kill up to 1000 Tutsis." Dallaire received little support from the administrative head of UNAMIR, Cameroonian Jacques-Roger Booh-Booh; the RPF accused Booh-Booh of partiality towards President Habyarimana and the Hutu elite. UNAMIR operated with very limited resources, and its efforts to install the transitional government were obstructed by President Habyarimana and the hardliners throughout early 1994. By April, the Security Council threatened to terminate UNAMIR's mandate if it did not make progress.

== Genocide ==
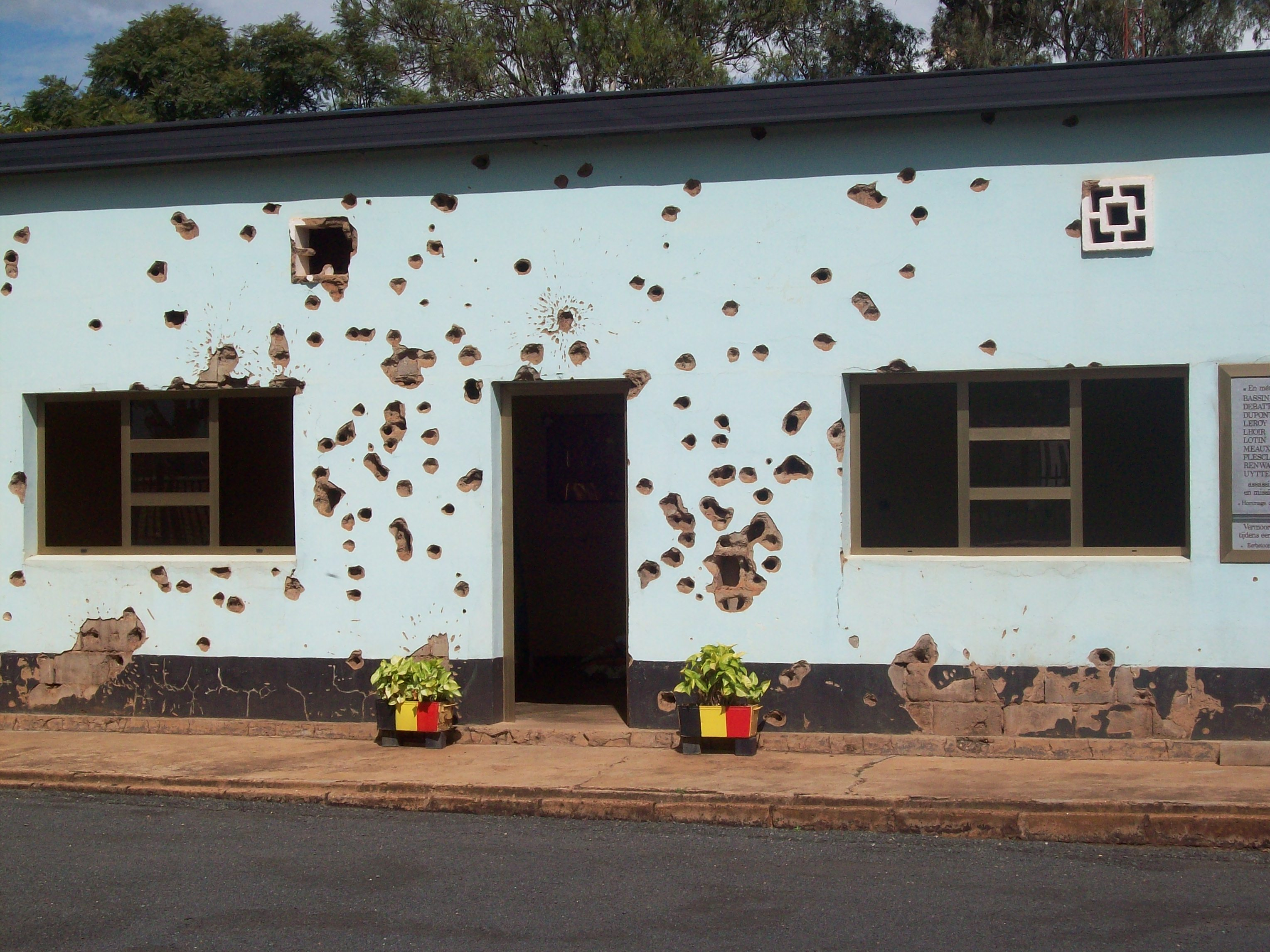
Memorial for the dead Belgian UNAMIR personnel in Kigali

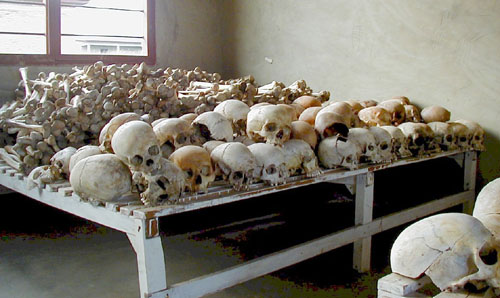
Skulls in Murambi Technical School

On 6 April 1994, a plane carrying President Habyarimana and President Cyprien Ntaryamira of Burundi was shot down near Kigali. What followed was the collapse of the unstable peace in Rwanda and the Rwandan genocide, estimated to have claimed between 800,000 and 1,017,100 victims over 100 days, the vast majority being Tutsis.

Among the first targets of the genocide were Prime Minister Agathe Uwilingiyimana and ten Belgian members of 2nd Commando Battalion, the Paracommando Regiment operating as part of UNAMIR. These troops were murdered after handing over their weapons to Rwandan government troops. They were advised to do so by their battalion commander who was unclear on the legal issues with authorising them to defend themselves, even though they had already been under fire for approximately two hours.

Following the death of Habyarimana, Dallaire liaised repeatedly with both the Crisis Committee and the RPF, in an attempt to re-establish peace. He addressed the government forces during the night of 6 April, expressing regret at Habyarimana's death but urging them to restrain the killings that had commenced; he also urged Kagame not to resume the civil war, to avoid escalating the violence and to give UNAMIR a chance to rein in the killings. Neither side was interested in a ceasefire, the government because it was controlled by the génocidaires, and the RPF because it considered it necessary to fight to stop the killings. UNAMIR's Chapter VI mandate rendered it powerless to intervene militarily, and most of its Rwandan staff were killed in the early days of the genocide, severely limiting its ability to operate. UNAMIR was therefore largely reduced to a bystander role, and Dallaire later labelled it a "failure". Its most significant contribution was to provide refuge for thousands of Tutsi and moderate Hutu at its headquarters in Amahoro Stadium, as well as other secure UN sites. UNAMIR also assisted with the evacuation of foreign nationals; a group of Belgian soldiers, who had been sheltering 2,000 Rwandans at the École Technique Officielle, were ordered to abandon their station to assist in the evacuation. After the Belgians left, Hutu militants entered and massacred everyone inside.

On 12 April, the Belgian government, which was one of the largest troop contributors to UNAMIR, and had lost ten soldiers protecting Prime Minister Uwilingiliyimana, announced that it was withdrawing. Belgium also favoured a complete withdrawal of UNAMIR, and lobbied for this in the UN. Dallaire protested, arguing that the force should be strengthened and given a new mandate to protect the thousands of refugees it was protecting, but the UN Security Council refused, telling Dallaire that UNAMIR would be effectively withdrawn unless the belligerents agreed to a ceasefire by early May. According to Philip Gourevitch, the United States, having recently suffered losses in the UN mission in Somalia, was particularly keen to "get out of Rwanda" and "leave it to its fate". New Zealand, which held the rotating presidency of the UN Security Council, was the lone voice supporting reinforcement, and in late April, persuaded the council to postpone UNAMIR's withdrawal, despite continuing reluctance from the United States and United Kingdom.

Though understaffed and abandoned, members of the UNAMIR forces did manage to save the lives of thousands of Tutsis in and around Kigali and the few areas of UN control. Dallaire requested the immediate insertion of approximately 5,000 troops, but his request was denied.

=== UNAMIR II ===
For the next six weeks, approximately, UNAMIR coordinated peace talks between the Hutu government and the RPF to little avail. Eventually, on 17 May 1994, the UN agreed to reinforcement, that would deliver nearly 5,500 troops and much needed personnel carriers and other equipment to UNAMIR, which would be henceforth known as UNAMIR II. The new soldiers did not start arriving until June, and following the end of the genocide in July, the role of UNAMIR II was largely confined to maintaining security and stability. UNAMIR withdrew from Rwanda in 1996, following the withdrawal of support by the RPF-led government.

UNAMIR II and subsequent resolutions were still unclear on the right to use force in stopping the genocide. In one of Dallaire's parting cables, he said that "the [UN] force has been prevented from having a modicum of self-respect and effectiveness on the ground". Unfortunately, in the face of the mayhem in Rwanda and this diplomatic watering down of UNAMIR's mandate, many UN member states delayed contributing personnel for some time, until the main wave of killings ceased.

== After the genocide ==
United Nations Assistance Mission for Rwanda Medal
- Obverse and ribbon of the medal
- Type: Campaign medal
- Awarded for: 90 days' service to the Mission
- Eligibility: United Nations forces.
- Campaigns: Rwandan Civil War, Rwandan genocide, Great Lakes refugee crisis
- Clasps: None
- Established: December 1993
- Website: https://peacekeeping.un.org/sites/default/files/past/unamir.htm

In July 1994, the RPF swept into Kigali and ended the genocide that had lasted 100 days, and its leader Paul Kagame (who became president several years later-but effectively controlled the country from July 1994 through the present) reaffirmed his commitment to the Arusha Accords.

Following the end of the main killings, the challenges for UNAMIR (and the many NGOs who arrived in the country) were to maintain the fragile peace, stabilise the government and, most importantly, care for the nearly 4 million displaced people in camps within Rwanda, Zaire, Tanzania, Burundi, and Uganda. The massive camps around Lake Kivu in the northwest of Rwanda were holding about 1.2 million people and this was creating enormous security, health, and ecological problems.

After the late arrival of the much-needed troop support, UNAMIR continued to carry out its mandate to the best of its abilities. In 1996, however, with assertion from the new Rwandese government that UNAMIR had failed in its priority mission, the UN withdrew the UNAMIR mandate on 8 March 1996. Despite the failure of UNAMIR in its main mission, its humanitarian services during the 1994 genocide are recognised to this day as having saved the lives of thousands or tens of thousands of Rwandan Tutsi and Hutu moderates who would have otherwise been killed. However, the actions of the UN in Rwanda (and particularly the Head of Peacekeeping Operations at the time, Kofi Annan) have been used by some as examples of the over-bureaucratic and dithering approach of the UN. (General Dallaire was particularly critical of Annan's performance.)

Countries that contributed troops to UNAMIR throughout its existence were: Argentina, Australia, Austria, Bangladesh, Belgium, Brazil, Canada, Chad, Congo, Djibouti, Egypt, Ethiopia, Fiji, Germany, Ghana, Guinea, Guinea Bissau, Guyana, India, Jordan, Kenya, Malawi, Mali, Netherlands, Niger, Nigeria, Pakistan, Poland, Romania, Russia, Senegal, Slovakia, Spain, Switzerland, Togo, Tunisia, United Kingdom, Uruguay, Zambia and Zimbabwe.

== Casualties ==
Twenty-seven members of UNAMIR – 22 soldiers, three military observers, one civilian police and one local staff – lost their lives during the mission. The genocide and the spectre of mission failure had a profound effect on Dallaire. On his return to Canada he was diagnosed with acute posttraumatic stress disorder (PTSD); he became suicidal. He was eventually released from the Canadian army service on medical grounds. Dallaire received the Aegis Trust Award (the first) for his acts of bravery. In 2004–2005, he was awarded a fellowship at the Carr Center for Human Rights Policy, Harvard University, where he was studying and writing about different forms of conflict resolution. On 25 March 2005, he was appointed a Canadian senator, representing Québec as a member of the Liberal Party of Canada; he serves on the committee for Human Rights. He also speaks publicly about his experiences relating to genocide, PTSD and suicide. While Dallaire's issues have been the focus of much attention, particularly in Canada, very little attention has been paid to the plight of the front line soldiers of the Canadian Contingent to UNAMIR who suffered from a rash of suicides, marital breakdowns and career ending diagnoses of PTSD following their return from Rwanda.

== See also ==
- Criticism of the United Nations
- History of Rwanda
- Mogadishu Line
- Shake Hands With the Devil: The Failure of Humanity in Rwanda

== Sources ==
- Dallaire, Roméo (2005). Shake Hands with the Devil: The Failure of Humanity in Rwanda. London: Arrow Books. ISBN 978-0-09-947893-5. Archived from the original on 1 July 2023.
- Melvern, Linda (2004). Conspiracy to Murder: The Rwandan Genocide. New York: Verso. ISBN 1-85984-588-6.
- Prunier, Gérard (1999). The Rwanda Crisis: History of a Genocide (2nd ed.). Kampala: Fountain Publishers Limited. ISBN 978-9970-02-089-8. Archived from the original on 11 January 2023.
