= United Nations Security Council Resolution 1029 =

UN Security Council Resolution 1029
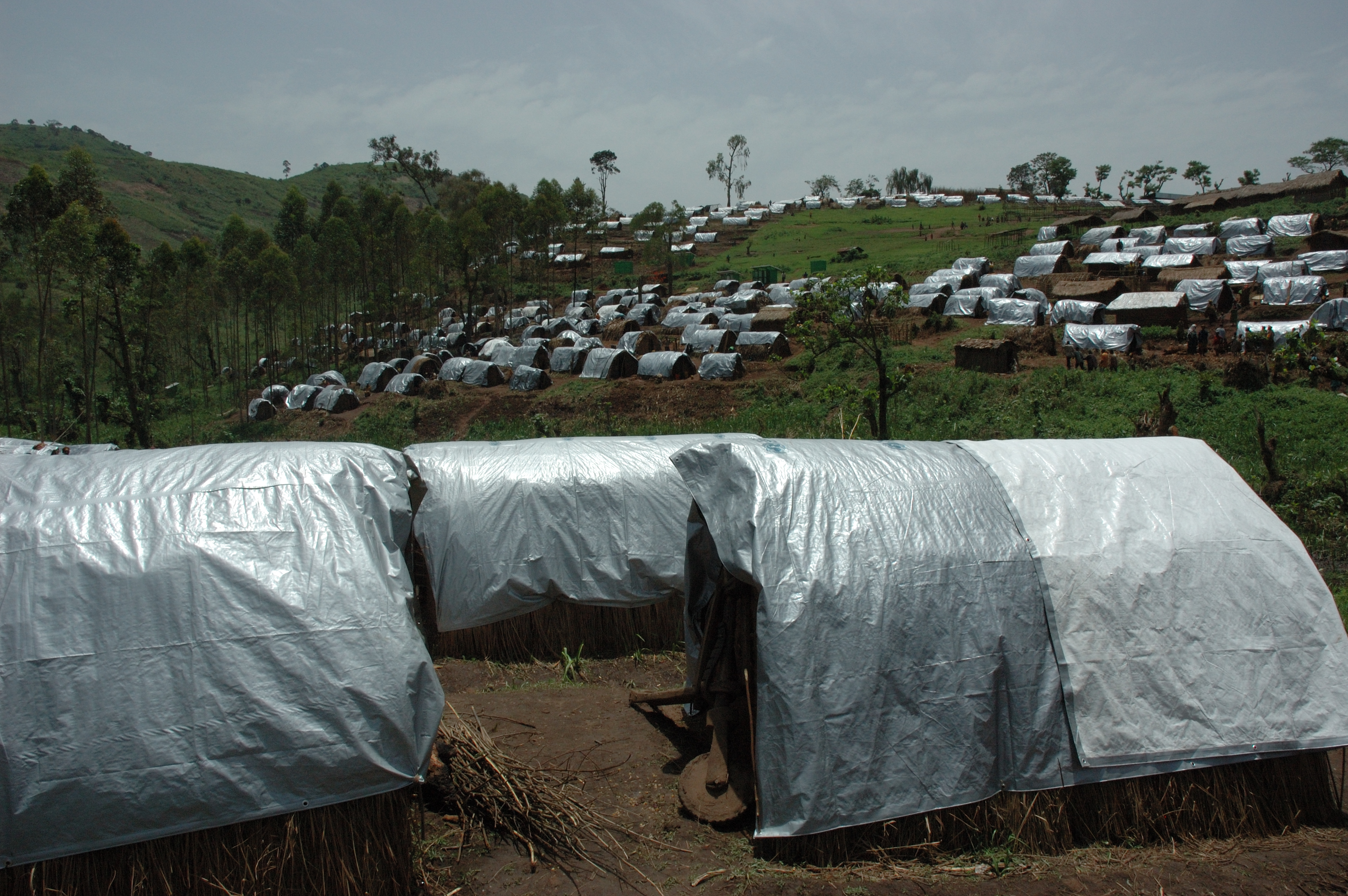
- Rwandan refugee camp in the Democratic Republic of the Congo
- Date: 12 December 1995
- Meeting no.: 3,605
- Code: S/RES/1029 (Document)
- Subject: Rwanda
- Voting summary: 15 voted for; None voted against; None abstained
- Result: Adopted

Security Council composition
- Permanent members: China; France; Russia; United Kingdom; United States
- Non-permanent members: Argentina; Botswana; Czech Republic; Germany; Honduras; Indonesia; Italy; Nigeria; Oman; Rwanda

United Nations Security Council resolution 1029, adopted unanimously on 12 December 1995, after recalling previous resolutions on Rwanda, including Resolution 872 (1993), Resolution 912 (1994), Resolution 918 (1994), Resolution 925 (1994), Resolution 955 (1994), Resolution 965 (1994), Resolution 978 (1995) and Resolution 997 (1995), the Council extended the mandate of the United Nations Assistance Mission for Rwanda (UNAMIR) for a final time, ending 8 March 1996, and adjusted its mandate.

It was noted that there were still elements of the old regime making military preparations and incursions into Rwanda and for neighbouring countries to take measures to prevent this and in this context welcomed the establishment of the Resolution 1013 (1995). Rwanda had to provide a climate of trust and confidence for the safe return of refugees. The Government of Rwanda was praised for its efforts to promote peace, security, reconstruction and rehabilitation in the country.

After extending UNAMIR's mandate for a final time until 8 March 1996, the current conditions warranted an adjustment in its mandate, as follows:

(a) to help contribute to the safe return of refugees;
(b) to assist the Rwandan government in promoting a climate of trust and confidence for the return of refugees;
(c) to assist the United Nations High Commissioner for Refugees and provide logistical support;
(d) to contribute towards the security of the International Criminal Tribunal for Rwanda.

The Secretary-General Boutros Boutros-Ghali was then requested to:

(a) reduce the force level of UNAMIR to 1,200 troops;
(b) reduce the number of military observers, headquarters and other support staff to 200;
(c) initiate planning for the complete withdrawal of UNAMIR;
(d) withdraw the Civilian Police component of UNAMIR;
(e) examine the feasibility of transferring UNAMIR non-lethal equipment for use in Rwanda.

Humanitarian assistance to Rwanda was welcomed and urged, and the secretary-general was asked to report to the council by 1 February 1996 on the withdrawal of UNAMIR. The resolution was adopted amid calls from Rwanda that the mission leave, and that it had done "nothing to prevent the massacres and they [UNAMIR] did not even assist people in danger".

== See also ==
- List of United Nations Security Council Resolutions 1001 to 1100 (1995–1997)
- Rwandan Civil War
- Rwandan genocide
- United Nations Observer Mission Uganda–Rwanda
