= United Nations Security Council Resolution 1161 =

United Nations Security Council resolution

UN Security Council Resolution 1161
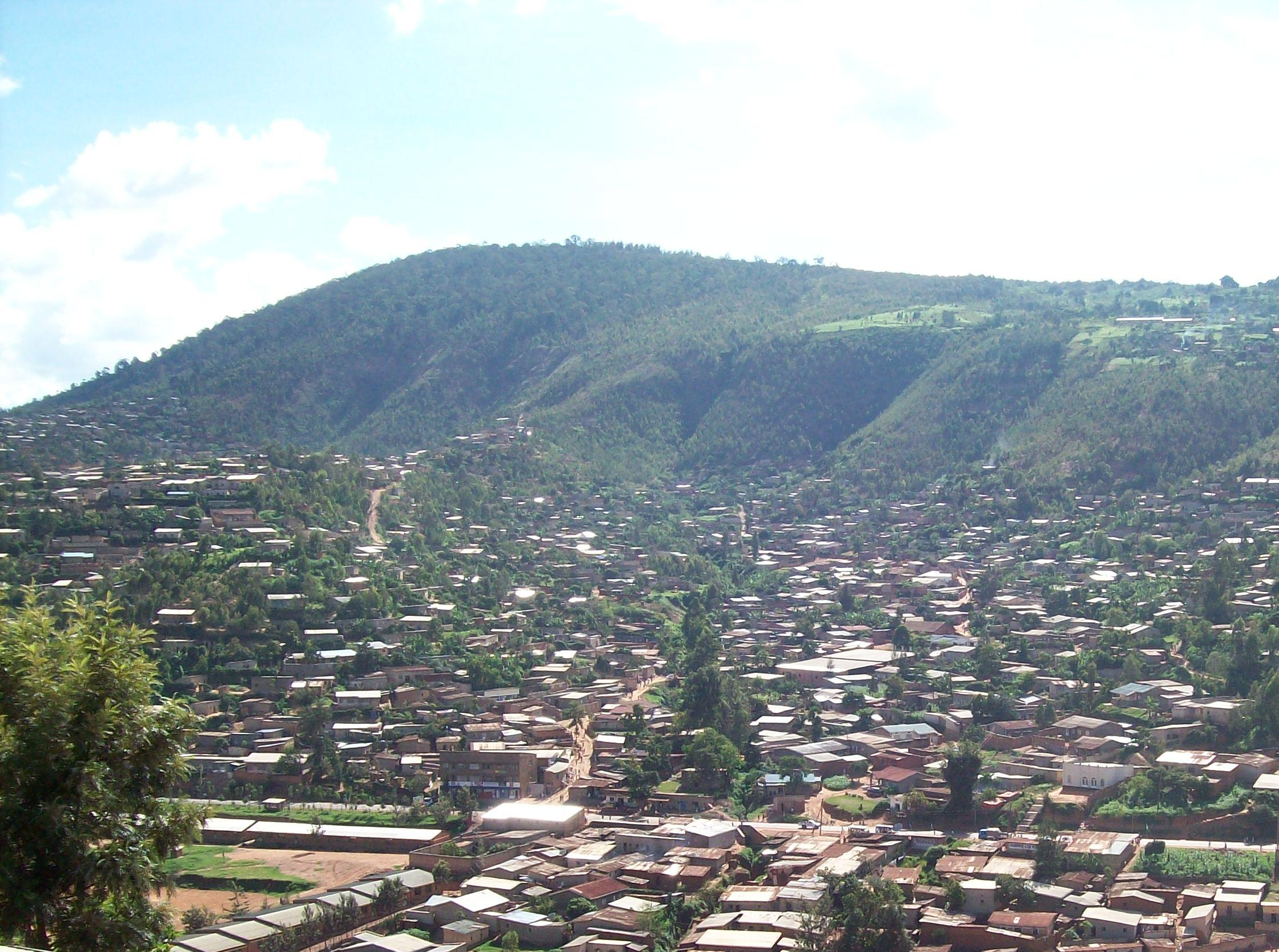
- Mount Kigali in the Rwandan capital Kigali
- Date: 9 April 1998
- Meeting no.: 3,870
- Code: S/RES/1161 (Document)
- Subject: The situation concerning Rwanda
- Voting summary: 15 voted for; None voted against; None abstained
- Result: Adopted

Security Council composition
- Permanent members: China; France; Russia; United Kingdom; United States
- Non-permanent members: Bahrain; Brazil; Costa Rica; Gabon; Gambia; Japan; Kenya; Portugal; Slovenia; Sweden

United Nations Security Council resolution 1161, adopted unanimously on 9 April 1998, after recalling all previous resolutions on Rwanda, particularly resolutions 918 (1994), 997 (1995), 1011 (1995), 1013 (1995) and 1053 (1996), the Council reactivated the Commission of Inquiry concerning violations of the arms embargo against former Rwandan government forces.

There were ongoing acts of violence in Rwanda, Burundi and the Great Lakes region, including the massacre of civilians in December 1997. At the same time, former Rwandan government forces were receiving weapons and materiel in violation of the arms embargo. The council noted that widespread violence in eastern Zaire had suspended the Commission of Inquiry's work, and therefore a resumption of its investigations were necessary in order to avoid further violence and acts of genocide. A long-term solution was needed to address the refugee problem and the dissemination of radio broadcasts and pamphlets which were spreading hatred in the region.

The Secretary-General Kofi Annan was requested to reactivate the Inquiry with the following mandate:

(a) to provide information on arms sales, deliveries, and shipments to Rwandan militias in the Great Lakes region;
(b) to identify parties participating in the arms flows;
(c) to make recommendations on the illegal arms flows.

All countries were asked to co-operate with the new investigation. Specifically, countries in the Great Lakes region were asked to ensure that their territory was not used as a base by armed groups to launch attacks into another state. The arms flows posed a threat to the security of the region. Finally, the Secretary-General was requested to report on the reactivation of the commission, within three months of its reactivation, and a further three months later in a final report with recommendations.

== See also ==
- Great Lakes refugee crisis
- List of United Nations Security Council Resolutions 1101 to 1200 (1997–1998)
- Rwandan genocide
- United Nations Observer Mission Uganda–Rwanda
