= United Nations Security Council Resolution 1053 =

UN Security Council Resolution 1053
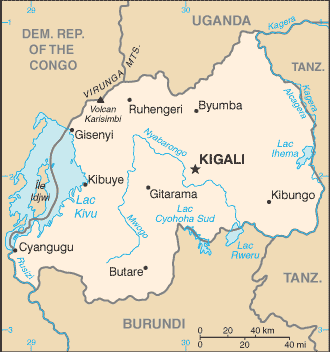
- Rwanda
- Date: 23 April 1996
- Meeting no.: 3,656
- Code: S/RES/1053 (Document)
- Subject: The situation in Rwanda
- Voting summary: 15 voted for; None voted against; None abstained
- Result: Adopted

Security Council composition
- Permanent members: China; France; Russia; United Kingdom; United States
- Non-permanent members: Botswana; Chile; Egypt; Guinea-Bissau; Germany; Honduras; Indonesia; Italy; South Korea; Poland

United Nations Security Council resolution 1053, adopted unanimously on 23 April 1996, after recalling all previous resolutions on Rwanda, particularly resolutions 918 (1994), 997 (1995), 1011 (1995) and 1013 (1995), the Council reviewed the findings of the Commission of Inquiry concerning violations of the arms embargo against former Rwandan government forces.

Despite the arms embargo, a number of violations were still reported with arms and materiel being sold to former Rwandan government forces. An inquiry had concluded its investigation, but it was noted that some countries had not fully co-operated with the investigation. The committee had concluded that Rwandan elements had received military training for the purposes of conducting destabilising raids into Rwanda, and there was strong evidence that arms deliveries had taken place. In one instance, there was a sale of weapons from the Seychelles in June 1994 and two subsequent shipments to Goma in the Democratic Republic of the Congo destined for Rwandan government forces. Aircraft were still continuing to land at Goma and Bukavu with arms for former Rwandan government forces and senior figures in those forces were raising funds for an armed struggle against Rwanda. These and continuing allegations had not been thoroughly investigated. Finally, radio broadcasts which spread hate and fear in the region needed to be terminated.

The ban on arms supplies to Rwandan government forces had not been effectively implemented. The countries in the Great Lakes region were asked to ensure that their territory was not used as a base for incursions or providing weapons into Rwanda. The Secretary-General Boutros Boutros-Ghali was asked to consult with the neighboring countries of Rwanda and Zaire in particular, on measures which could include the stationing of United Nations observers at airports and at border crossings. Countries whose citizens were accused of involvement were prompted to conduct further investigations and make all information available to the committee.

Finally, the Secretary-General was requested by 1 October 1996 to report on the implementation of the current resolution.

== See also ==
- Great Lakes refugee crisis
- List of United Nations Security Council Resolutions 1001 to 1100 (1995–1997)
- Rwandan genocide
- United Nations Observer Mission Uganda–Rwanda
