= United Nations Security Council Resolution 965 =

UN Security Council Resolution 965
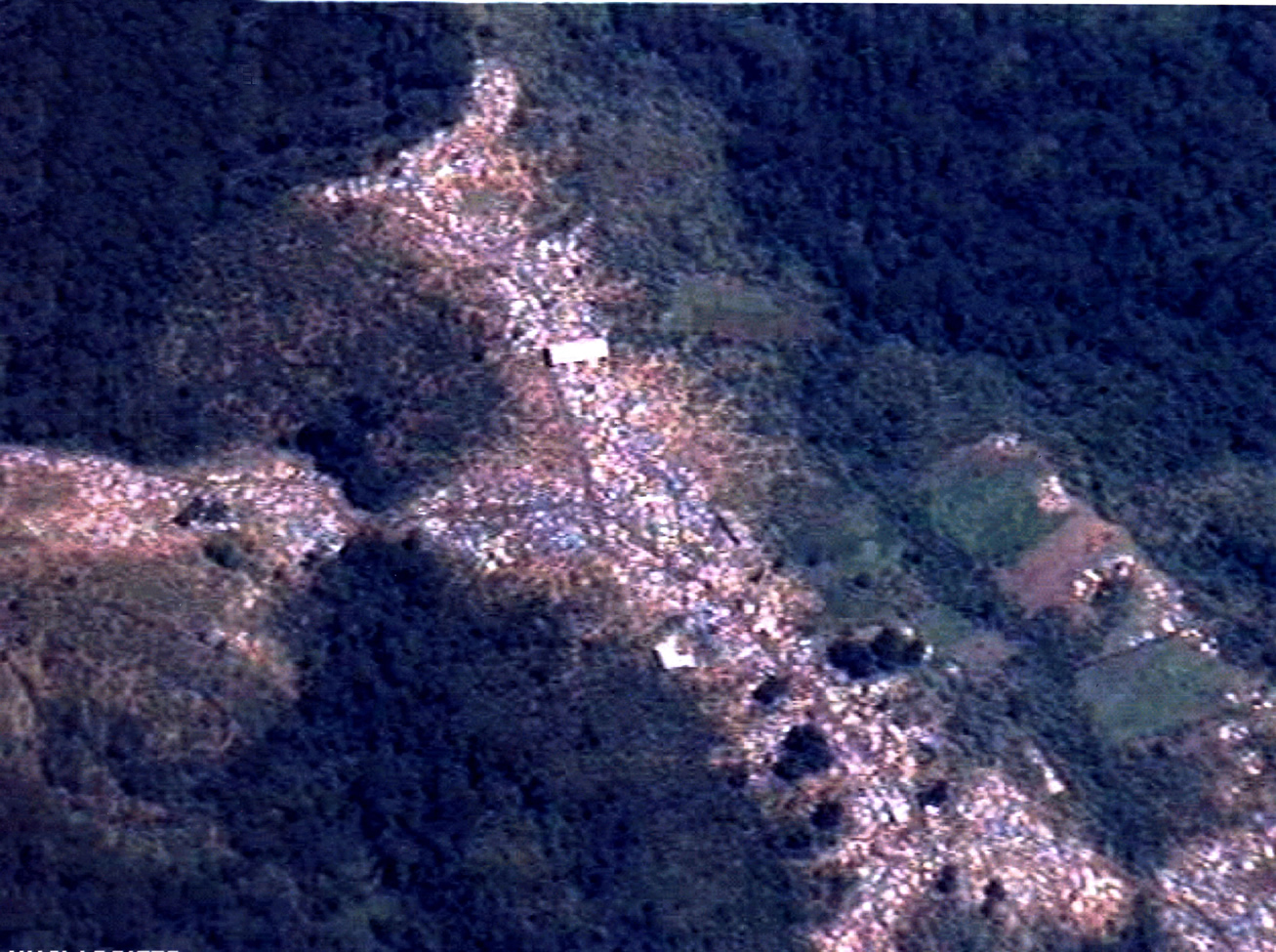
- Aerial photograph of the refugee camp in Mihanda near the Mitumba Mountains
- Date: 30 November 1994
- Meeting no.: 3,473
- Code: S/RES/965 (Document)
- Subject: Rwanda
- Voting summary: 15 voted for; None voted against; None abstained
- Result: Adopted

Security Council composition
- Permanent members: China; France; Russia; United Kingdom; United States
- Non-permanent members: Argentina; Brazil; Czech Republic; Djibouti; New Zealand; Nigeria; Oman; Pakistan; Rwanda; Spain

United Nations Security Council resolution 965, adopted unanimously on 30 November 1994, after reaffirming all resolutions on the situation in Rwanda, particularly resolutions 872 (1993), 912 (1994), 918 (1994), 925 (1994) and 955 (1994), the Council extended the mandate of the United Nations Assistance Mission for Rwanda (UNAMIR) until 9 June 1995 and expanded its operations.

The Security Council stressed the importance of achieving national reconciliation within the framework of the Arusha Accords. Monitors had been dispatched to Rwanda by the High Commissioner for Human Rights to monitor and prevent human rights violations from occurring and to facilitate the return of refugees. It was also noted that land mines had caused disruption to the civilian population and other humanitarian efforts.

It was reaffirmed that UNAMIR would:

(a) protect refugees, displaced persons and civilians at risk;
(b) provide security and support to facilitate humanitarian aid operations;
(c) help achieve national reconciliation;
(d) contribute to the security of International Criminal Tribunal for Rwanda personnel and human rights officers;
(e) assist in the training and establishment of a new police force.

The Government of Rwanda was urged to continue co-operation with UNAMIR and allow unimpeded access to all areas of the country. UNAMIR's efforts to increase its radio broadcasting capabilities was welcomed, as were the efforts of Member States, United Nations agencies and non-governmental organisations with regard to humanitarian assistance.

The Secretary-General Boutros Boutros-Ghali was asked to make recommendations concerning the establishment of a mine clearance programme and to notify the Council of any adjustment in the logistic and personnel requirements of UNAMIR. He was required to report by 9 February 1995 and 9 April 1995 on UNAMIR's mandate and the situation in the country. Finally, the international community was called upon to provide resources to the Rwandan government.

== See also ==
- History of Rwanda
- List of United Nations Security Council Resolutions 901 to 1000 (1994–1995)
- Rwandan Civil War
- Rwandan genocide
- United Nations Observer Mission Uganda–Rwanda
