= United Nations Security Council Resolution 1050 =

UN Security Council Resolution 1050
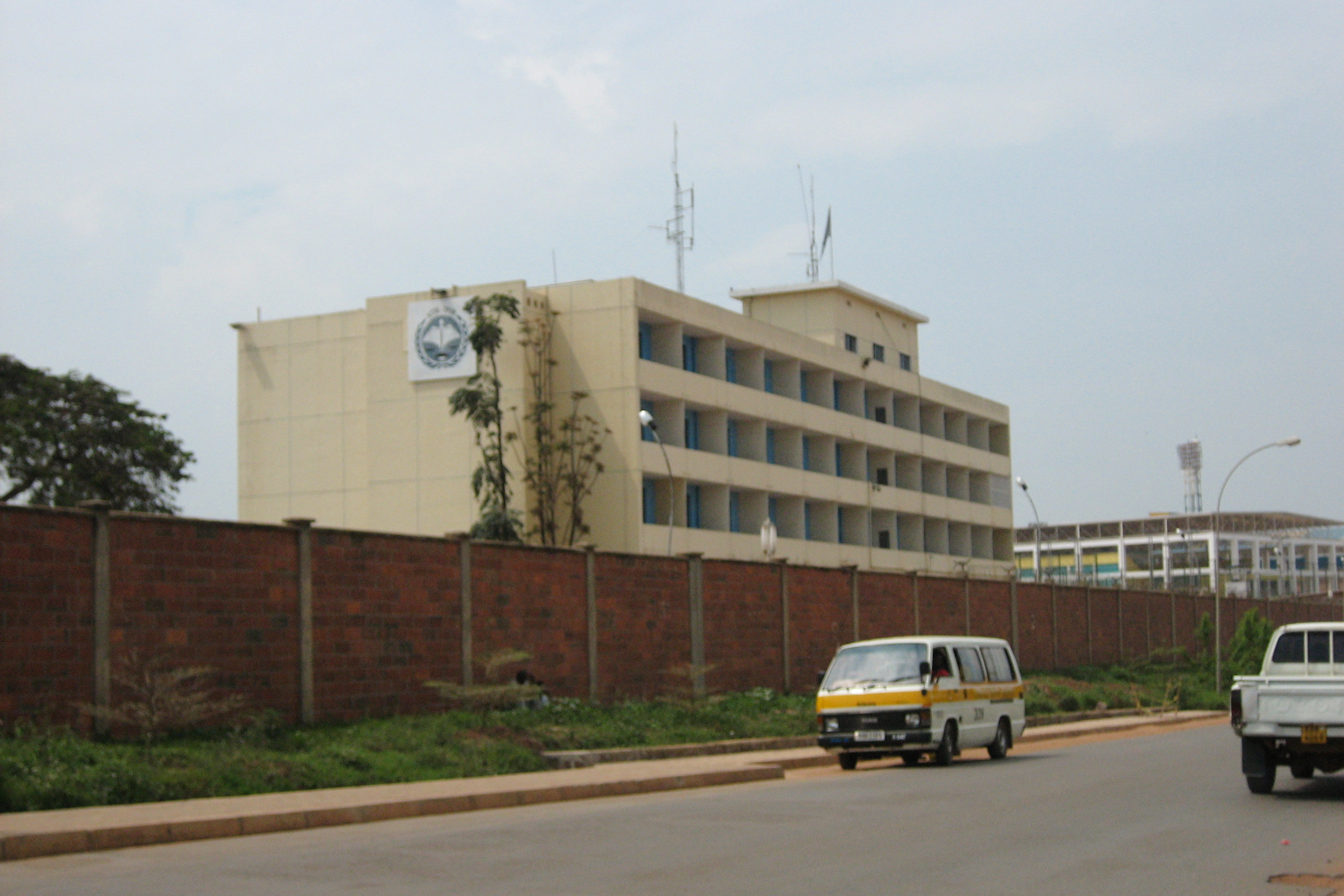
- ICTR in the Rwandan capital Kigali
- Date: 8 March 1996
- Meeting no.: 3,640
- Code: S/RES/1050 (Document)
- Subject: The situation in Rwanda
- Voting summary: 15 voted for; None voted against; None abstained
- Result: Adopted

Security Council composition
- Permanent members: China; France; Russia; United Kingdom; United States
- Non-permanent members: Botswana; Chile; Egypt; Guinea-Bissau; Germany; Honduras; Indonesia; Italy; South Korea; Poland

United Nations Security Council resolution 1050, adopted unanimously on 8 March 1996, after recalling all previous resolutions on Rwanda, the Council discussed arrangements for the withdrawal of the United Nations Assistance Mission for Rwanda (UNAMIR).

The Security Council stressed the importance of safe and voluntary return of refugees and national reconciliation, and of the Government of Rwanda to promote confidence, security and trust. Conference were held in Cairo and Addis Ababa concerning the refugee crisis, and the Council stressed the importance of a regional conference to address the issue. All countries were urged to co-operate with the Commission of Inquiry established in Resolution 1013 (1995) and with the human rights operation in Rwanda. The Council remained convinced that the United Nations continue to play a role in the country.

As requested in Resolution 1029 (1995), the Secretary-General Boutros Boutros-Ghali was to begin withdrawing UNAMIR from Rwanda on 9 March 1996. All remaining elements of UNAMIR would contribute to the security and protection of the International Criminal Tribunal for Rwanda. With the consent of the Rwandan government, the Secretary-General was encouraged to continue the operation of the communications system and radio station to promote national reconciliation, strengthen the judicial system, facilitate the return of refugees and restore the country's infrastructure.

Finally, the Secretary-General was asked by 5 April 1996 to report on the arrangements with Rwanda were made in relation to the protection of the Rwanda Tribunal after the withdrawal of UNAMIR, and other aforementioned issues.

== See also ==
- Great Lakes refugee crisis
- List of United Nations Security Council Resolutions 1001 to 1100 (1995–1997)
- Rwandan genocide
- United Nations Observer Mission Uganda–Rwanda
