= United Nations Security Council Resolution 929 =

UN Security Council Resolution 929
- Map of Rwanda showing Zone Turqouise and RRF's advance during the genocide.
- Date: 22 June 1994
- Meeting no.: 3,392
- Code: S/RES/929 (Document)
- Subject: Rwanda
- Voting summary: 10 voted for; None voted against; 5 abstained
- Result: Adopted

Security Council composition
- Permanent members: China; France; Russia; United Kingdom; United States
- Non-permanent members: Argentina; Brazil; Czech Republic; Djibouti; New Zealand; Nigeria; Oman; Pakistan; Rwanda; Spain

United Nations Security Council resolution 929, adopted on 22 June 1994, after recalling all resolutions on Rwanda, including 912 (1994), 918 (1994) and 925 (1994), the council authorised, under Chapter VII of the United Nations Charter, the temporary establishment of a multinational operation in the country to assist in humanitarian efforts and protect refugees and displaced people, until the full deployment of the expanded United Nations Assistance Mission for Rwanda (UNAMIR).

The security council called for the resumption of the political process under the Arusha Peace Agreement. It also anticipated the expansion of UNAMIR and stressed that it was solely a humanitarian force that would be impartial in nature. Concern was expressed at the continuation of the systematic and widespread killings of civilians in Rwanda to which the international community must respond.

It was agreed to establish a humanitarian operation headed by France until UNAMIR was at full strength. The operation intended to ensure the safety of displaced persons, refugees and civilians. It was limited to a period of two months following the adoption of the present resolution, and would be financed by the Member States participating themselves. Meanwhile, member states were urged to provide necessary support and to contribute to UNAMIR to enable the rapid expansion of its mission.

The Rwandan parties were urged to immediately cease the killings. The Secretary-General Boutros Boutros-Ghali and the countries participating in the operation were requested to report on a regular basis to the council, with the first report due in 15 days. The secretary-general himself was required to report back on the expansion of UNAMIR and the resumption of the peace process.

Resolution 929 was adopted by 10 votes to none against, with five abstentions from Brazil, China, New Zealand, Nigeria and Pakistan.

== See also ==
- History of Rwanda
- List of United Nations Security Council Resolutions 901 to 1000 (1994–1995)
- Rwandan Civil War
- Rwandan genocide
- United Nations Observer Mission Uganda–Rwanda
