= United Nations Security Council Resolution 1005 =

UN Security Council Resolution 1005
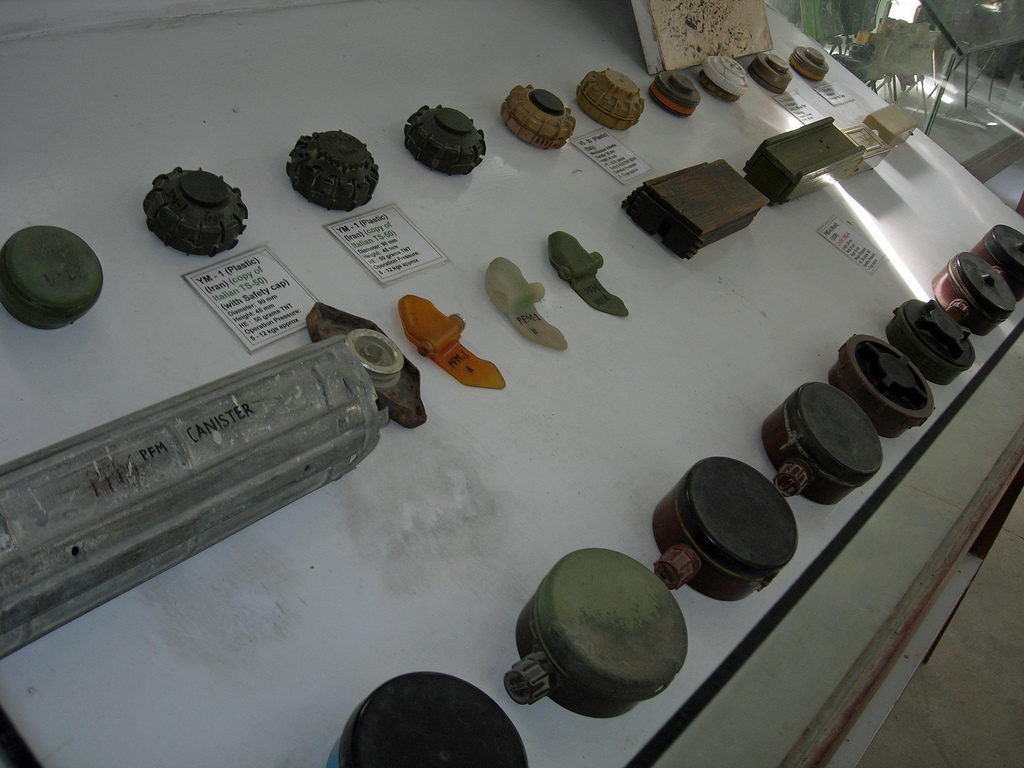
- Land mines
- Date: 17 July 1995
- Meeting no.: 3,555
- Code: S/RES/1005 (Document)
- Subject: Rwanda
- Voting summary: 15 voted for; None voted against; None abstained
- Result: Adopted

Security Council composition
- Permanent members: China; France; Russia; United Kingdom; United States
- Non-permanent members: Argentina; Botswana; Czech Republic; Germany; Honduras; Indonesia; Italy; Nigeria; Oman; Rwanda

United Nations Security Council resolution 1005, was unanimously adopted on 17 July 1995, after recalling resolutions 918 (1994) and 997 (1995) on the situation in Rwanda. The Council noted the hazards posed by land mines and, acting under Chapter VII of the United Nations Charter, authorised appropriate amounts of explosives to be used exclusively for demining programmes in the country.

The Council noted the will of the Government of Rwanda to address the issue of unexploded land mines and the interest of other states to assist with the destruction of the land mines in Rwanda. It underlined the importance the Council placed on efforts to eliminate the threat posed by unexploded land mines in several countries and the nature of humanitarian demining programmes.

It was recognised that the demining process would require the use of explosives. The explosives could be provided to Rwanda despite the arms embargo imposed on the country, with prior approval from the Committee of the Security Council established in Resolution 918.

== See also ==
- List of United Nations Security Council Resolutions 1001 to 1100 (1995–1997)
- Rwandan Civil War
- Rwandan genocide
- United Nations Assistance Mission for Rwanda
- United Nations Observer Mission Uganda–Rwanda
