= United Nations Security Council Resolution 978 =

UN Security Council Resolution 978
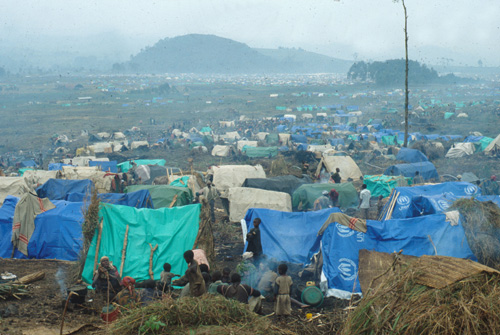
- Rwandan refugee camp in eastern Zaire (now Democratic Republic of Congo)
- Date: 27 February 1995
- Meeting no.: 3,504
- Code: S/RES/978 (Document)
- Subject: Rwanda
- Voting summary: 15 voted for; None voted against; None abstained
- Result: Adopted

Security Council composition
- Permanent members: China; France; Russia; United Kingdom; United States
- Non-permanent members: Argentina; Botswana; Czech Republic; Germany; Honduras; Indonesia; Italy; Nigeria; Oman; Rwanda

United Nations Security Council resolution 978, adopted unanimously on 27 February 1995, after recalling all previous resolutions on Rwanda, including 935 (1994) and 955 (1994), the Council instructed Member States on the arrest and detention of persons responsible for acts during the Rwandan genocide, within the jurisdiction of the International Criminal Tribunal for Rwanda (ICTR).

The security council expressed its concern about reports of genocide and systematic violations of international humanitarian law committed in Rwanda. Such reports were confirmed by the Commission of Experts pursuant to Resolution 935. There was also concern regarding attacks against refugees who voluntarily wish to return to Rwanda and the situation in the refugee camps. It was asserted that those responsible for the acts would be brought to justice.

Addressing Member States, the Council called for the arrest of persons in their territory for whom there was sufficient evidence that they were responsible for acts carried out within the jurisdiction of the ICTR. Countries that arrested suspects were to inform the Secretary-General Boutros Boutros-Ghali and the Prosecutor Richard Goldstone at the ICTR of relevant details concerning their identity, the cause for their detention and evidence against them. The relevant countries were also asked to co-operate with representatives from the International Committee of the Red Cross and investigators at the ICTR.

All attacks on people at the refugee camps on the borders of Rwanda were strongly condemned and the council called for the prevention of such acts. States in which territory the attacks took place in were urged to take action in accordance with the national and international law and to detain and gather evidence against those responsible.

Resolution 978 was non-binding on member states, as Chapter VII was not invoked.

== See also ==
- List of United Nations Security Council Resolutions 901 to 1000 (1994–1995)
- Rwandan Civil War
- Rwandan genocide
- United Nations Observer Mission Uganda–Rwanda
