= United Nations Security Council Resolution 935 =

UN Security Council Resolution 935
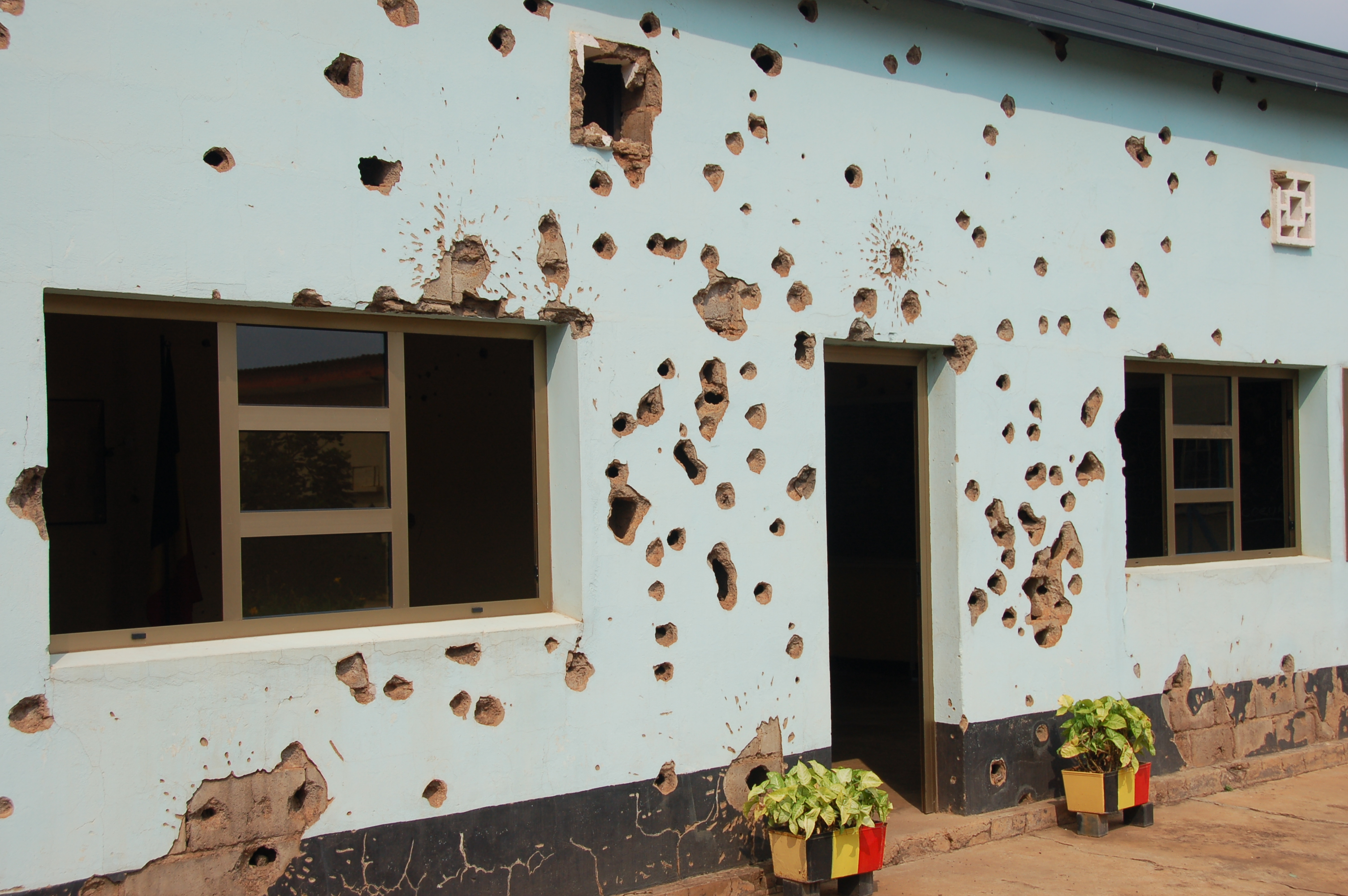
- Memorial to 10 Belgian soldiers killed in Kigali
- Date: 1 July 1994
- Meeting no.: 3,400
- Code: S/RES/935 (Document)
- Subject: Rwanda
- Voting summary: 15 voted for; None voted against; None abstained
- Result: Adopted

Security Council composition
- Permanent members: China; France; Russia; United Kingdom; United States
- Non-permanent members: Argentina; Brazil; Czech Republic; Djibouti; New Zealand; Nigeria; Oman; Pakistan; Rwanda; Spain

United Nations Security Council resolution 935, adopted unanimously on 1 July 1994, after recalling all resolutions on Rwanda, particularly 918 (1994) and 925 (1994), the Council requested the Secretary-General Boutros Boutros-Ghali to establish a Commission of Experts to investigate violations of international humanitarian law during the Rwandan genocide.

The Council stressed the need for the early deployment of the United Nations Assistance Mission for Rwanda so that it could fulfill its mandate. Statements by the President of the Security Council and Secretary-General concerning violations of international humanitarian law in Rwanda were recalled, with the Council noting that only a full investigation could establish the facts of what occurred and therefore determine responsibility. A visit by the United Nations High Commissioner for Human Rights and the appointment of a Special Rapporteur for Rwanda was welcomed.

Concern was expressed at the continuing reports of systematic killings in Rwanda, including reports of genocide, and noting those responsible for the acts committed should be brought to justice. In this regard, the Council requested that the Secretary-General establish an impartial Commission of Experts to investigate reports of violations of international humanitarian law and report to the Secretary-General. All states and international organisations were urged to collect information in a similar manner to the Commission of Experts and additionally on breaches of the Genocide Convention, making the information gathered available within 30 days of the adoption of the present resolution.

The secretary-general was requested to report to the council on the establishment of the Commission of Experts and to report on its findings within four months. The Secretary-General was also required, along with the High Commissioner for Human Rights, to make information submitted to the Special Rapporteur for Rwanda available to the commission. All concerned were urged to co-operate with the Commission in order for it to accomplish its mandate.

On 26 July 1994, Boutros Boutros-Ghali appointed Mr. Atsu-Koffi Amega, a former member of the African Commission on Human and Peoples' Rights from Togo to chair the commission, Ms. Haby Dieng, a prosecutor from Guinea and Mr. Salifou Fomba, an international law professor from Mali. International criminal law expert Professor Lyal S. Sunga was recruited to bolster the commission's investigations and draft its reports to the security council. Following extensive investigations throughout Rwanda, by early November 1994, the Commission of Experts recommended that the Security Council establish the International Criminal Tribunal for Rwanda which the Council did on 8 November 1994 by way of adopting resolution 955 (1994).

== See also ==
- History of Rwanda
- International Criminal Tribunal for Rwanda
- List of United Nations Security Council Resolutions 901 to 1000 (1994–1995)
- Rwandan Civil War
- Rwandan genocide
- United Nations Observer Mission Uganda–Rwanda
