= United Nations Security Council Resolution 1011 =

UN Security Council Resolution 1011
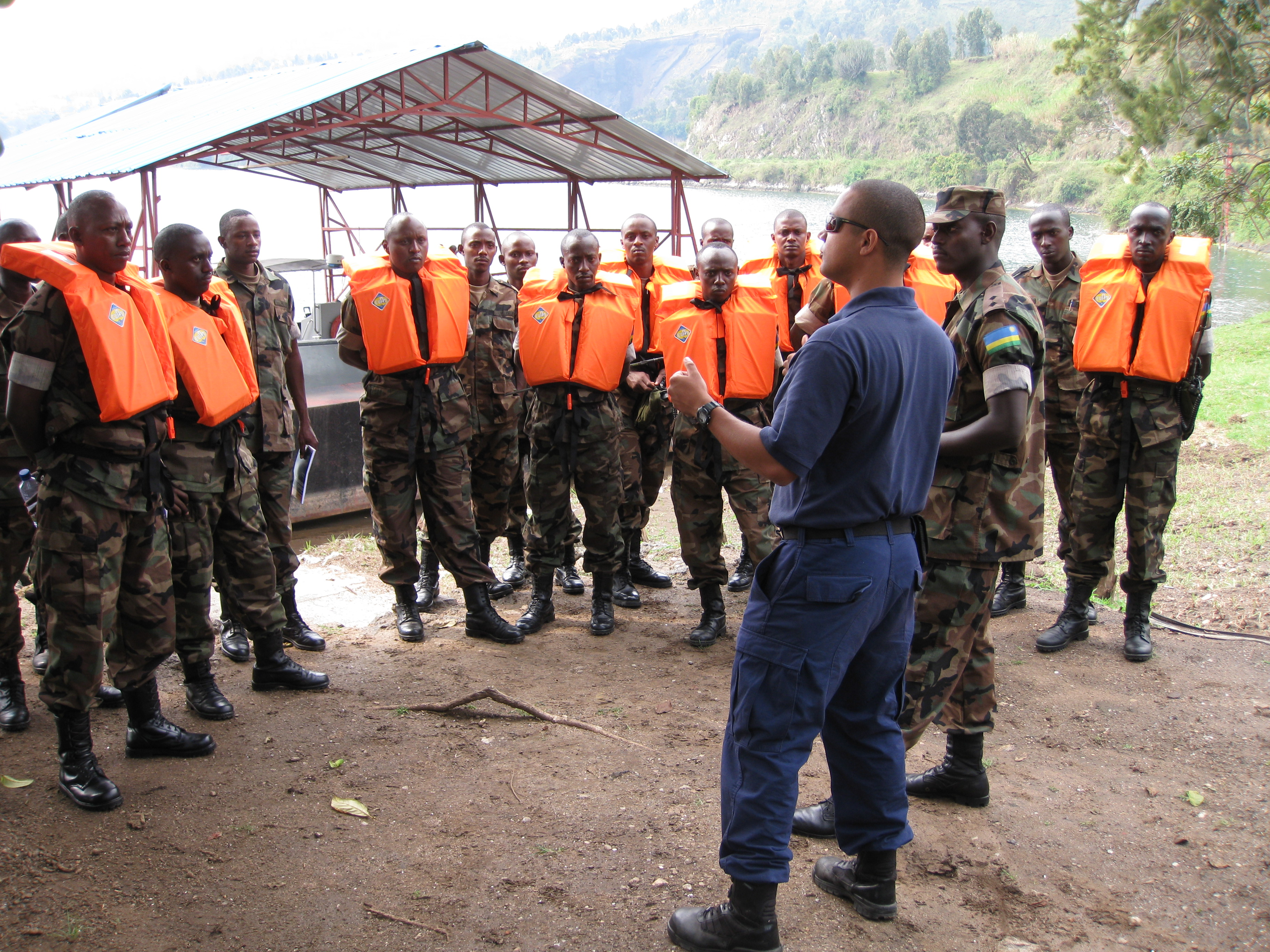
- Rwandan marines
- Date: 16 August 1995
- Meeting no.: 3,566
- Code: S/RES/1011 (Document)
- Subject: Rwanda
- Voting summary: 15 voted for; None voted against; None abstained
- Result: Adopted

Security Council composition
- Permanent members: China; France; Russia; United Kingdom; United States
- Non-permanent members: Argentina; Botswana; Czech Republic; Germany; Honduras; Indonesia; Italy; Nigeria; Oman; Rwanda

United Nations Security Council resolution 1011, adopted unanimously on 16 August 1995, after recalling resolutions 918 (1994), 997 (1995) and 1005 (1995) on the situation in Rwanda, the Council suspended the arms embargo against the Government of Rwanda.

The Security Council received a report from the Secretary-General Boutros Boutros-Ghali on the monitoring of restrictions on the transfer of weapons and on the progress of the United Nations Assistance Mission for Rwanda mission. Possession of arms among the population was a major destabilising factor in the Great Lakes region. Zaire had proposed an international commission under the auspices of the United Nations to investigate arms supplies to former Rwandan government forces. The registration and marking of weapons would do much to control and enforce restrictions.

There was concern regarding incursions into Rwanda by elements of the former regime and underlining the need for effective measures to ensure that Rwandan nationals in neighbouring countries could not undertake activities or receive weapons in order to destabilise the country. All sections of the Rwandan population, except those involved in genocide, had to begin talks. Rwanda demanded that the arms embargo against the Rwandan government be lifted to ensure the security of its people. It was originally recalled that the arms embargo was in place to prevent the use of weapons and equipment in the massacres of innocent people. There had already decided to reduce the size of UNAMIR and that the Rwandan government was responsible for the safety of the population.

The Council drew attention to Rwanda's legal system, particularly overcrowding, lack of judges, the detention of minors and the elderly and the lack of a quick judicial process. In this regard, efforts by the United Nations and donors in collaboration with Rwanda to improve the situation were welcomed.

The Secretary-General was requested as soon as possible to make recommendations on a commission to conduct an investigation into the arms flows to former Rwandan government forces in the Great Lakes region. At the same time, Rwanda and its neighbours were asked to co-operate with the commission. Within a month, Boutros-Ghali was to report on preparations for convening a regional Conference on Security, Stability and Development and the repatriation of refugees. The Rwandan government was called upon to create an atmosphere of trust and confidence for the safe return of refugees and resolve humanitarian problems in its prisons.

Acting under Chapter VII of the United Nations Charter, the council then decided that the arms embargo against the Rwandan government would be suspended until 1 September 1996, through a number of access points to the country, of which Member States would be notified. After that date, the weapon restrictions against the Rwandan government would be terminated. Arms deliveries to groups other than that to the Rwandan government were prohibited, and the resale of the weapons was also prevented. In this regard, countries providing weapons to Rwanda would be required to notify the committee established by Resolution 918. The Secretary-General was requested within six and then within twelve months to report on those supplies.

== See also ==
- List of United Nations Security Council Resolutions 1001 to 1100 (1995–1997)
- Rwandan Civil War
- Rwandan genocide
- United Nations Observer Mission Uganda–Rwanda
