= United Nations Security Council Resolution 997 =

UN Security Council Resolution 997
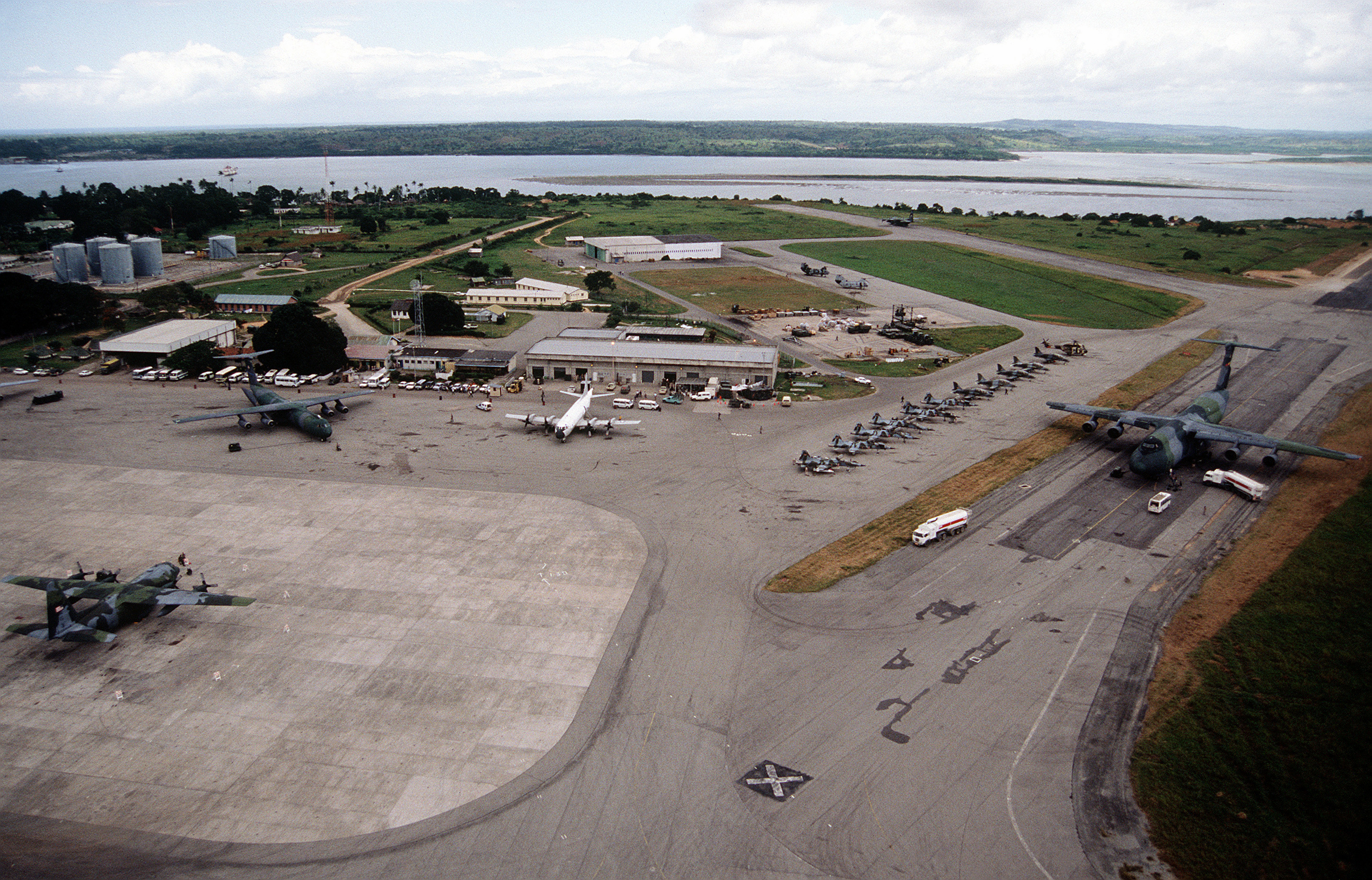
- Planes carrying relief supplies to Rwandan refugees in Zaire
- Date: 9 June 1995
- Meeting no.: 3,542
- Code: S/RES/997 (Document)
- Subject: Rwanda
- Voting summary: 15 voted for; None voted against; None abstained
- Result: Adopted

Security Council composition
- Permanent members: China; France; Russia; United Kingdom; United States
- Non-permanent members: Argentina; Botswana; Czech Republic; Germany; Honduras; Indonesia; Italy; Nigeria; Oman; Rwanda

United Nations Security Council resolution 997, adopted unanimously on 9 June 1995, after reaffirming all resolutions on the situation in Rwanda, particularly resolutions 872 (1993), 912 (1994), 918 (1994), 925 (1994), 955 (1994) and 965 (1994), the Council extended the mandate of the United Nations Assistance Mission for Rwanda (UNAMIR) until 8 December 1995 and adjusted its operations from peacekeeping to confidence-building.

National reconciliation in Rwanda was important for the council. There were reports that members of the former regime in Rwanda were increasing incursions into the country and military planning and in this respect measures were urged to prevent Rwandan nationals in other countries do not undertake in activities aimed at destabilising Rwanda. More international support was needed for the rehabilitation and reconciliation process. Meanwhile, the Secretary-General Boutros Boutros-Ghali intended for a conference to be held on matters relating to the refugee problem in the Great Lakes region.

After extending UNAMIR's mandate, its size was reduced to 2,330 troops within three months and 1,800 within four months, though the number of military observers and police personnel was to be maintained. UNAMIR's mandate was adapted to:

(a) help achieve national reconciliation;
(b) facilitate the return of refugees and displaced persons;
(c) support humanitarian assistance and demining;
(d) assist in the training of a national police force;
(e) protect United Nations agencies, humanitarian organisations and the International Criminal Tribunal for Rwanda.

Countries neighbouring Rwanda were urged to address and prevent factors destabilising Rwanda, including the transfer of weapons and materiel into the country from their territory. The Secretary-General was asked to consult with neighbouring countries on the deployment of military observers to the border regions, including airfields in eastern Zaire, to monitor the transfer of arms and materiel.

Finally, all countries and donors were urged to provide assistance to Rwanda in line with their commitments, and the secretary-general was requested to submit reports on the humanitarian situation to the council by 9 August 1995 and 9 October 1995.

== See also ==
- History of Rwanda
- List of United Nations Security Council Resolutions 901 to 1000 (1994–1995)
- Rwandan Civil War
- Rwandan genocide
- United Nations Observer Mission Uganda–Rwanda
