= Opération Turquoise =

1994 French-led military operation in Rwanda

- Map showing the advance of the RPF during the genocide and the location of Zone Turquoise.
- Date: 23 June 1994 – 21 August 1994

Opération Turquoise was a French-led military operation in Rwanda in 1994 under the mandate of the United Nations. The "multilateral" force consisted of 2,500 troops, 32 from Senegal and the rest French. The equipment included 100 APCs, 10 helicopters, a battery of 120 mm mortars, 4 Jaguar fighter bombers, 8 Mirage fighters, and reconnaissance aircraft. The helicopters laid a trail of food, water and medicine enabling refugees to escape into eastern Zaire. Opération Turquoise is controversial for two reasons: accusations that it was an attempt to prop up the Hutu regime responsible for the Rwandan genocide, and that its mandate undermined the UNAMIR.

The charges raised against the French army during Operation Turquoise are of "complicity of genocide and/or complicity of crimes against humanity." The victims allege that French soldiers did nothing to stop the genocide and let Interahamwe militias escape to Zaire after the massacres. The former Rwandan ambassador to France and co-founder of the RPF Jacques Bihozagara testified, "Operation Turquoise was aimed only at protecting genocide perpetrators, because the genocide continued even within the Turquoise zone." France has always denied any role in the killing. Around 2 million Rwandan refugees fled into Congo during the genocide, both Tutsis and Hutus. The presence of perpetrators of the genocide among them was one of the main reasons for the outbreak of the First Congo War in 1996.

== Background ==
On 6 April 1994 Rwandan President Juvénal Habyarimana and Burundian President Cyprien Ntaryamira were assassinated, sparking the Rwandan genocide against the Tutsi. The United Nations already had a peacekeeping force, the United Nations Assistance Mission for Rwanda (UNAMIR), in Kigali that had been tasked with observing that the Arusha Accords were being carried out. Following the start of the genocide and the murder of several kidnapped Belgian soldiers, Belgium withdrew its contribution to UNAMIR, which was commanded by Canadian Roméo Dallaire; Dallaire was prohibited from involving the force in the protection of civilians. By late April, several of the non-permanent members of the United Nations Security Council (UNSC) were trying to convince the major powers to agree to a UNAMIR II. As opposed to UNAMIR, which had a peacekeeping mandate under Chapter VI of the U.N. Charter, UNAMIR II would be authorised under Chapter VII to enable the UN to prevent further harm.

The French had provided the Hutu-dominated Habyarimana government with extensive military, and diplomatic support, including a military intervention to save the government during an offensive by the rebel Tutsi-led Rwandan Patriotic Front (RPF) in 1990. Immediately after the genocide began, the RPF began another offensive to overthrow the genocidal government and steadily gained ground. By late June, the RPF controlled much of the country and was nearing a complete victory. RPF units carried out retributive attacks within areas they controlled, but they were not of the scale and organization as those carried out in the genocide.

== Implementation ==
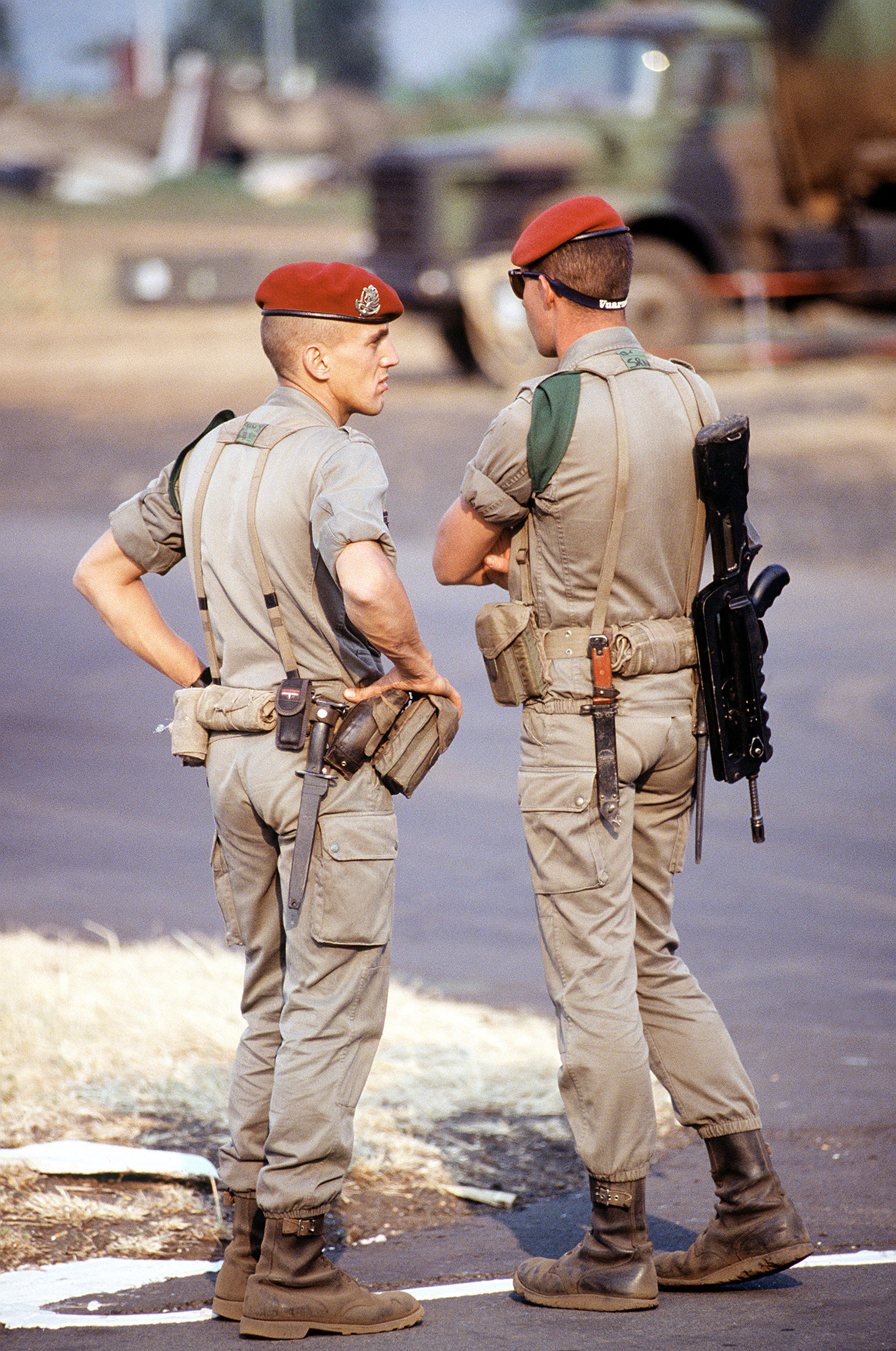
French parachutists, part of the international military force supporting the Rwandan relief effort, stand guard at the airport.

On 19 June, the French government made an announcement of their intentions to organize, establish, and maintain a "safe zone" in the south-west of Rwanda. At the brink of defeat and retreat, the news of an intervention from their allies was broadcast across the country by the genocidaires, with a consequent increase in their confidence, and the continuation of their hunt for genocide survivors. The French said the objectives of Opération Turquoise were:

to maintain a presence pending the arrival of the expanded UNAMIR… The objectives assigned to that force would be the same ones assigned to UNAMIR by the Security Council, i.e. contributing to the security and protection of displaced persons, refugees and civilians in danger in Rwanda, by means including the establishment and maintenance, where possible, of safe humanitarian areas.

On 20 June, France sent a draft resolution to the UNSC for authorization of Operation Turquoise under a two-month Chapter VII mandate. After two days of consultations and the personal approval of the U.N. Secretary General, it was adopted as Resolution 929 (1994), on 22 June, with 10 votes of approval and 5 abstentions. The "multilateral" force consisted of 2,500 troops, only 32 of them being from Senegal and the rest French. The equipment included 100 APCs, 10 helicopters, a battery of 120 mm mortars, 4 Jaguar fighter bombers, 8 Mirage fighters, and reconnaissance aircraft. The helicopters were intended to lay a trail of food, water and medicine. The area that was selected ended up with the result that refugees were enabled to escape predominantly westward, into eastern Zaire. The zone affected by Operation Turquoise was changed after 2 members of a French reconnaissance unit were captured by the victorious RPF rebels and were released in exchange for a revision in the area of Operation Turquoise.

There was an evacuation of the population westward, enforced by the Hutu regime, now set to flee from the Tutsi rebels, after it had been made clear the French were there to provide only a "safe zone", rather than assistance in the conflict. Unfortunately, there were roadblocks and checkpoints along the way, and the Tutsis left alive, and even Hutus without ID cards, were killed. The outflow of refugees exacerbated the already great numbers of refugees in the region, known as the Great Lakes refugee crisis spilling out of Rwanda, and neighbouring Hutu-Tutsi Burundi, predominantly into Zaire. Approximately, 2.1 million people lived in Zaire in refugee camps. These camps contained the Rwandan state military (FAR) which led to the invasion of Zaire by Rwanda, Burundi and Uganda, known as the First Congo War.

The area of French influence, known as Zone Turquoise, within the Cyangugu-Kibuye-Gikongoro triangle, was spread across a fifth of the country. Although it was meant to save lives and stop the mass killings, killings did occur. When the Hutu government moved the Radio Télévision Libre des Mille-Collines radio transmitter, a key tool in encouraging Hutus to kill their Tutsi neighbors, into the Zone Turquoise, the French did not seize it. The radio broadcast from Gisenyi, calling on "you Hutu girls to wash yourselves and put on a good dress to welcome our French allies. The Tutsi girls are all dead, so you have your chance." The French did not detain the government officials they knew had helped coordinate the genocide. When asked to explain that in the French parliament, the French foreign minister of the time argued that the UN mandate given to the French contained no authorization to investigate or arrest suspected war criminals. Regardless, French President François Mitterrand claimed that the Operation had saved "tens of thousands of lives".

The force left as the mandate of the operation expired on 21 August. The RPF immediately occupied the region, causing another refugee outflow.

== Controversy ==
Opération Turquoise is controversial for two reasons: accusations that it was a failed attempt to prop up the genocidal Hutu regime and that its mandate undermined the UNAMIR.

The RPF, well aware that French assistance to the government had helped blunt their 1990 offensive, opposed the deployment of a French-led force. By early June, the RPF had managed to sweep through the eastern half of the country and move south and west, while besieging Kigali in the center. The advance resulted in a massive refugee outflow, though the Hutu government was also implicated in encouraging the flight (see Great Lakes refugee crisis.) Regardless, the Zone Turquoise was created in the steadily shrinking areas out of RPF control. The RPF was one of many organisations that noted that the French initiative to safeguard the populace was occurring six weeks after it had become apparent mass killings were occurring in Rwanda. On 22 July, French Prime Minister Édouard Balladur addressed the Security Council, stating that France had a "moral duty" to act without delay and that "without swift action, the survival of an entire country was at stake and the stability of a region seriously compromised."

In May 2006, the Paris Court of Appeal accepted six courtsuits deposed by victims of the genocide to magistrate Brigitte Reynaud. The charges raised against the French army during Operation Turquoise from June to August 1994 are of "complicity of genocide and/or complicity of crimes against humanity." The victims allege that French soldiers engaged in Operation Turquoise did nothing to stop the massacres and allowed Interahamwe militias to escape the country in the aftermath. The former Rwandan ambassador to France and co-founder of the RPF Jacques Bihozagara testified, "Operation Turquoise was aimed only at protecting genocide perpetrators, because the genocide continued even within the Turquoise zone." France has always denied any role in the killing.

UNAMIR Force Commander Dallaire had also opposed the deployment, having sent extensive communication back to U.N. Headquarters that the placement of two U.N.-authorised commands with different mandates and command structures into the same country was problematic. Dallaire was also a strong proponent of strengthening UNAMIR and transitioning it to a Chapter VII mandate, rather than introducing a new organisation. Concern over conflicting mandates led to five countries on the UNSC to abstain in the vote approving the force. The UN-sponsored "Report of the Independent Inquiry into the Actions of the UN during the 1994 Genocide in Rwanda" found it "unfortunate that the resources committed by France and other countries to Operation Turquoise could not instead have been put at the disposal of UNAMIR II." On 21 June, Dallaire replaced 42 UNAMIR peacekeepers from Francophone Congo, Senegal and Togo with UN staff from Kenya after the negative reaction of the RPF to Opération Turquoise. Over the two months of the mandate, there were confrontations, and risk of confrontations, between RPF and French-led units around the zone, during which UNAMIR was asked to convey messages between the two. The UN independent inquiry drily noted that this was "a role which must be considered awkward to say the least."
