= Jacques Bihozagara =

Rwandian diplomat

Jacques Bihozagara (February 25, 1945 – March 30, 2016, age 71) was a Rwandan diplomat. He served as the Rwandan ambassador to France and Belgium. He was a former Rehabilitation and Social Integration minister for the Rwandan government. In 1987, Bihozagara co-founded Rwandan Patriotic Front (RPF), which had a significant impact during the Rwandan genocide of 1994. After retiring due to failing health, he began to invest his pension in small-scale real estate projects and various small business ventures.

== Life after political career ==
After retiring from his political career, Bihozagara began a six year long attempt to become a citizen of Burundi due to harassment and frustration caused by the regime in Kigali. His applications for citizenship were denied. It is presumed that the main factor in these denials was due to the fact that Bihozagara was not living in Burundi. Bihozagara then traveled to Burundi to conduct business and visit family. He owned assets and properties in Burundi.

== Arrest and death ==
In December 2015, Bihozagara was arrested on suspicion of espionage after weapons were found in his house in Kinindo. He died in a Burundi jail in March 2016. The events surrounding his death remain unclear, though it has been rumored that Bihozagara was assassinated, most likely by poisoning. Other prisoners detained in the same prison stated that Bihozagara was in fairly good health until the day of his death. He died only minutes after arriving at the prison infirmary.

It took more than a week for an autopsy to be performed. After the autopsy, his body was returned to his family. Due to the condition of the body, which appeared to have deep bruises and visible scarring on his face, it is assumed that Bihozagara had been tortured. A full autopsy was not performed prior to his funeral.

After further investigation, his assassination may have happened because South Africa had been requesting his relocation. Later, information was leaked to the Rwanda supreme leader, Paul Kagame. The Burundi government tried to threaten Bihozagara’s family into signing documents ruling Bihozagara’s death to have been of natural causes, therefore immunizing the Burundi government from any responsibility for his death. Burundi currently faces pressure by human rights activists over their treatment of political prisoners.
