= United Nations Security Council Resolution 925 =

UN Security Council Resolution 925
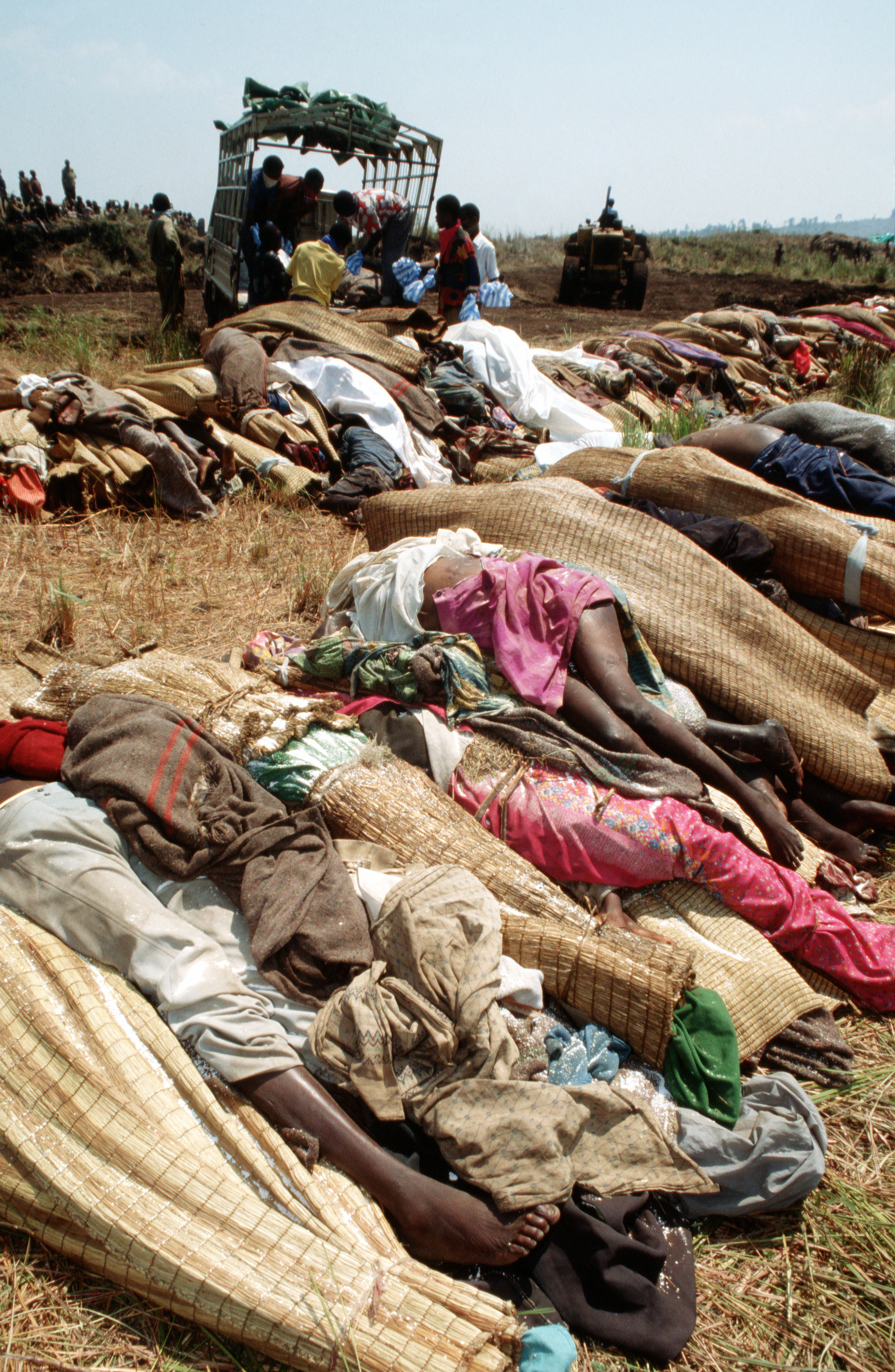
- Bodies of Rwandan refugees
- Date: 8 June 1994
- Meeting no.: 3,388
- Code: S/RES/925 (Document)
- Subject: The situation in Rwanda
- Voting summary: 15 voted for; None voted against; None abstained
- Result: Adopted

Security Council composition
- Permanent members: China; France; Russia; United Kingdom; United States
- Non-permanent members: Argentina; Brazil; Czech Republic; Djibouti; New Zealand; Nigeria; Oman; Pakistan; Rwanda; Spain

United Nations Security Council resolution 925, adopted unanimously on 8 June 1994, after reaffirming all resolutions on the situation in Rwanda, particularly resolutions 912 (1994) and 918 (1994), and Resolution 868 (1993) on the safety of United Nations peacekeepers, the council deployed additional battalions and extended the mandate of the United Nations Assistance Mission for Rwanda (UNAMIR) until 9 December 1994.

== Observations ==
The security council noted that the hostilities were still continuing, that there was no ceasefire and the violence affecting the population had not stopped. In particular, there were reports of genocide occurring. The violence and the systematic murder of thousands of civilians were severely condemned by the council, and that the perpetrators were acting with impunity. The council noted that the purpose of UNAMIR was not to act as a buffer between the two sides, and that its expanded military component will continue only as long as it is needed to protect displaced civilians, refugees and humanitarian aid workers.

The displacement of some 1.5 million Rwandans, for whom famine and disease was a risk, along with the mass exodus of refugees, was a huge humanitarian crisis. The United Nations High Commissioner for Human Rights had visited the region and a Special Rapporteur for Rwanda was appointed. The contributions of the Organisation of African Unity (OAU) and neighbouring countries was welcomed.

The resolution stressed the importance of the Arusha Accords as a basis for a peaceful solution to the conflict in Rwanda, while reaffirming the territorial integrity and unity of the country.

== Acts ==
The Council supported the recommendations of the Secretary-General Boutros Boutros-Ghali concerning the deployment of the expanded UNAMIR, principally:

(a) the deployment of two battalions for phase 2 in synchronisation with phase 1;
(b) urgent preparations for the deployment of two battalions for phase 3;
(c) the flexible implementation of all three phases.

After extending UNAMIR's mandate in mediating for a ceasefire, the Council reaffirmed that UNAMIR should:

(a) contribute towards the security of refugees and displaced persons;
(b) provide security for humanitarian workers and deliveries.

It was recognised that UNAMIR may require to take action in self-defense against persons threatening protected sites and populations and humanitarian workers. The mission was to accelerate the provision of additional troops and equipment, and support and co-operate with the Special Rapporteur.

The council demanded that all parties should end hostilities, murder and inciting ethnic hatred in the state media and agree a ceasefire. Both parties had ensured that they would co-operate with UNAMIR, particularly as it was necessary that the security of all UNAMIR's staff was assured.

The intention of the Secretary-General to establish a fund for Rwanda was welcomed. The situation in Rwanda and the role of UNAMIR were to be constantly followed, with the secretary-general being requested to report to the council no later than 9 August and 9 October 1994 on the progress of the mission, the security situation of the population, the humanitarian situation and the prospects for a ceasefire and reconciliation.

== See also ==
- History of Rwanda
- List of United Nations Security Council Resolutions 901 to 1000 (1994–1995)
- Hutu Power
- Rwandan Civil War
- Rwandan genocide
- United Nations Observer Mission Uganda–Rwanda
