= United Nations Security Council Resolution 955 =

UN Security Council Resolution 955
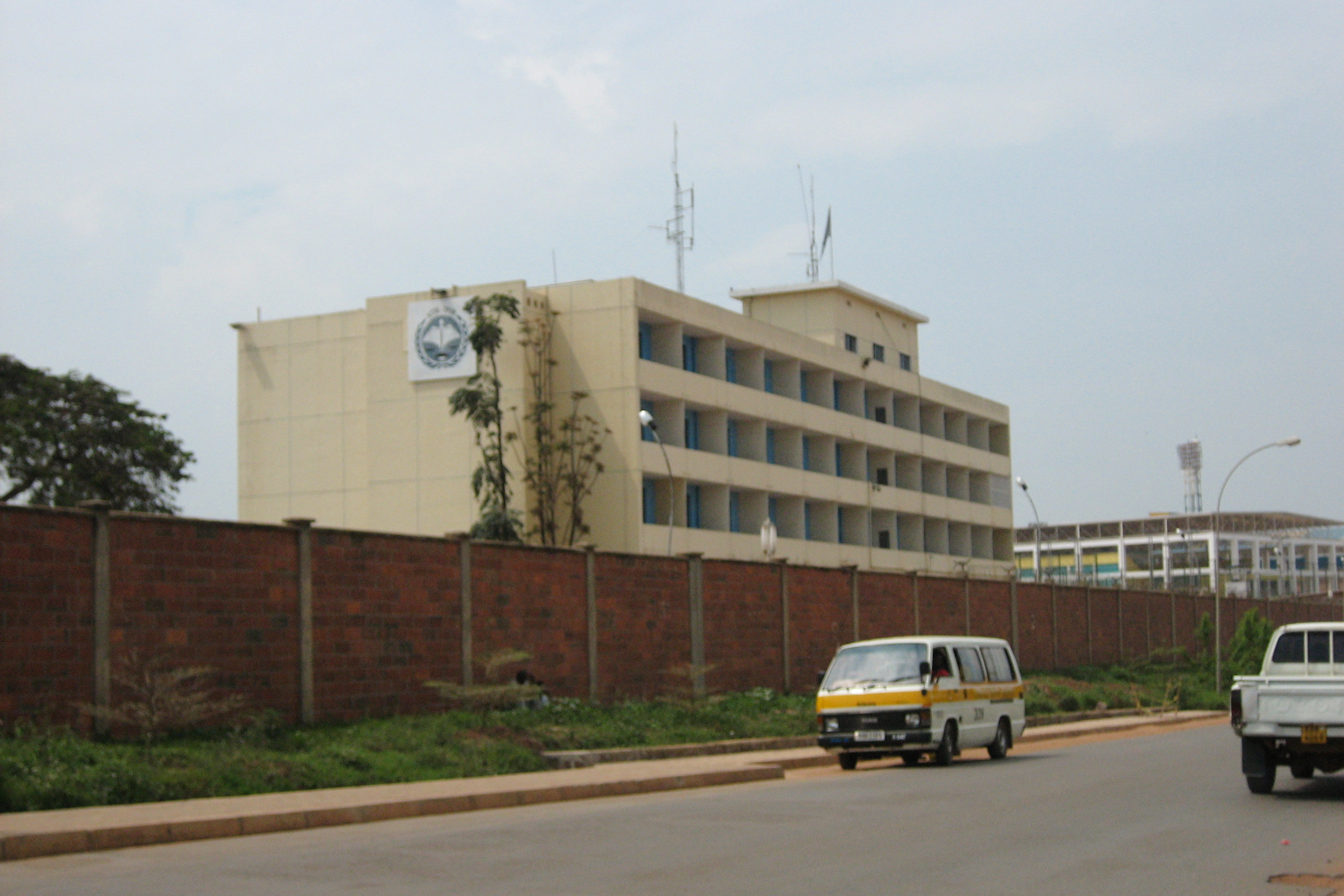
- ICTR building in the Rwandan capital Kigali
- Date: 8 November 1994
- Meeting no.: 3,453
- Subject: Rwanda
- Voting summary: 13 voted for; 1 voted against; 1 abstained
- Result: Adopted

Security Council composition
- Permanent members: China; France; Russia; United Kingdom; United States
- Non-permanent members: Argentina; Brazil; Czech Republic; Djibouti; New Zealand; Nigeria; Oman; Pakistan; Rwanda; Spain

United Nations Security Council resolution 955, adopted on 8 November 1994, after recalling all resolutions on Rwanda, the council noted that serious violations of international humanitarian law had taken place in the country and, acting under Chapter VII of the United Nations Charter, established the International Criminal Tribunal for Rwanda (ICTR).

The Security Council appreciated the work of the Commission of Experts established in Resolution 935 (1994), and expressed its concern at reports of genocide and other widespread violations of international humanitarian law had taken place in Rwanda. It stated that the situation constituted a threat to international peace and security and was determined to put an end to such crimes and bring those responsible to justice in order to restore peace. The council believed that the establishment of an international tribunal would ensure that such violations are halted and addressed. In this regard, the need for international co-operation to strengthen the judicial system in Rwanda was stressed.

The ICTR and its Statute were established after noting the request by the Government of Rwanda to create an international tribunal for the prosecution of serious violations of international humanitarian law in Rwanda between 1 January and 31 December 1994. All countries were urged to co-operate with the ICTR and its organs and to take measures under domestic law to implement the present resolution. Funds, equipment and services to the tribunal were also requested in order to support the process. The Rwandan government would be notified before decisions were taken concerning the enforcement or commutation of sentences under Articles 26 and 27 of the Statute of the International Tribunal for Rwanda.

Secretary-General Boutros Boutros-Ghali was requested to ensure the immediate implementation of the current resolution and to make arrangements for the functioning of the tribunal, including recommendations regarding the location of the ICTR. This would be determined with regard to considerations of justice and fairness as well as administrative efficiency, access to witnesses and economy. It also noted that the ICTR may meet away from its seat to discuss its functions. The council concluded by stating that the number of judges and trial chambers may be increased when necessary.

Resolution 955 was adopted by 13 votes in favour and 1 vote against from Rwanda, while China abstained from the vote, viewing the genocide as an internal matter for Rwanda.

== Rwandan rejection ==
Though Rwanda had formally requested the Security Council to set up an international tribunal, the Rwandan government opposed Resolution 955. The Rwandan delegation gave several reasons for the rejection:

1. The period covered by the tribunal, from 1 January to 31 December 1994, was inadequate and should be changed to the period of the Rwandan Civil War, from 1 October 1990 to 17 July 1994. Rwanda argued that this was necessary to include the alleged planning phase of the genocide.
2. That there were too few Trial Chamber judges, and that the tribunal should get its own Appeals Chamber and Prosecutor, as opposed to sharing those entities with the ICTY.
3. The tribunal ought to focus on the crime of genocide, instead of "dispers[ing] its energy by prosecuting crimes that come under the jurisdiction of internal tribunals."
4. That "certain countries, which need not be named here" and which "took a very active part in the civil war" should not be allowed to "propose candidates for judges and participate in their election."
5. That those prosecuted by the tribunal could be imprisoned in third countries, which would "be given the authority to reach decisions about the detainees", something that ought to be for the "International Tribunal or at least for the Rwandese people to decide."
6. That the ICTR rules out death penalty, which is provided for in the Rwandese penal code, thus creating a "disparity in sentences".
7. That the seat of the tribunal should be in Rwanda. The Rwandan delegation "was surprised to see that the authors of the draft still hesitate to indicate where the future seat of the Tribunal will be."

Despite this rejection, the Rwandan delegation claimed that "Rwanda wants and believes in an international tribunal for Rwanda".

== See also ==
- History of Rwanda
- List of United Nations Security Council Resolutions 901 to 1000 (1994–1995)
- Rwandan Civil War
- Rwandan genocide
- United Nations Observer Mission Uganda–Rwanda
