= United Nations Security Council Resolution 872 =

UN Security Council Resolution 872
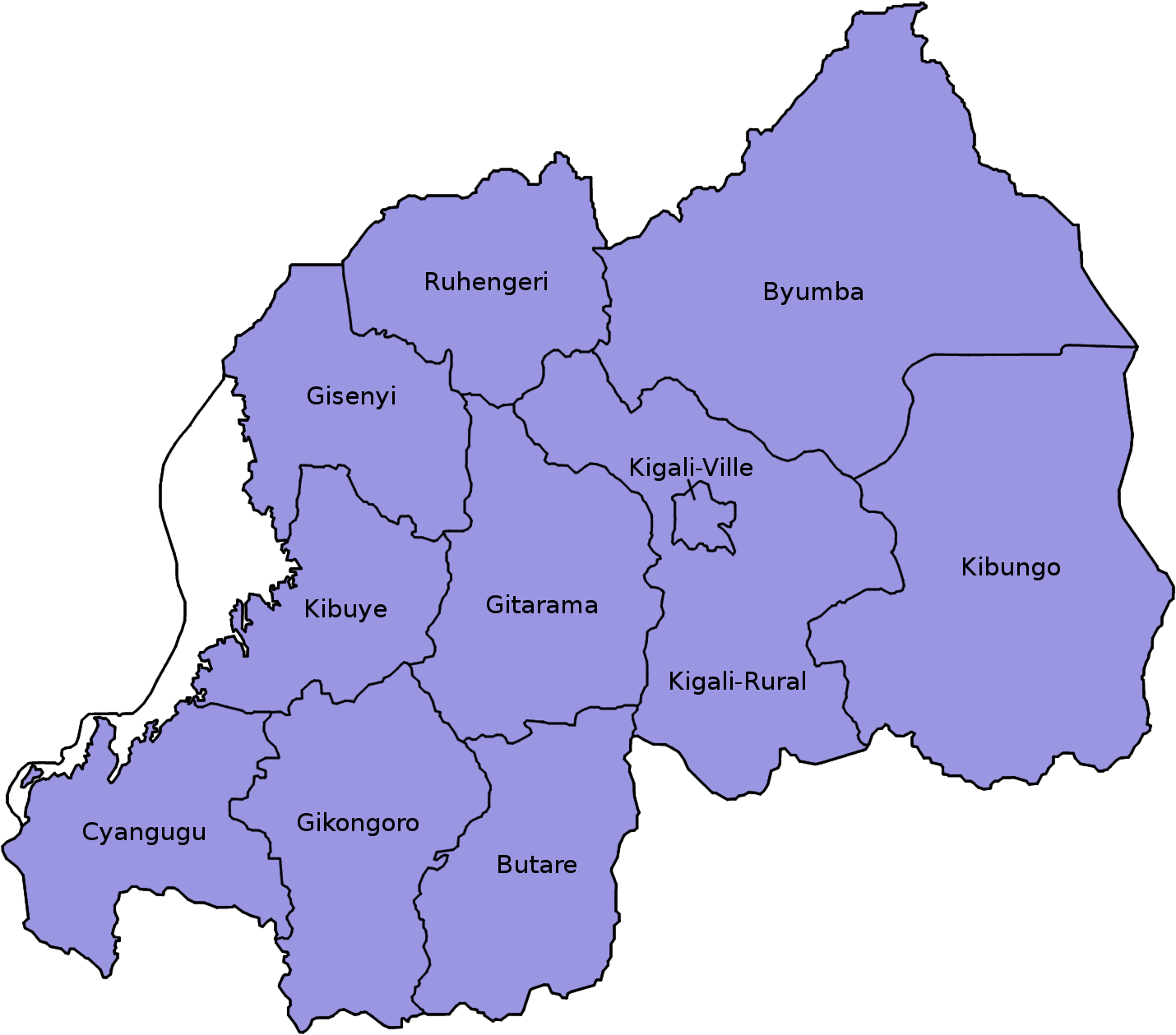
- Prefectures of Rwanda in 1993
- Date: 5 October 1993
- Meeting no.: 3,288
- Code: S/RES/872 (Document)
- Subject: The situation in Rwanda
- Voting summary: 15 voted for; None voted against; None abstained
- Result: Adopted

Security Council composition
- Permanent members: China; France; Russia; United Kingdom; United States
- Non-permanent members: Brazil; Cape Verde; Djibouti; Hungary; Japan; Morocco; New Zealand; Pakistan; Spain; Venezuela

United Nations Security Council resolution 872, adopted unanimously on 5 October 1993, after reaffirming resolutions 812 (1993) and 846 (1993) on the situation in Rwanda and Resolution 868 (1993) on the security of United Nations operations, the council stressed the need for an international force in the country and therefore established the United Nations Assistance Mission for Rwanda (UNAMIR).

== Mandate ==
The signing of the Arusha Accords was welcomed and thanks were given for the efforts of the Organisation of African Unity (OAU) and Tanzania in this respect. The conclusion of the Secretary-General Boutros Boutros-Ghali was that the full cooperation of the parties with one another is essential for the United Nations to carry out its mandate. In this regard, a peace-keeping operation named UNAMIR was established for a period of six months subject to the proviso that it would be extended beyond the initial ninety days upon a review by the council as to whether progress had been made towards the implementation of the Arusha Accords. The Security Council then decided that UNAMIR should have the following mandate:

(a) contribute to the security of Kigali;
(b) monitor the ceasefire which called for the establishment of cantonment, assembly zones and the demarcation of the new demilitarised zone;
(c) monitor the security situation during the final period of the transitional government's mandate in the lead up to elections;
(d) assist in demining;
(e) investigate non-compliance with the Arusha Accords;
(f) monitor repatriation of Rwandan refugees and resettlement of displaced persons;
(g) assist in the co-ordination of humanitarian assistance;
(h) investigate and report on incidents regarding the activities of the gendarmerie and police.

United Nations Observer Mission Uganda–Rwanda would be integrated into UNAMIR, and the council further approved Boutros-Ghali's decision stating that the deployment and withdrawal of UNAMIR should be carried out in stages, and in this connection, that UNAMIR's mandate, if extended, would be expected to terminate following national elections and the installation of a new government in Rwanda, scheduled to occur by October 1995. The secretary-general was authorised to deploy the first contingent of 2,548 troops to Kigali for an initial period of six months, allowing it to establish transitional institutions and implement other provisions of the Arusha Peace Agreement.

There he was also asked to report on the progress of UNAMIR and the requirements for its further scale and composition. It also asked him to keep the maximum strength of the mission as low as possible, for example, through a phased deployment, and planning cuts had to be considered. The Secretary-General's intention to appoint a Special Representative who would be leading the mission was welcomed. The security council asked him an agreement on the status of the transaction to close within the 30 days was to take effect.

Finally, the resolution called upon the parties to guarantee the safety of United Nations personnel and for member states, specialised agencies and non-governmental organisations to contribute economic, financial and humanitarian assistance for the people and to the democratisation of Rwanda.

== See also ==
- History of Rwanda
- List of United Nations Security Council Resolutions 801 to 900 (1993–1994)
- Rwandan Civil War
- Rwandan genocide
