= United Nations Security Council Resolution 912 =

UN Security Council Resolution 912
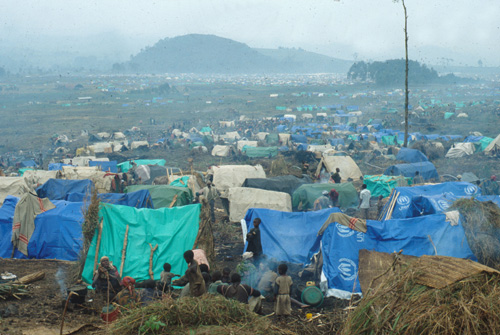
- Rwandan refugees at a camp in eastern Democratic Republic of the Congo
- Date: 21 April 1994
- Meeting no.: 3,368
- Code: S/RES/912 (Document)
- Subject: The situation in Rwanda
- Voting summary: 15 voted for; None voted against; None abstained
- Result: Adopted

Security Council composition
- Permanent members: China; France; Russia; United Kingdom; United States
- Non-permanent members: Argentina; Brazil; Czech Republic; Djibouti; New Zealand; Nigeria; Oman; Pakistan; Rwanda; Spain

United Nations Security Council resolution 912, adopted unanimously on 21 April 1994, after reaffirming all resolutions on the situation in Rwanda, particularly resolutions 872 (1993) and 909 (1994), the council expressed its alarm and condemnation of the large-scale violence in the country which resulted in the death of thousands of innocent civilians, and proposed a revised mandate of the United Nations Assistance Mission for Rwanda (UNAMIR).

The council expressed shock at the shooting down of a plane carrying the president of Rwanda Juvénal Habyarimana and president of Burundi Cyprien Ntaryamira on 6 April 1994. Following this, there was an outbreak of widespread violence in which thousands died and resulted in the displacement of a significant number of the Rwandese population both in Rwanda and neighbouring countries, and an increase in looting, banditry and breakdown of law and order. There was concern for the safety of UNAMIR and other United Nations and humanitarian personnel who were assisting in the implementation of the peace process and distributing humanitarian aid.

The security council deplored the incident in which the presidents of Rwanda and Burundi were killed and the violence which claimed the lives of the first minister, cabinet ministers, officials and thousands of civilians. Violence around Kigali and attacks on UNAMIR in particular were condemned. A ceasefire was demanded between the government of Rwanda and the Rwandan Patriotic Front (RPF) and an end to the violence engulfing the country. In this regard, the size of UNAMIR was reduced and its mandate was adjusted as follows:

(a) to mediate a ceasefire;
(b) to assist in the resumption of humanitarian relief operations;
(c) to monitor and report on developments in Rwanda, including on civilians who sought refuge with UNAMIR.

It was decided that the mandate of UNAMIR would be kept under review in light of developments and recommendations by the Secretary-General Boutros Boutros-Ghali. The Arusha Accords remained the only settlement of the conflict in Rwanda, with the Organisation of African Unity (OAU) urged to continue efforts in the peace process. The international community was called upon to continue providing humanitarian aid. Finally, the Secretary-General was requested to report on the situation with 15 days to the council.

== See also ==
- Arusha Accords
- History of Rwanda
- List of United Nations Security Council Resolutions 901 to 1000 (1994–1995)
- Rwandan Civil War
- Rwandan genocide
