= United Nations Security Council Resolution 918 =

UN Security Council Resolution 918
- Rwanda
- Date: 17 May 1994
- Meeting no.: 3,377
- Code: S/RES/918 (Document)
- Subject: The situation in Rwanda
- Result: Adopted

Security Council composition
- Permanent members: China; France; Russia; United Kingdom; United States
- Non-permanent members: Argentina; Brazil; Czech Republic; Djibouti; New Zealand; Nigeria; Oman; Pakistan; Rwanda; Spain

United Nations Security Council resolution 918 was adopted without a vote on 17 May 1994. After reaffirming all resolutions on the situation in Rwanda, particularly resolutions 872 (1993), 909 (1994) and 912 (1994), the Council expressed its alarm and condemnation at the continuing large-scale violence, and went on to impose an arms embargo on the country and authorise an expansion of the United Nations Assistance Mission for Rwanda (UNAMIR).

The security council condemned the violence and many killings of civilians in Rwanda and the impunity with which armed people were able to operate. The importance of the Arusha Accords signed in Arusha, Tanzania, was stressed and for all parties to commit to its implementation, commending the Organisation of African Unity (OAU) for its efforts in this regard. The Council stated that the thousands of deaths and large number of refugees and displaced people constituted a major humanitarian crisis with large scale violations of international humanitarian law. In this context the Council regarded the killing of members of an ethnic group with the intention of destroying such a group a crime punishable under international law. All parties were urged to cease incitement of ethnic hatred, particularly through the mass media.

Secretary-General Boutros Boutros-Ghali was requested to collect information regarding the shooting down of the plane carrying the President of Rwanda Juvénal Habyarimana and President of Burundi Cyprien Ntaryamira and violations of international humanitarian law. The urgent need for co-ordinated international action to alleviate the suffering of the Rwandan people was underlined, therefore it was desirable that the mandate of UNAMIR peacekeepers was expanded for humanitarian reasons.

Concerned that the continuation of the situation constituted a threat to international peace and security, the Council demanded an immediate end to hostilities, an agreed ceasefire and an end to the violence and carnage engulfing Rwanda. With this in mind, the mandate of UNAMIR was expanded to include:

(a) to contribute to the safety of displaced persons and refugees, and the establishment of secure humanitarian areas;
(b) to provide security during the distribution of humanitarian aid.

It was recognised that UNAMIR may also need to act in self-defense against persons threatening protected sites and populations and humanitarian workers, and authorised an increase of the force level of UNAMIR up to 5,500 troops. This would be an increase from the 444 already present. The Secretary-General had called for the redeployment of military observers currently in Nairobi, Kenya/ to Rwanda and to bring the mechanised infantry battalion up to full strength. He was also asked to report on developments in the situation concerning progress towards a ceasefire, availability of resources, the UNAMIR mandate and review of further action. Member States were requested to provide personnel to UNAMIR, while the parties in Rwanda were urged to co-operate with its mandate, ensuring its safety and freedom of movement and to treat Kigali International Airport as a neutral zone.

The council, now acting under Chapter VII of the United Nations Charter, went on to impose an arms embargo on Rwanda, banning the sale of weapons, ammunition, military vehicles and equipment, police equipment and spare parts to the country. A Committee of the Security Council was established with the following tasks:

(a) to seek information from Member States on actions they had taken to implement the embargo;
(b) to consider information on violations of the embargo and discuss ways of increasing the effectiveness of the embargo;
(c) to recommend measures against violations.

The Secretary-General was further asked as soon as possible to report on violations of humanitarian law, and in cooperation with the OAU, to continue its efforts for a peaceful solution within the Arusha peace agreement. Finally, the Council decided to keep the situation under review and anticipated a report from the Secretary-General within five weeks of the adoption of the current resolution on developments in Rwanda.

== See also ==
- History of Rwanda
- List of United Nations Security Council Resolutions 901 to 1000 (1994–1995)
- Hutu Power
- Rwandan Civil War
- Rwandan genocide
- United Nations Observer Mission Uganda–Rwanda
