= United Nations Observer Mission Uganda–Rwanda =

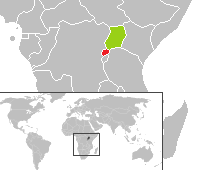
Rwanda (red) and Uganda (green)

The United Nations Observer Mission Uganda–Rwanda (UNOMUR) was a peacekeeping mission established by the United Nations Security Council in Resolution 846 and lasted from June 1993 to September 1994. Its mission was "[to] monitor the Uganda/Rwanda border to verify that no military assistance reaches Rwanda". Its headquarters was based in Kabale, Uganda, with a secondary base in Kabale. Deployed in the context of the Rwandan Civil War and subsequent peace talks held in Arusha, Tanzania, the mission was specifically tasked with ensuring that the Rwandan Patriotic Front didn't receive support from Uganda. To this end, the mission was deployed opposite the territory held by the RPF in Rwanda. This meant that they were tasked with observing around four-fifths of the border, some 120 kilometers. The 81 observers were provided by Bangladesh, Botswana, Brazil, Hungary, the Netherlands, Senegal, Slovakia and Zimbabwe.

Its chief military observer from June to October 1993 was Brigadier-General Roméo Dallaire of Canada, who later gained fame as Force Commander of the United Nations Assistance Mission for Rwanda during the Rwandan genocide. Dallaire arrived in Uganda in early October 1993, where the liaison officer from the National Resistance Army (NRA) informed him he must be informed of all UNOMUR patrols at least twelve hours in advance and that all patrols would have NRA escorts. When Dallaire protested that the whole point of the Mission was to discover suspicious activity through the element of surprise, the NRA officer insisted. Also despite the fact that Uganda had agreed that the area of verification would range 100 km inside the Ugandan border, which included the transport hub of Mbarara, the NRA insisted on a 20 km limit, putting Mbarara off limits.

Dallaire noted,

The border was a sieve, riddled with little mountain trails that had been there for millennia. Given my tiny force of eighty-one observers and the fact that we had no helicopters with night-vision capability, the task of keeping the border under surveillance was at best symbolic.

Dallaire was soon appointed head of the new mission in Rwanda and left Uganda on October 21. His replacement as chief military observer was former second-in-command Colonel Ben Matiwaza of Zimbabwe, and later Colonel Asrarul Haque of Bangladesh.

UNOMUR would later be placed under the command of UNAMIR. Following the genocide and outbreak of the Rwandan Civil War, its mandate ended on September 21, 1994.
