= United Nations Security Council Resolution 1437 =

UN Security Council Resolution 1437
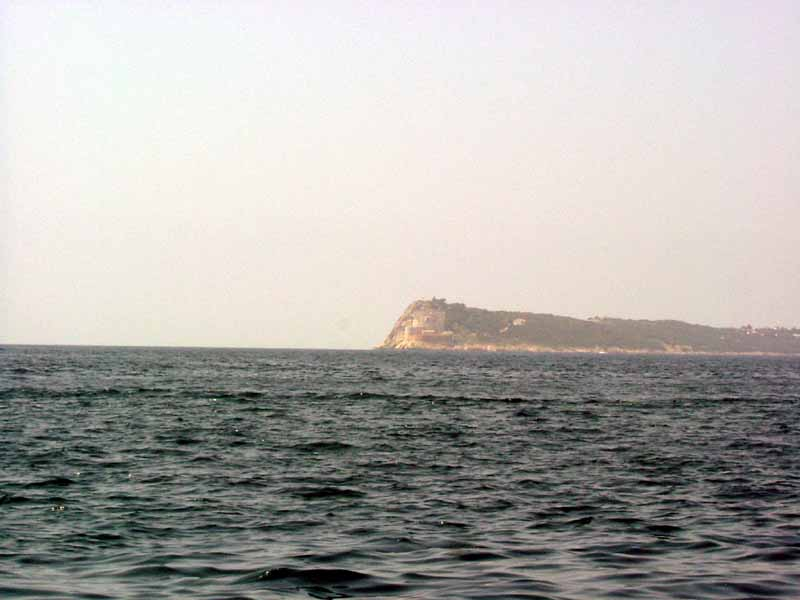
- Prevlaka peninsula area
- Date: 11 October 2002
- Meeting no.: 4,622
- Code: S/RES/1437 (Document)
- Subject: The situation in Croatia
- Voting summary: 15 voted for; None voted against; None abstained
- Result: Adopted

Security Council composition
- Permanent members: China; France; Russia; United Kingdom; United States
- Non-permanent members: Bulgaria; Cameroon; Colombia; Guinea; Ireland; Mauritius; Mexico; Norway; Singapore; Syria

United Nations Security Council resolution 1437, adopted unanimously on 11 October 2002, after recalling previous resolutions on Croatia, including resolutions 779 (1992), 981 (1995), 1088 (1996), 1147 (1998), 1183 (1998), 1222 (1999), 1252 (1999), 1285 (2000), 1307 (2000), 1357 (2001), 1362 (2001), 1387 (2002) and 1424 (2002), the council authorised the United Nations Mission of Observers in Prevlaka (UNMOP) to continue monitoring the demilitarisation in the Prevlaka peninsula area of Croatia for a final two months until 15 December 2002.

The security council welcomed the calm and stable situation on the Prevlaka peninsula. It noted that the presence of UNMOP contributed greatly to maintaining conditions conducive to a settlement of the dispute and welcomed that Croatia and the Federal Republic of Yugoslavia (Serbia and Montenegro) were making progress in the normalisation of their relations.

Extending UNMOP's mandate for a final time, Secretary-General Kofi Annan was asked to make preparations for its termination including a reduction in its size and adjusting its activities. It reiterated calls on both parties to cease violations of the demilitarisation regime, co-operate with United Nations observers and to ensure full freedom of movement to the observers. Secretary-General Kofi Annan was requested to report to the Council on the completion of UNMOP's mandate, which would be shortened upon request from the parties.

Finally, both parties were urged to intensify efforts towards a negotiated settlement of the Prevlaka dispute in accordance with their 1996 Agreement of Normalization of Relations.

== See also ==
- Breakup of Yugoslavia
- Croatian War of Independence
- List of United Nations Security Council Resolutions 1401 to 1500 (2002–2003)
- Yugoslav Wars
