= United Nations Security Council Resolution 1424 =

UN Security Council Resolution 1424
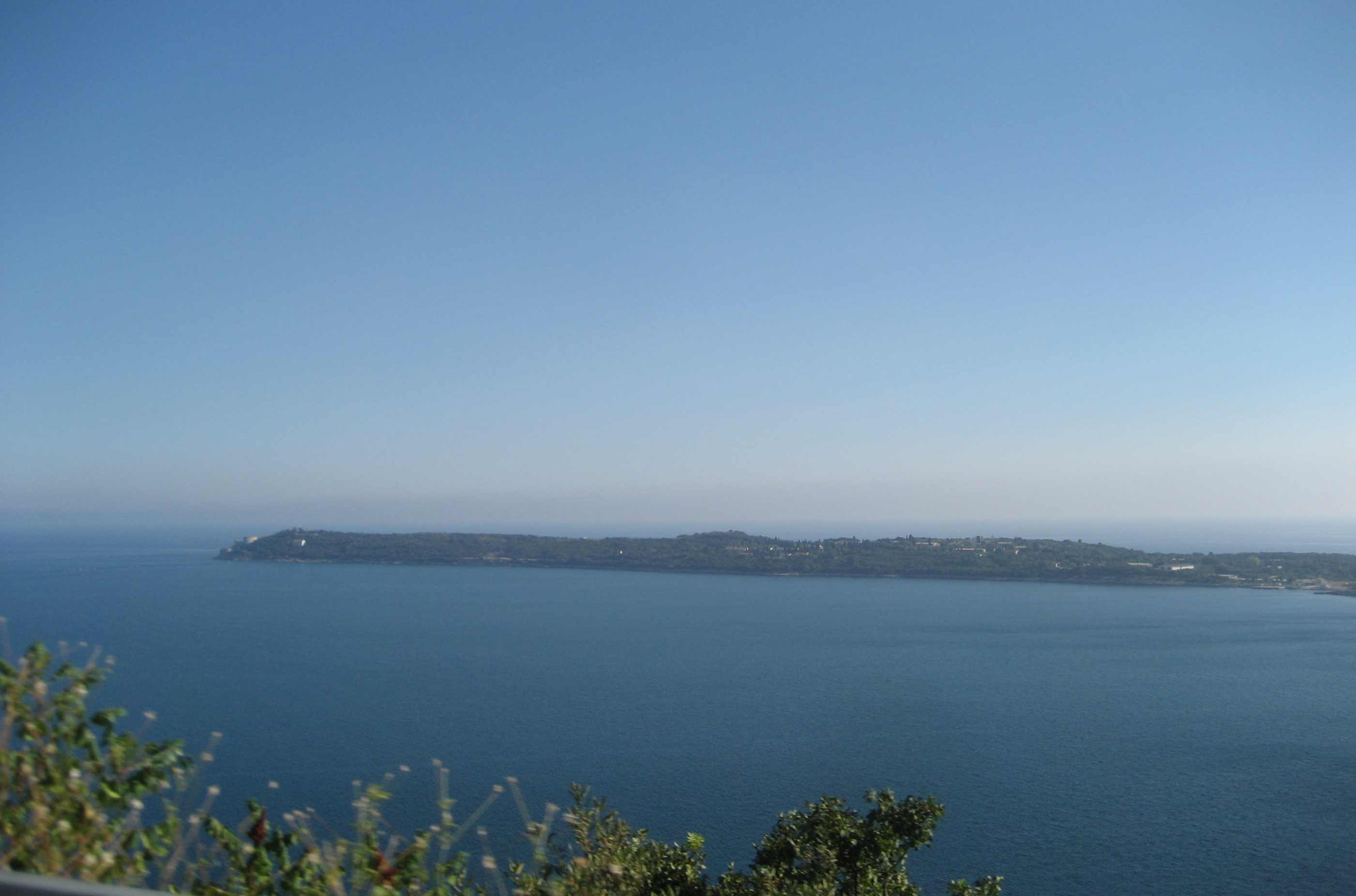
- Prevlaka peninsula area
- Date: 12 July 2002
- Meeting no.: 4,574
- Code: S/RES/1424 (Document)
- Subject: The situation in Croatia
- Voting summary: 15 voted for; None voted against; None abstained
- Result: Adopted

Security Council composition
- Permanent members: China; France; Russia; United Kingdom; United States
- Non-permanent members: Bulgaria; Cameroon; Colombia; Guinea; Ireland; Mauritius; Mexico; Norway; Singapore; Syria

United Nations Security Council resolution 1424, adopted unanimously on 12 July 2002, after recalling previous resolutions on Croatia, including resolutions 779 (1992), 981 (1995), 1088 (1996), 1147 (1998), 1183 (1998), 1222 (1999), 1252 (1999), 1285 (2000), 1307 (2000), 1357 (2001), 1362 (2001) and 1387 (2002), the council authorised the United Nations Mission of Observers in Prevlaka (UNMOP) to continue monitoring the demilitarisation in the Prevlaka peninsula area of Croatia for three months until 15 October 2002.

The security council welcomed the calm and stable situation on the Prevlaka peninsula and was encouraged to learn that both Croatia and the Federal Republic of Yugoslavia had agreed to establish a Border Commission. It noted that the presence of UNMOP contributed greatly to maintaining conditions conducive to a settlement of the dispute.

The resolution welcomed that Croatia and the Federal Republic of Yugoslavia (Serbia and Montenegro) were making progress in the normalisation of their relations. It urged both parties to cease violations of the demilitarisation regime, co-operate with United Nations observers and to ensure full freedom of movement to the observers. The Secretary-General Kofi Annan was requested to report to the council by 15 October 2002. Both parties were urged to intensify efforts towards a negotiated settlement of the Prevlaka dispute; the duration of UNMOP's mandate would be reviewed if the parties informed the Council that a settlement had been reached.

== See also ==
- Breakup of Yugoslavia
- Croatian War of Independence
- List of United Nations Security Council Resolutions 1401 to 1500 (2002–2003)
- Yugoslav Wars
