= United Nations Security Council Resolution 1387 =

UN Security Council Resolution 1387
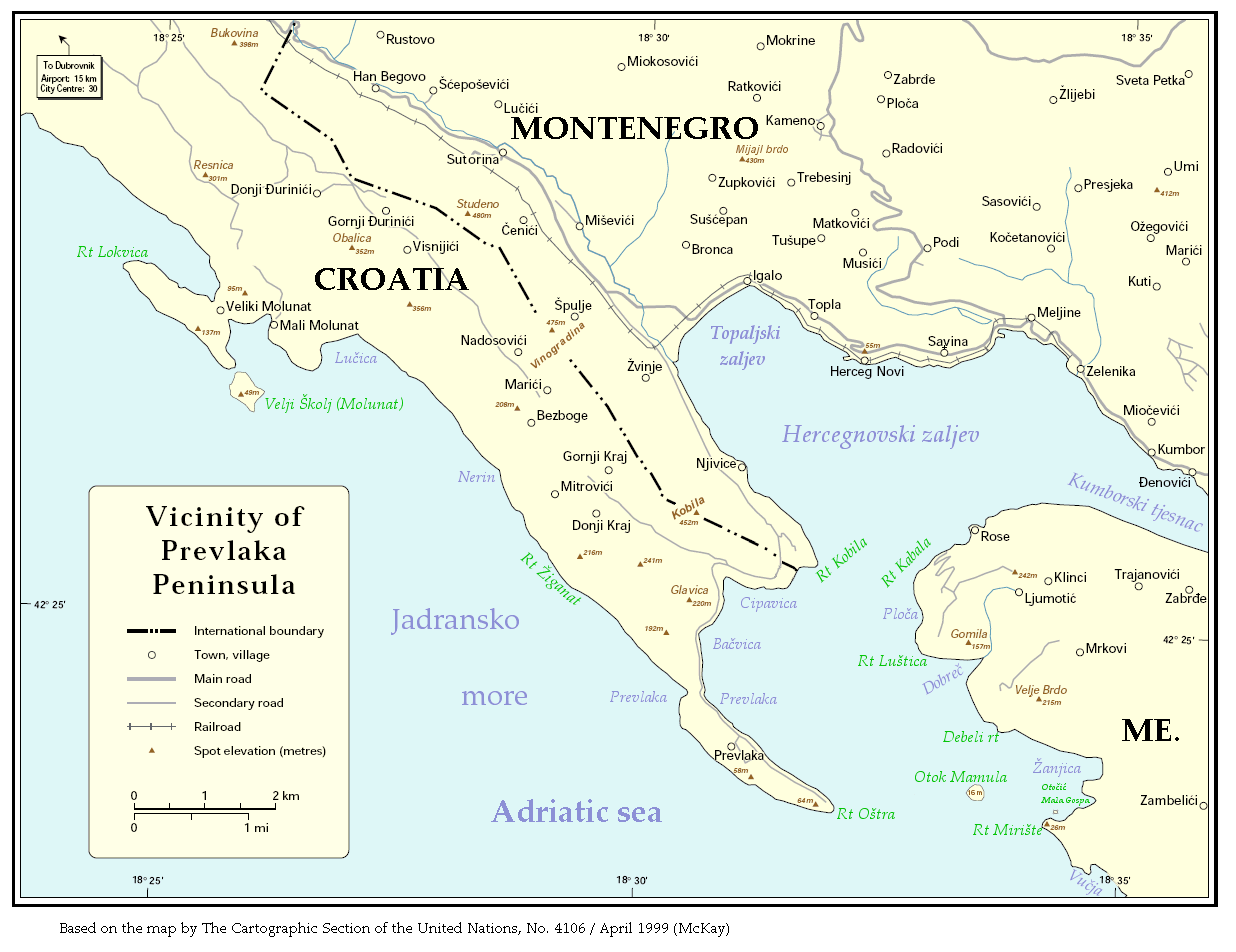
- Prevlaka peninsula area
- Date: 15 January 2002
- Meeting no.: 4,448
- Code: S/RES/1387 (Document)
- Subject: The situation in Croatia
- Voting summary: 15 voted for; None voted against; None abstained
- Result: Adopted

Security Council composition
- Permanent members: China; France; Russia; United Kingdom; United States
- Non-permanent members: Bulgaria; Cameroon; Colombia; Guinea; Ireland; Mauritius; Mexico; Norway; Singapore; Syria

United Nations Security Council resolution 1387, adopted unanimously on 15 January 2002, after recalling previous resolutions on Croatia, including resolutions 779 (1992), 981 (1995), 1088 (1996), 1147 (1998), 1183 (1998), 1222 (1999), 1252 (1999), 1285 (2000), 1307 (2000), 1357 (2001) and 1362 (2001), the Council authorised the United Nations Mission of Observers in Prevlaka (UNMOP) to continue monitoring the demilitarisation in the Prevlaka peninsula area of Croatia for six months until 15 July 2002. It was the first Security Council resolution adopted in 2002.

The Security Council welcomed the calm and stable situation on the Prevlaka peninsula and was encouraged to learn that both Croatia and the Federal Republic of Yugoslavia had agreed to establish a Border Commission. It noted that the presence of UNMOP contributed greatly to maintaining conditions conducive to a settlement of the dispute.

The resolution welcomed that Croatia and the Federal Republic of Yugoslavia (Serbia and Montenegro) were making progress in the normalisation of their relations. It urged both parties to cease violations of the demilitarisation regime, co-operate with United Nations observers and to ensure full freedom of movement to the observers. Both countries were called upon to implement confidence-building measures from Resolution 1252 and to report on the progress of their bilateral negotiations at least twice a month. Finally, the Stabilisation Force, authorised in Resolution 1088 and extended by Resolution 1357, was required to co-operate with UNMOP.

Croatia had asked for the mission to be suspended to allow more time for both countries to settle their differences, while Montenegro favoured a longer mandate.

== See also ==
- Breakup of Yugoslavia
- Croatian War of Independence
- List of United Nations Security Council Resolutions 1301 to 1400 (2000–2002)
- Yugoslav Wars
