= United Nations Security Council Resolution 1362 =

UN Security Council Resolution 1362
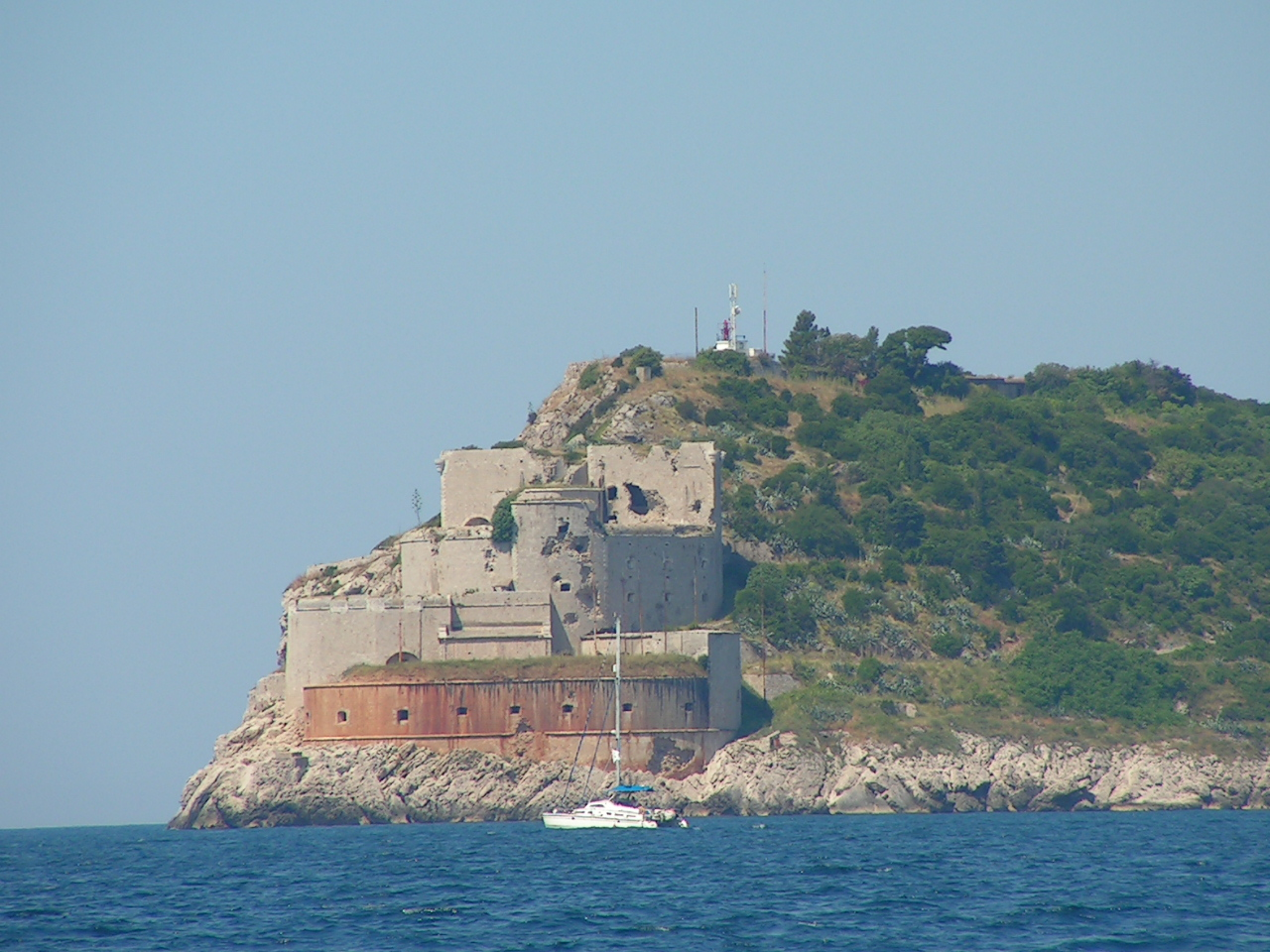
- Prevlaka peninsula area
- Date: 11 July 2001
- Meeting no.: 4,346
- Code: S/RES/1362 (Document)
- Subject: The situation in Croatia
- Voting summary: 15 voted for; None voted against; None abstained
- Result: Adopted

Security Council composition
- Permanent members: China; France; Russia; United Kingdom; United States
- Non-permanent members: Bangladesh; Colombia; Ireland; Jamaica; Mali; Mauritius; Norway; Singapore; Tunisia; Ukraine

United Nations Security Council resolution 1362, adopted unanimously on 11 July 2001, after recalling previous resolutions on Croatia, including resolutions 779 (1992), 981 (1995), 1088 (1996), 1147 (1998), 1183 (1998), 1222 (1999), 1252 (1999), 1285 (2000), 1307 (2000) and 1357 (2001), the Council authorised the United Nations Mission of Observers in Prevlaka (UNMOP) to continue monitoring the demilitarisation in the Prevlaka peninsula area of Croatia for six months until 15 January 2002.

The Security Council welcomed the generally calm and stable situation on the Prevlaka peninsula but remained concerned at violations of the demilitarisation regime and limitations on the freedom of movement of United Nations observers. It welcomed the opening of the crossing points between Croatia and Montenegro facilitating civilian and commercial traffic without security incidents that represented a significant confidence-building measure between the two countries. There was still concern at the lack of progress towards a settlement of the disputed Prevlaka peninsula issue and a demining programme. The resolution noted that the presence of UNMOP contributed greatly to maintaining conditions conducive to a settlement of the dispute.

Both Croatia and the Federal Republic of Yugoslavia (Serbia and Montenegro) were urged to fully implement an agreement on the normalisation of their relations, cease violations of the demilitarisation regime, reduce tension and to ensure freedom of movement to United Nations observers. The Council welcomed the resumption of discussions between the two parties. Both countries were called upon to implement confidence-building measures from Resolution 1252 and to report on the progress of their bilateral negotiations at least twice a month.

Finally, the Stabilisation Force, authorised in Resolution 1088 and extended by Resolution 1357, was required to co-operate with UNMOP.

== See also ==
- Breakup of Yugoslavia
- Croatian War of Independence
- List of United Nations Security Council Resolutions 1301 to 1400 (2000–2002)
- Yugoslav Wars
