= United Nations Confidence Restoration Operation in Croatia =

United Nations peacekeeping mission in Croatia

- Abbreviation: UNCRO
- Formation: 31 March 1995
- Type: Peacekeeping mission
- Legal status: Completed on 15 January 1996
- Head: Byung Suk Min (head of the mission, from July 1995); Raymond Crabbe (UNCRO commander, until July 1995); Eid Kamal Al-Rodan (UNCRO commander, from July 1995)
- Parent organization: United Nations Security Council
- Website: https://www.un.org/en/peacekeeping/missions/past/uncro.htm

The United Nations Confidence Restoration Operation in Croatia, commonly abbreviated UNCRO, was a United Nations (UN) peacekeeping mission in Croatia. It was established under Chapter VII of the United Nations Charter and approved by the UN Security Council (UNSC) Resolution 981 on 31 March 1995. UNCRO inherited personnel and infrastructure from the United Nations Protection Force (UNPROFOR). Its command was located in Zagreb; the peacekeeping troops were deployed in four sectors named North, South, East, and West. Twenty different countries contributed troops to the mission.

UNCRO started with more than 15,000 troops taken over from UNPROFOR; the personnel count was gradually reduced to approximately 7,000 by the end of the mission in early 1996. South Korean diplomat Byung Suk Min was the civilian head of the mission, while the military commanders of UNCRO were Generals Raymond Crabbe and Eid Kamal Al-Rodan. UNCRO was linked with UNPROFOR, which remained active in Bosnia and Herzegovina, and with the United Nations Preventive Deployment Force (UNPREDEP), which was deployed in the Republic of Macedonia. The mission was terminated on 15 January 1996 by UNSC Resolution 1025, passed on 30 November 1995. Sixteen UNCRO troops were killed, including four during Operation Storm in August 1995.

UNCRO was tasked with upholding the March 1994 ceasefire in the Croatian War of Independence, supporting an agreement on economic cooperation between Croatia and the self-declared Republic of Serbian Krajina (RSK), monitoring areas between opposing armies, monitoring the demilitarised Prevlaka peninsula, undertaking liaison functions, delivering humanitarian aid, and occupying 25 checkpoints along Croatia's international borders between RSK-held territory, the Federal Republic of Yugoslavia, and Bosnia and Herzegovina. UNCRO, like the UNPROFOR mission before it, was criticised for lacking sufficient troops and adequate resources to carry out the mission, and fulfilment of the mission's mandate proved nearly impossible.

== Background ==
UNCRO Sectors in Croatia: North South West East

In 1990, following the electoral defeat of the Communist regime in Croatia, ethnic tensions worsened. After the elections, the Yugoslav People's Army (Jugoslovenska narodna armija, or JNA) confiscated the weapons of Croatia's Territorial Defence Force (Teritorijalna obrana, or TO) to minimise any resistance. On 17 August 1990, the tensions escalated to an open revolt of the Croatian Serbs, centred on the predominantly Serb-populated areas of the Dalmatian hinterland around Knin, and parts of the Lika, Kordun, Banovina and eastern Croatia regions. The Republic of Serbian Krajina (RSK), later established in those areas, declared its intention to integrate with Serbia, and was viewed by the Government of Croatia as a breakaway region. The JNA prevented Croatian police from intervening. By March 1991, the conflict had escalated into the Croatian War of Independence. In June, Croatia declared independence as Yugoslavia disintegrated, but implementation of the decision was postponed until 8 October by a three-month moratorium. A campaign of ethnic cleansing then began in the RSK; most non-Serbs were expelled by early 1993.

As the JNA increasingly supported the RSK, the Croatian police could not cope with the situation. In May 1991, the Croatian National Guard (Zbor narodne garde, or ZNG) was formed as the military of Croatia and was renamed the Croatian Army (Hrvatska vojska, or HV) in November. Late 1991 saw the fiercest fighting of the war, culminating in the Battle of the Barracks, the siege of Dubrovnik, and the Battle of Vukovar. In January 1992, a ceasefire agreement to implement the Vance plan was signed by representatives of Croatia, the JNA, and the UN, and fighting paused. The Vance plan was designed to stop hostilities in Croatia and allow negotiations by neutralizing any influence caused by fighting, but offered no political solutions in advance. The plan entailed deployment of the 10,000-person United Nations Protection Force (UNPROFOR) to the major conflict areas known as "UN Protected Areas" (UNPAs). UNPROFOR was tasked with creating a buffer between the belligerents, disarming Croatian Serb elements of the TO, overseeing JNA and HV withdrawal from the UNPAs, and return of refugees to the area. United Nations Security Council Resolution 743 of 21 February 1992 described the legal basis of the UN mission that had been requested and agreed upon in November 1991, and made no explicit reference to Chapter VI or Chapter VII of the United Nations Charter. Only a reference to Chapter VII would have permitted the peacekeeping force to enforce its mandate regardless of the level of cooperation of the belligerents.

Because of organisational problems and breaches of the ceasefire agreement, UNPROFOR did not start to deploy until 8 March and took two months to fully deploy in the UNPAs. Even though UNPROFOR had placed most heavy weapons of the Army of the Republic of Serb Krajina (ARSK) in storage controlled jointly by the UN and the RSK by January 1993, the force was unable to fulfil all of the provisions of the Vance plan, including disarmament of the ARSK, the return of refugees, restoration of civilian authority, and the establishment of an ethnically integrated police. It also failed to remove ARSK forces from areas outside the designated UNPAs which were under ARSK control at the time the ceasefire had been signed. Those areas, later known as the "pink zones", were supposed to be restored to Croatian control from the outset. Failure to implement this aspect of the Vance plan made the pink zones a major source of contention between Croatia and the RSK. In 1993, worried that the situation on the ground might become permanent, Croatia launched several small-scale military offensives against the RSK to seize significant local objectives and attract international attention. In response, the ARSK retrieved their weapons from the UN/RSK-controlled storage sites, reversing the only major success of UNPROFOR in Croatia.

== Transition from UNPROFOR to UNCRO ==
The UNPROFOR mandate was extended several times, in increments of up to six months, with consent of the government of Croatia. That changed in early 1995, when Croatian President Franjo Tuđman wrote to the Secretary-General of the United Nations informing him that Croatia would not accept further extensions of the mission once it expired on 31 March and asking that UNPROFOR leave Croatia by the end of June. At the time, it was established UN practice to seek consent of the country where its peacekeepers were deployed, and the letter effectively required UNPROFOR to withdraw completely from Croatia. Such action would also require abolishment of the UNPAs, which had been identified as integral parts of Croatia by United Nations Security Council Resolution 815 of 30 March 1993. Two days later, the Secretary-General reported to the United Nations Security Council (UNSC) that UNPROFOR was unable to implement important elements of the Vance plan, enforce a ceasefire, or protect its own vehicles against hijackings in the UNPAs.

On 31 January, US ambassador Peter Galbraith unsuccessfully tried to persuade Tuđman's aide Hrvoje Šarinić to accept another extension of the UNPROFOR mandate, explaining that the conflict would inevitably escalate once the UN force withdrew. This rebuff was followed by harsh French and UK diplomatic responses calling on the UN to ignore the Croatian decision, which resulted in Tuđman dismissing any extension of the mandate. The US Assistant Secretary of State for European and Eurasian Affairs, Richard Holbrooke, met Tuđman and suggested to him that if UNPROFOR was permitted to stay, Croatia could count on integration into the European Union and NATO. As a way out of the diplomatic row, Holbrooke proposed that UNPROFOR be replaced by a new mission using the same personnel and organisational structure. Following Croatian agreement, the UNSC adopted Resolution 981 establishing the United Nations Confidence Restoration Operation in Croatia (UNCRO), replacing UNPROFOR in the country. The new mission's name was devised by Under-Secretary-General of the United Nations Shashi Tharoor.

== Mission ==
=== Mandate and functions ===
The UNCRO mission was established under Chapter VII of the United Nations Charter. It was initially scheduled to end on 30 November 1995, and its mandate was to support implementation of a ceasefire agreed to by Croatia and the RSK on 29 March 1994, as well as an agreement on economic cooperation made on 2 December 1994. The former entailed monitoring areas between HV and ARSK forward positions, verification that specific types of heavy weapons were at least 10 or 20 kilometres (6.2 or 12.4 miles) away from the forward military positions or placed in storage, maintenance of checkpoints, chairing Joint Commissions, and performance of liaison functions. The economic functions were supporting negotiation and implementation of further economic arrangements and facilitating and supporting activities aimed at opening of transport routes and power and water supply networks.

UNCRO was also tasked with delivery of humanitarian aid and control, monitoring, and reporting of any transport of military personnel, supplies, equipment, or weapons across UNCRO-staffed border checkpoints between RSK-held parts of Croatia on one side and Bosnia and Herzegovina or the Federal Republic of Yugoslavia on the other. There were 25 border checkpoints occupied and guarded by UNCRO. The mandate also directed UNCRO to monitor demilitarisation of the Prevlaka Peninsula at the entrance to the Bay of Kotor, according to the UNSC Resolution 779. Deployment of UNCRO was formally approved by the UNSC on 28 April. The mission was scheduled to be scaled down in June to 8,750 troops from the larger UNPROFOR force in the country.

UNCRO was criticised for several reasons. The Secretary-General's Report to the Council described the failures of UNPROFOR, but the new mission did not address them. There were insufficient troops, having been reduced from UNPROFOR levels by the new mission mandate, and inadequate human and material resources to carry out the mission tasks. As a result, fulfilment of the mission mandate was nearly impossible. While Croatian sources said that the mission name was the only real difference from UNPROFOR, the RSK authorities were not satisfied with the UNCRO mission. Specifically, the RSK objected to the deployment of UNCRO troops along the international borders and to the mission name. Conversely, Croats were pleased that the mission acronym appeared to be an abbreviation of Croatia. In response, Czech UNCRO troops used vehicle licence plates bearing the new mission's acronym when operating in HV-controlled territory and UNPROFOR plates in areas held by the ARSK due to safety concerns.

UNSC resolutions relevant to UNCRO
UNSC Resolution	Date	Notes
981	31 March 1995	Establishment of UNCRO
990	28 April 1995	Deployment of UNCRO
994	17 May 1995	Implementation of UNCRO mission following Operation Flash
1025	30 November 1995	Termination of UNCRO

=== Order of battle ===
UNCRO was commanded from UN Peace Force Headquarters (UNPF-HQ) established in Zagreb. UNPF-HQ controlled UNCRO, the United Nations Preventive Deployment Force (UNPREDEP) in the Republic of Macedonia, and UNPROFOR—which was confined to Bosnia and Herzegovina from late March. The UNPF-HQ commander was French Lieutenant General Bernard Janvier. In July, South Korean diplomat Byung Suk Min was appointed as head of UNCRO, with Major General Eid Kamal Al-Rodan of the Royal Jordanian Army as the mission's military commander. Before Al-Rodan, the post was held by Canadian Lieutenant General Raymond Crabbe. UNCRO was initially deployed to the same parts of Croatia as UNPROFOR, however contemporary UNSC documents no longer referred to them as UNPAs—applying the designations of Sector East, West, North, and South, or "areas under the control of the local Serb authorities" instead. One group of sources refers to the areas of UNCRO deployment as UNPAs, another reflects the UNSC practice and omits the acronym, while others refer to the areas as "former UNPAs".

Troops from Argentina, Belgium, Canada, Czech Republic, Denmark, Finland, France, Germany, Indonesia, Jordan, Kenya, Nepal, Netherlands, Norway, Poland, Russia, Slovakia, Sweden, Ukraine, and the United States contributed to the mission. When UNCRO replaced UNPROFOR in Croatia in March 1995, there were 15,229 UN troops—including UNPF-HQ personnel—in Croatia. By mid-November, the mission had been scaled down to 7,041 personnel, including 164 UN Military Observers and 296 UN Civilian Police (UNCIVPOL) personnel.

UNCRO order of battle on 17 November 1995
Deployment	Component	Personnel (November 1995)	Personnel (March 1995)	Notes
Headquarters		336	404	Includes 39 UNMO and 26 UNCIVPOL personnel (November); Located in Zagreb
Garrison command		26	404	Includes 19 UNIVPOL personnel (November); Located in Zagreb
Garrison command		14	404	Includes 4 UNCIVPOL personnel (November); Located in Split
Garrison command		6	404	Located in Ploče
Sector East	Belgium	693	769	Infantry
Sector East	Russia	912	856	Infantry
Sector East	Slovakia	590	567	Engineer battalion (support unit, deployed to the Sector East)
Sector East	UNMO	48		
Sector East	UNCIVPOL	16		
Former Sector North	Denmark	119	953	Infantry
Former Sector North	Poland	461	1,141	Infantry
Former Sector North	Ukraine	5	555	Infantry
Former Sector North	Jordan	6	see note	Infantry; Jordan deployed 3,283 troops to multiple sectors in Croatia in March 1995
Former Sector North	UNMO	31		
Former Sector North	UNCIVPOL	61		
Former Sector South	Canada	9	1,218	Operation Harmony; 2nd Battalion of the Royal 22nd Regiment replaced the 1st Battalion of The Royal Canadian Regiment in mid-April 1995; Deployed to the Sector South; Deployment formally ended on 17 October 1995
Former Sector South	Czech Republic	523	957	2nd Peacekeeping Battalion of the Czech Republic; Scaled down to 130 troops by mid-January 1996; Commanded by the Lieutenant Colonel Ľudovít Cirok
Former Sector South	Kenya	2	974	Infantry battalion deployed with UNPROFOR pulled out and replaced by military observers
Former Sector South	Jordan	6	see note	Infantry; Jordan deployed 3,283 troops to multiple sectors in Croatia in March 1995
Former Sector South	UNMO	34		
Former Sector South	UNCIVPOL	71		
Former Sector West	Nepal	165	898	Infantry
Former Sector West	Argentina	0	862	Infantry
Former Sector West	Jordan	0	see note	Infantry; Jordan deployed 3,283 troops to multiple sectors in Croatia in March 1995, including the Sector West
Former Sector West	UNMO	12		
Former Sector West	UNCIVPOL	99		
Support units	Canada	450	0	Designated as a support unit in November 1995, deployed to the Sector South in March 1995
Support units	Denmark	11	?	Logistic contingent; March 1995 troop size included in the Sector North deployment
Support units	France	828	843	Logistics battalion
Support units	Finland	39	43	Finguard HQ
Support units	Indonesia	236	220	Medical battalion
Support units	Netherlands	78	148	Logistic base
Support units	Norway	114	111	Movement control unit
Support units	Sweden	100	128	HQ company
Support units	United States	361	299	Field hospital, located in Zagreb; Part of the Operation Provide Promise
Support units	Ukraine	60	555	Helicopter unit
Support units	Germany	519	0	Field hospital, located in Trogir to support UNPROFOR in Bosnia and Herzegovina
TOTAL		7,041	15,229	

=== Response to Croatian offensives ===
On 1 May, HV launched Operation Flash and overran the ARSK-held part of Sector West in the course of few days. Šarinić warned Crabbe of the attack hours in advance to allow UNCRO troops to seek shelter. The RSK authorities said that some ARSK units were not able to remove antitank weapons from UNCRO depots in Stara Gradiška and near Pakrac until after the offensive began. These weapons had been stored there pursuant to the March 1994 ceasefire agreement. Nonetheless, UNCRO did not stop ARSK troops from retrieving the weapons. During the fighting, ARSK troops took 15 UNCIVPOL members, two interpreters, and 89 Nepalese and Argentinean troops hostage to use as human shields against the HV. HV troops hijacked an UNCRO armoured personnel carrier and a Land Rover to precede HV tanks that were moving west along the A3 motorway. On 3 May, the Argentinean battalion of UNCRO facilitated the surrender of 600 ARSK troops near Pakrac, following an agreement reached between Croatia and the RSK which was mediated by Yasushi Akashi, the personal representative of the UN Secretary-General. During Operation Flash, three Jordanian UNCRO troops were wounded by HV fire. The offensive made clear that the deployment of UNCRO would not deter further Croatian offensives.

On 4 August, the HV initiated Operation Storm, which was aimed at recapturing Sectors North and South, which encompassed the bulk of the RSK. UNCRO was notified three hours in advance of the attack, when Šarinić made a phone call with Janvier. In addition, each HV corps notified the UNCRO sector in the path of its planned advance, and requested written confirmation that the information had been received. UNCRO relayed the information to the RSK authorities. Two days later, UNCRO was requested to protect 35,000 Serb civilians accompanying the ARSK as it retreated towards Bosnia and Herzegovina. They were trapped near Topusko when HV troops captured Glina, closing the last road available to them. The UNCRO Ukrainian battalion base was used as a venue for negotiations for the surrender of the trapped ARSK Kordun Corps; the negotiations were conducted in the presence of UNCRO officers. The commander of UNCRO Sector North signed the surrender agreement as a witness. This offensive also involved actions against UN peacekeepers; the Army of the Republic of Bosnia and Herzegovina, which supported the offensive from the Bihać pocket, attacked UNCRO observation posts defended by Polish troops, while HV troops used several Danish peacekeepers as human shields. During the offensive, ARSK detained five Sector East headquarters staff, several UNCRO vehicles were hijacked, and UN personnel were harassed. Four UN peacekeepers were killed in the offensive—three as a result of HV actions, and one as a result of ARSK fire—and 16 were injured. HV troops also destroyed 98 UN observation posts.

Following the two offensives and negotiations led by Akashi, UNCRO continued to supervise the ceasefire in Sector East. The role of UNCRO in Sectors North and South was limited to post-conflict peace-building following an agreement between Croatian authorities and Akashi. By November 1995, UNCRO had withdrawn to Sector East. Even though the UN had planned to reduce UNCRO to 4,190 troops by the end of September, and to approximately 2,500 by October, the mission strength remained at more than 7,000 troops until November.

== Termination and aftermath ==
The UNCRO mission was ended by UNSC Resolution 1025, passed on 30 November 1995. The resolution was passed in the wake of the Erdut Agreement between Croatia and representatives of Serbs in Sector East. It defined mechanisms for peaceful restoration of the region to Croatian control and established an interim period ending on 15 January 1996, when authority was to be transferred from UNCRO to a new transitional force to be deployed to the area. When the interim period expired, the UNSC adopted resolutions 1037 and 1038, which established the United Nations Transitional Administration for Eastern Slavonia, Baranja and Western Sirmium in the former Sector East and the United Nations Mission of Observers in Prevlaka. Commencement of the two new missions coincided with NATO's arrival in Bosnia and Herzegovina to enforce the Dayton Accords.

Sixteen UNCRO personnel died during the mission: three Kenyan soldiers were killed; the Czech, Danish, French, and Russian battalions lost two each; and the Argentinean, Belgian, Jordanian, Polish, and Ukrainian contingents each lost one. Four of the UNCRO peacekeepers were killed during major combat in the mission area.

The United Nations Medal was awarded to troops who served with UNCRO for at least 90 consecutive days. The medal was issued suspended from a ribbon 35 millimetres (1.4 inches) wide with a 9-millimetre (0.35 in) red stripe with a white border on a blue background, flanked by 6-millimetre (0.24 in) stripes—olive green on the left and brown on the right—set 3 millimetres (0.12 inches) apart from the white border.
