= United Nations Security Council Resolution 1285 =

UN Security Council Resolution 1285
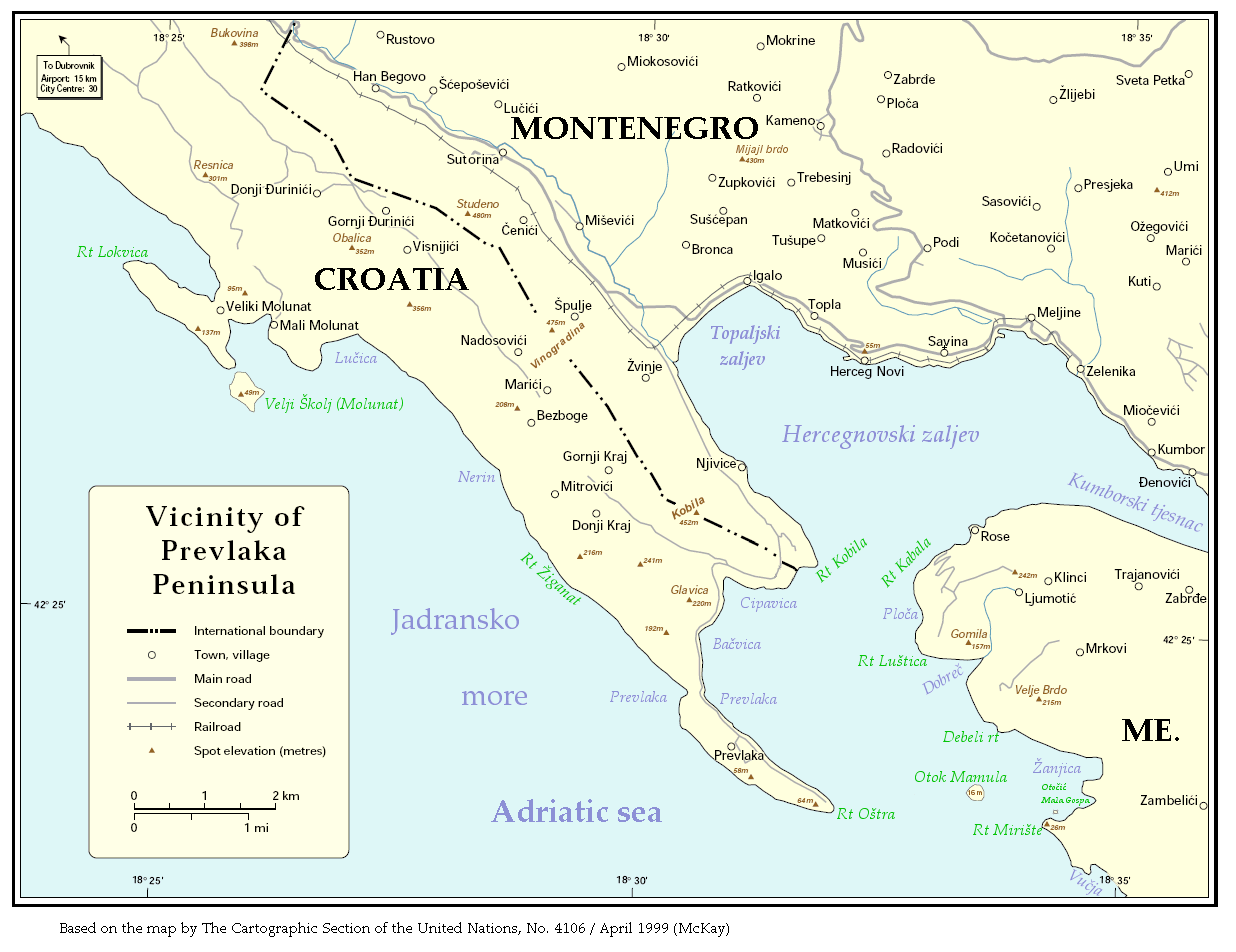
- Prevlaka peninsula
- Date: 13 January 2000
- Meeting no.: 4,088
- Code: S/RES/1285 (Document)
- Subject: The situation in Croatia
- Voting summary: 15 voted for; None voted against; None abstained
- Result: Adopted

Security Council composition
- Permanent members: China; France; Russia; United Kingdom; United States
- Non-permanent members: Argentina; Bangladesh; Canada; Jamaica; Malaysia; Mali; Namibia; Netherlands; Tunisia; Ukraine

United Nations Security Council resolution 1285, adopted unanimously on 13 January 2000, after recalling previous resolutions on Croatia including resolutions 779 (1992), 981 (1995), 1147 (1998), 1183 (1998), 1222 (1999) and 1252 (1999), the Council authorised the United Nations Mission of Observers in Prevlaka (UNMOP) to continue monitoring the demilitarisation in the Prevlaka peninsula area of Croatia until 15 July 2000. It was the first resolution of 2000.

The Security Council remained concerned at violations of the demilitarisation regime and limitations on the freedom of movement of United Nations observers. However, some positive developments had taken place. It welcomed the opening of the crossing points between Croatia and Montenegro. It facilitated civilian and commercial traffic without security incidents representing a significant confidence-building measure between the two countries.

Both Croatia and the Federal Republic of Yugoslavia (Serbia and Montenegro) were urged to fully implement an agreement on the normalisation of their relations, cease violations of the demilitarisation regime, reduce tension and ensure freedom of movement to United Nations observers. The Secretary-General Kofi Annan was asked to report by 15 April 2000 on recommendations for confidence-building measures between the two parties. Finally, the Stabilisation Force, authorised in Resolution 1088 (1996) and extended by Resolution 1247 (1999), was required to co-operate with UNMOP.

== See also ==
- Breakup of Yugoslavia
- Croatian War of Independence
- List of United Nations Security Council Resolutions 1201 to 1300 (1998–2000)
- Yugoslav Wars
