= United Nations Security Council Resolution 994 =

UN Security Council Resolution 994
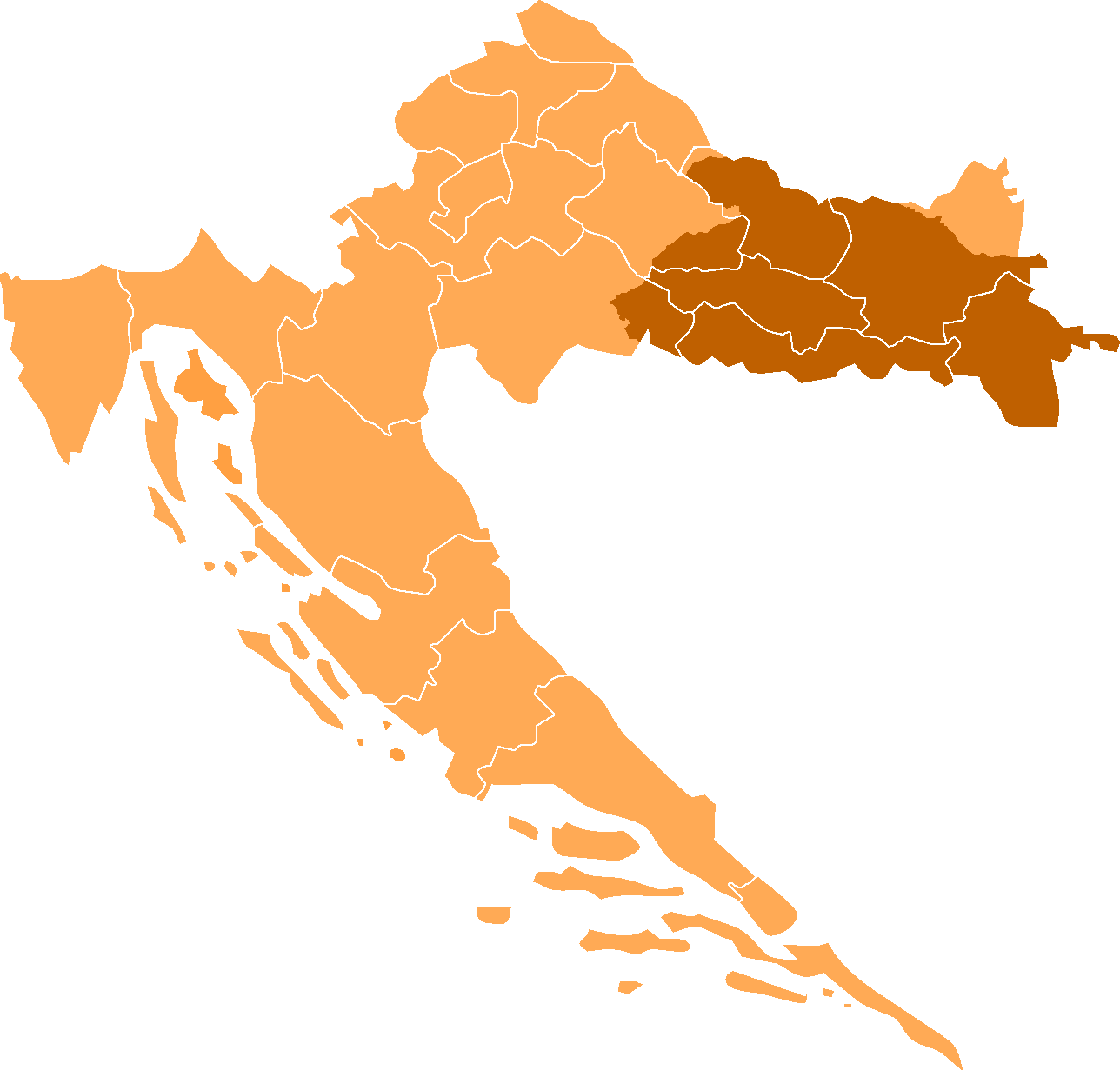
- Slavonia region in Croatia
- Date: 17 May 1995
- Meeting no.: 3,537
- Code: S/RES/994 (Document)
- Subject: Croatia
- Voting summary: 15 voted for; None voted against; None abstained
- Result: Adopted

Security Council composition
- Permanent members: China; France; Russia; United Kingdom; United States
- Non-permanent members: Argentina; Botswana; Czech Republic; Germany; Honduras; Indonesia; Italy; Nigeria; Oman; Rwanda

United Nations Security Council resolution 994, adopted unanimously on 17 May 1995, after reaffirming all resolutions on the conflicts in the former Yugoslavia, particularly resolutions 981 (1995), 982 (1995) and 990 (1995), the Council discussed the withdrawal of Croatian Army from the zone of separation taken in Operation Flash on May 1st and the full deployment of the United Nations Confidence Restoration Operation in Croatia (UNCRO).

The Security Council was concerned that the objectives of the Security Council were not met and the agreement between the parties on 7 May 1995 was violated, especially on the withdrawal of troops from the separation zones. Compliance with the ceasefire and withdrawal from these areas was important for the implementation of the mandate of UNCRO. Respect for human rights was emphasised, particularly in the region of western Slavonia (Sector West).

Earlier statements by the President of the Security Council on the Croatian offensive in the western Slavonia—the Operation Flash—in violation of a ceasefire agreement signed on 29 March 1994. It was satisfied with steps taken to meet requirements in the statements, but demanded the withdrawal of all troops from the separation zones. The authority of UNCRO was stressed in addition to respect for its security and safety.

The Government of Croatia was urged to respect the rights of the Serb population including their freedom of movement and access to international humanitarian organisations. In this regard, the Secretary-General Boutros Boutros-Ghali was asked to assess the humanitarian situation in Slavonia in co-operation with the United Nations High Commissioner for Refugees, United Nations High Commissioner for Human Rights, International Committee of the Red Cross and other organisations. The parties were also called upon to ensure the security of the Zagreb–Belgrade motorway section in the region and avoid further actions that could escalate the situation.

== See also ==
- Breakup of Yugoslavia
- Croatian War of Independence
- List of United Nations Security Council Resolutions 901 to 1000 (1994–1995)
- Operation Flash
- Operation Storm
- Yugoslav Wars
- List of United Nations Security Council Resolutions related to the conflicts in former Yugoslavia
