= Patricia Lewis (physicist) =

Irish physicist

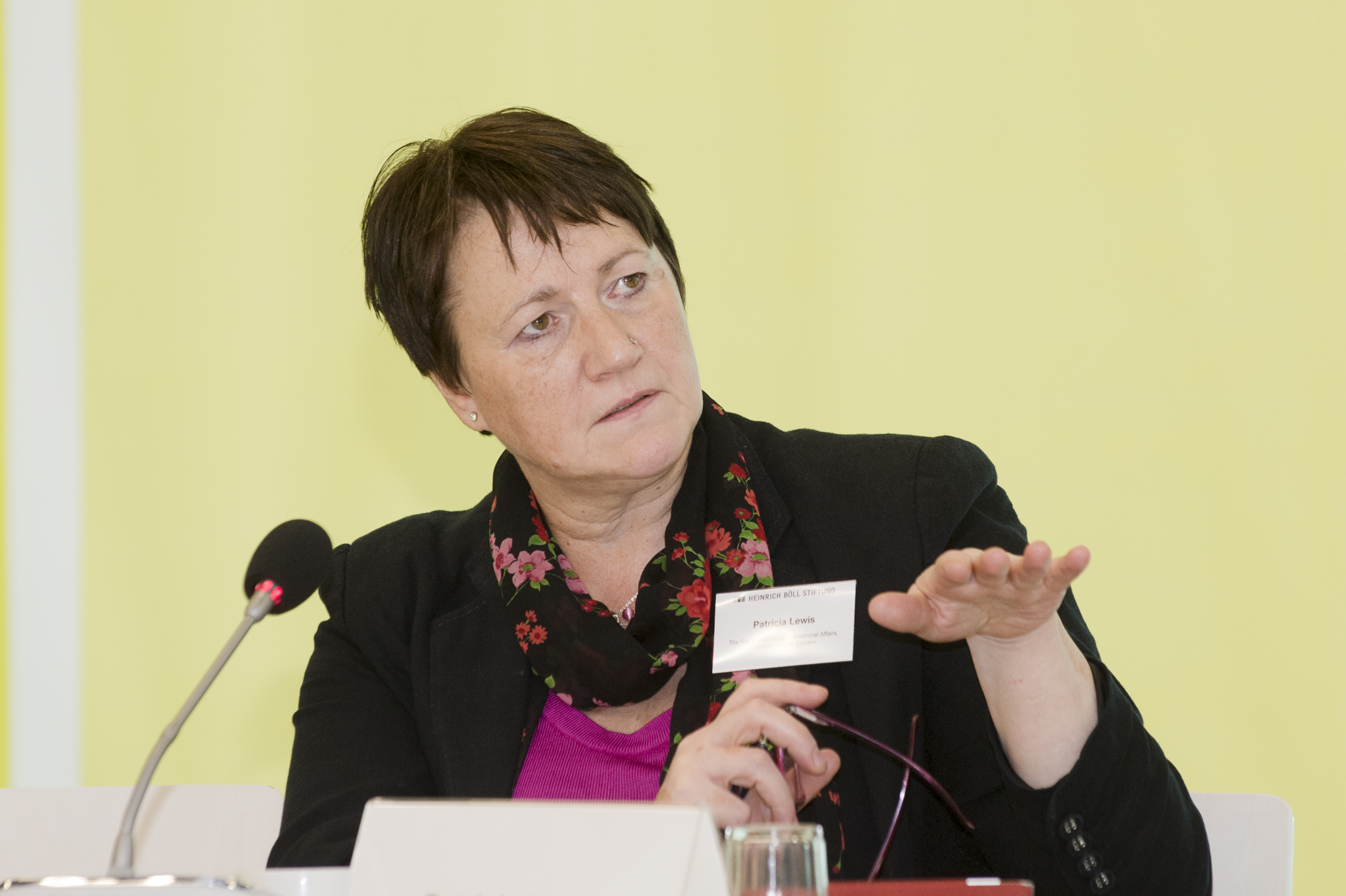
Patricia Lewis 2013 at Heinrich-Böll-Stiftung in Berlin

Patricia Lewis (born 1957) is a British and Irish nuclear physicist and arms control expert, who is currently an independent consultant. She was previously: the research director for international security at Chatham House.; the senior scientist-in-residence and deputy director at the James Martin Center for Nonproliferation Studies at Monterey Institute of International Studies (MIIS); the director of the United Nations Institute for Disarmament Research (UNIDIR) and the director of VERTIC.

== Biography ==
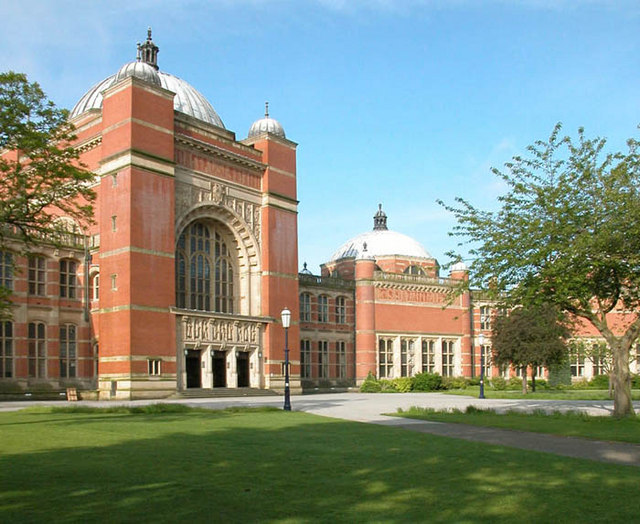
Birmingham University

A dual national of Ireland and the United Kingdom, Lewis holds a BSc in physics from the University of Manchester and a PhD in nuclear structure physics from the University of Birmingham. Dr Lewis also holds an Honorary Doctor of Laws from the University of Warwick (2015). In 1982, she was a special assistant in the Rehabilitation Centres for Children in Kolkata, India, and from 1983 to 1986, she lectured in physics at the University of Auckland, in New Zealand, from where she also carried out research at the Australian National University in Canberra, and she was a visiting lecturer at Imperial College London. during her tenure at VERTIC.

From 1986 to 1989, Lewis was information officer of the London-based VERTIC Verification Technology Information Centre, and its director from 1989 to 1997. She was the director or the United Nations Institute for Disarmament Research (UNIDIR) in Geneva 1997–2008. She was deputy director and scientist-in-residence at the James Martin Center for Nonproliferation Studies at the Monterey Institute of International Studies, California from 2008 to 2012. Lewis was a Commissioner on the WMD (Blix) Commission, an advisor to the Evans-Kawaguchi International Commission on Nuclear Non-proliferation and Disarmament (ICNND) and a member of the Ekeus Advisory Panel on Future Priorities of the OPCW.. She was co-director of the Global Commission on Internet Governance 2014–2016.. She currently sits on the Stockholm International Peace Institute (SIPRI) and the EEAS Space Advisory Board to the Special Envoy for Space. Lewis is currently the co-chair of the Scientific Advisory Group for the Treaty on the Prohibition of Nuclear Weapons,

== Career ==
During the 1988–90 negotiations on the CFE treaty, Lewis was a consultant to the British Foreign and Commonwealth Office on the verification of conventional force reductions in Europe.

In 1989–90 Lewis was appointed British government expert to the United Nations study on the Role of the United Nations in Verification. From 1990 to 1992 she was a visiting Lecturer at Imperial College London and was the 1992-3 Elizabeth Poppleton Fellow at the Australian National University.

She was chair of the UK Gulf Syndrome Study Group. She was also an external reviewer for the Canberra Commission Report on the Elimination of Nuclear Weapons, and a member of the Tokyo Forum for Nuclear Nonproliferation and Nuclear Disarmament 1998–99. From 2004 to 2006, Lewis was a commissioner on the Weapons of Mass Destruction Commission, chaired by Hans Blix. Currently Lewis was an advisor to the International Commission on Nuclear Non-proliferation and Disarmament (ICNND). Lewis served on the American Physical Society's Panel on Public Affairs (POPA) study on Technical Steps to Support Nuclear Arsenal Downsizing"

Lewis was the recipient of the 2009 American Physical Society Joseph A. Burton Forum Award for her contributions to the public understanding of science in arms control and international security and received Ireland's Presidential Distinguished Service Awards (2023) in January 2024 for her work on education, science, and innovation.
