= Disarmament Insight =

The Disarmament Insight initiative is a collaboration between UNIDIR's project Disarmament as Humanitarian Action: Making Multilateral Negotiations Work (DHA) and the Geneva Forum.

Together, they have established the Disarmament Insight initiative to help disarmament practitioners think in innovative ways about human security in their work. This initiative has been set up with support from the governments of Norway and the Netherlands.
