= United Nations Security Council Resolution 1252 =

UN Security Council Resolution 1252
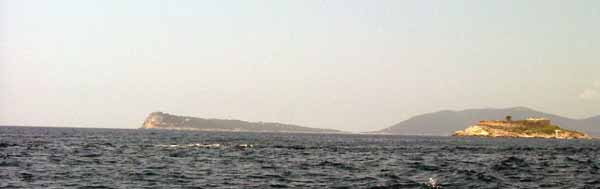
- Prevlaka peninsula
- Date: 15 July 1999
- Meeting no.: 4,023
- Code: S/RES/1252 (Document)
- Subject: The situation in Croatia
- Voting summary: 15 voted for; None voted against; None abstained
- Result: Adopted

Security Council composition
- Permanent members: China; France; Russia; United Kingdom; United States
- Non-permanent members: Argentina; Bahrain; Brazil; Canada; Gabon; Gambia; Malaysia; Namibia; Netherlands; Slovenia

United Nations Security Council resolution 1252, adopted unanimously on 15 July 1999, after recalling previous resolutions on Croatia including resolutions 779 (1992), 981 (1995), 1147 (1998), 1183 (1998) and 1222 (1999), the Council authorised the United Nations Mission of Observers in Prevlaka (UNMOP) to continue monitoring the demilitarisation in the Prevlaka peninsula area of Croatia until 15 January 2000.

The Security Council welcomed the recent lifting of restrictions on the freedom of movement of UNMOP and improved co-operation from Croatia but noted at the same time long-standing violations of the demilitarisation regime and the presence of Yugoslav and occasionally Croatian forces. It also the reopening of crossing points between Croatia and Montenegro as a significant confidence-building measure which had led to civilian traffic in both directions.

Both Croatia and the Federal Republic of Yugoslavia (Serbia and Montenegro) were urged to fully implement an agreement on the normalisation of their relations, cease violations of the demilitarisation regime, reduce tension and to ensure freedom of movement to United Nations observers. The Secretary-General Kofi Annan was asked to report by 15 October 1999 on recommendations for confidence-building measures between the two parties. Finally, the Stabilisation Force, authorised in Resolution 1088 (1996) and extended by Resolution 1247 (1999), was required to co-operate with UNMOP.

== See also ==
- Breakup of Yugoslavia
- Croatian War of Independence
- List of United Nations Security Council Resolutions 1201 to 1300 (1998–2000)
- Yugoslav Wars
