= Robin Geiss =

German international law scholar (born 1974)

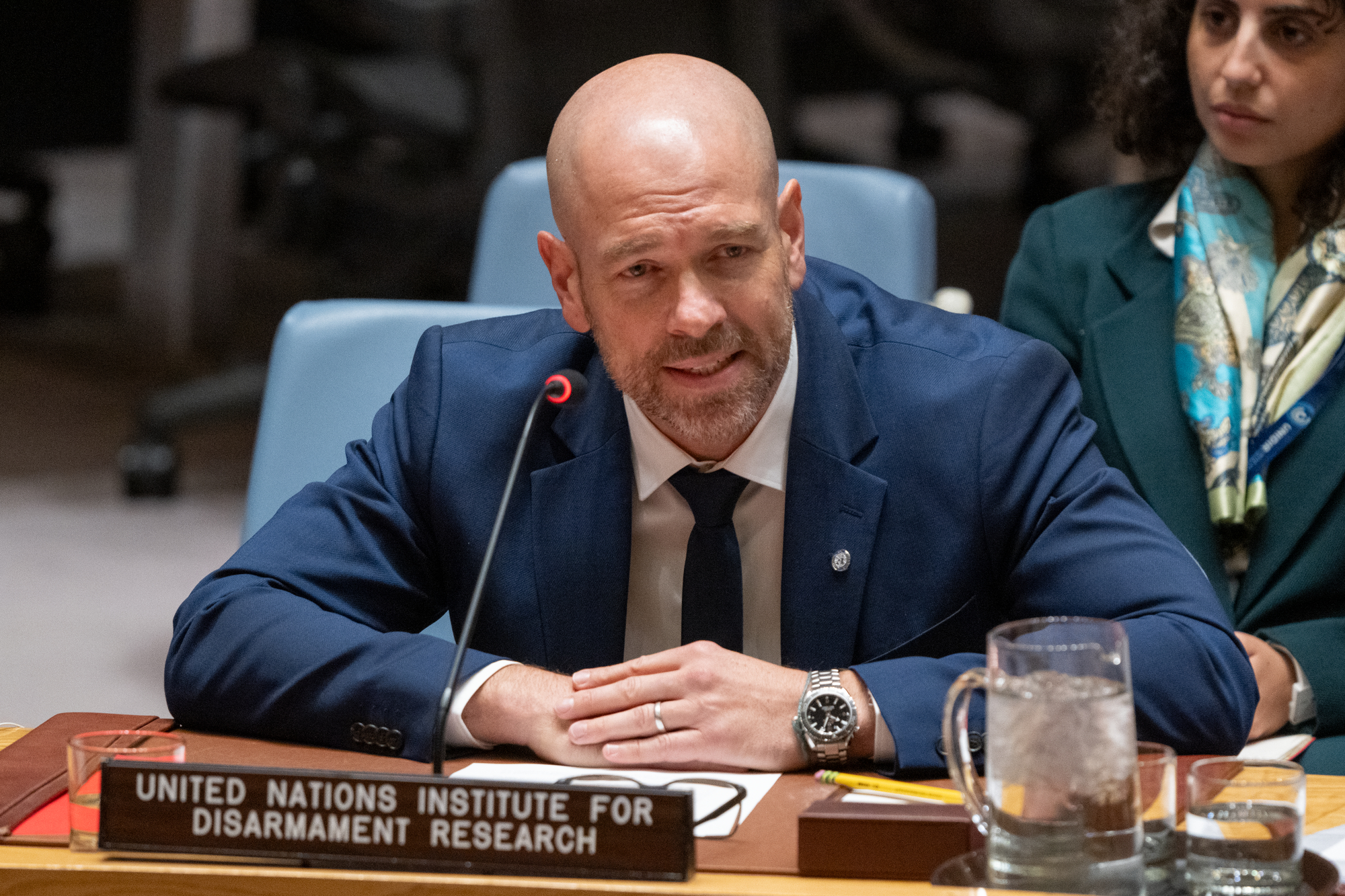
- At the UN Security Council, 2024

8th Director of the United Nations Institute for Disarmament Research
- Incumbent
- Assumed office 1 April 2021
- Preceded by: Renata Dwan

Personal details
- Born: 1974 (age 51–52)
- Education: University of Kiel (PhD), New York University (LLM), University of Edinburgh and Bielefeld University

Robin Geiss (born 1974) is a German United Nations diplomat and international legal scholar. In 2021, he was appointed by United Nations Secretary-General António Guterres as Director of the United Nations Institute for Disarmament Research. Prior to this, Geiss held the Swiss Chair of International Humanitarian Law at the Geneva Academy of International Humanitarian Law and Human Rights and served as Director of the Glasgow Centre for International Law and Security at the University of Glasgow.

== Early life and education ==
Geiss studied law at the University of Edinburgh, the University of Kiel (Ph.D. 2003) and at the New York University (LL.M. 2004). He has been a scholar of the German Academic Scholarship Foundation (Studienstiftung) and the recipient of a Marie Curie Postdoctoral Fellowship.

== Career ==
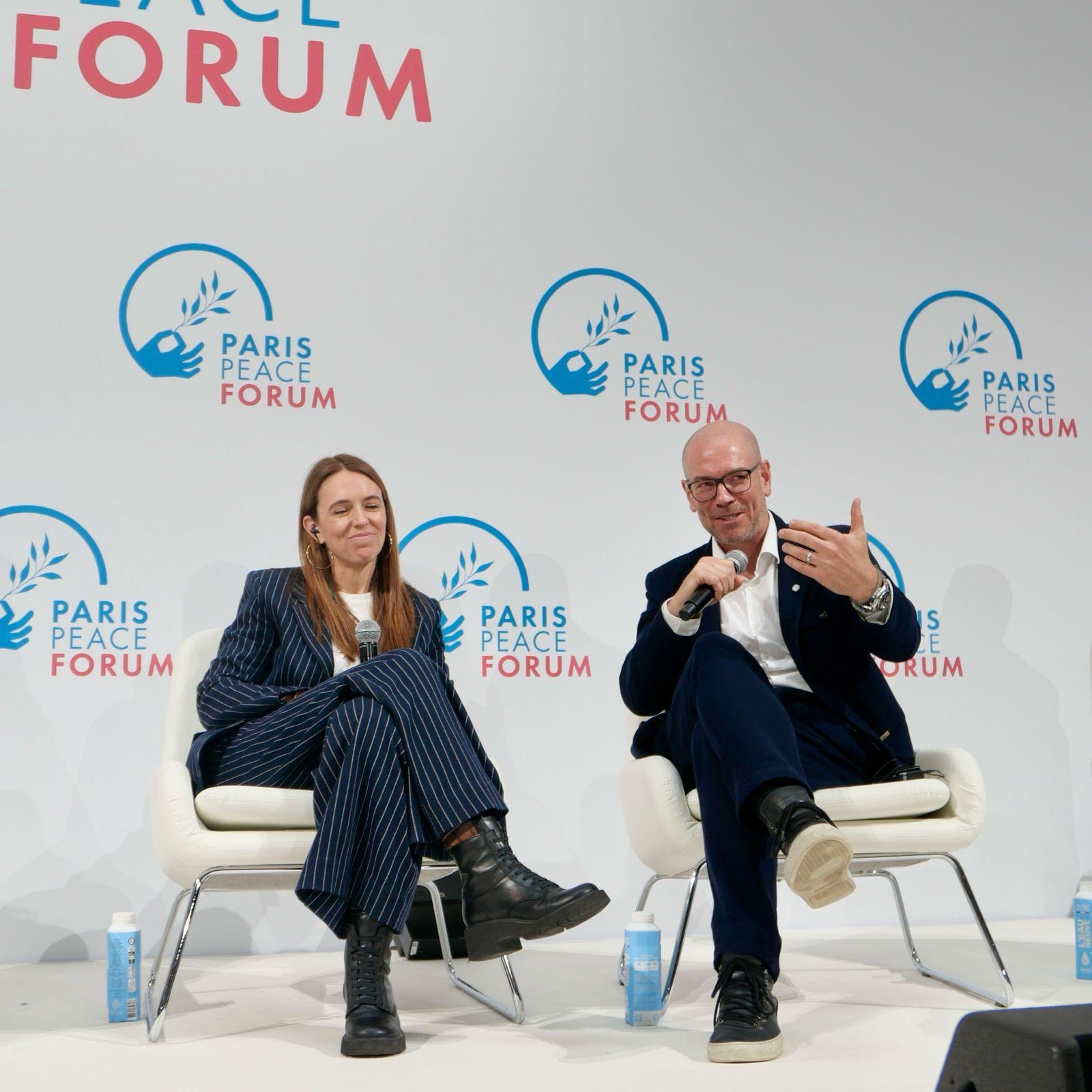
Former Prime Minister of New Zealand Dame Jacinda Ardern and UNIDIR Director Robin Geiss discuss adversarial use of AI, Paris, 2025.

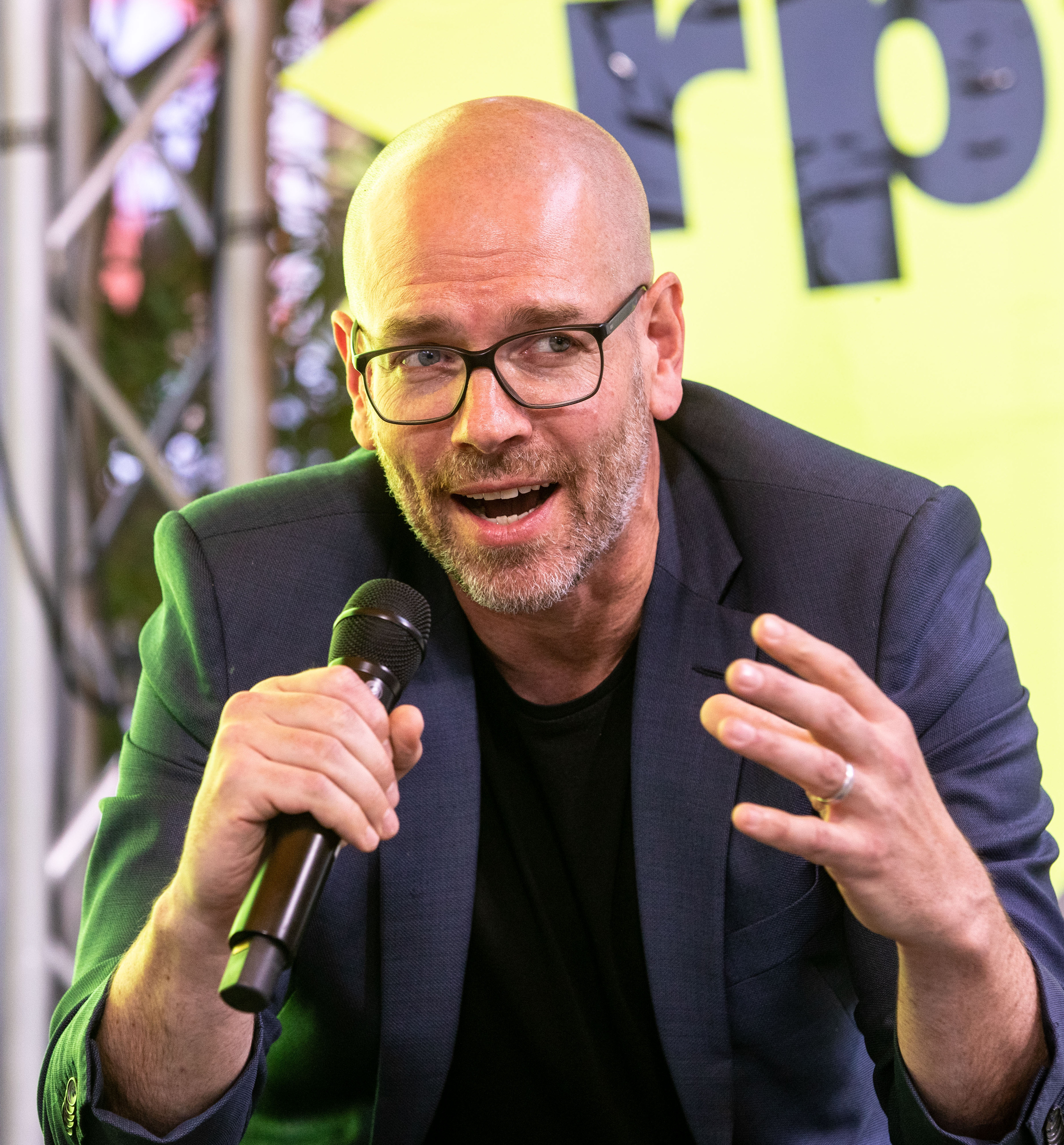
UNIDIR Director Robin Geiss participating in re:publica '23, Berlin, 2023.

Prior to his appointment as Director of UNIDIR, Geiss was Professor of International Law and Security and Director of the Glasgow Centre for International Law and Security (GCILS) at the University of Glasgow where he retains a role as Affiliate Professor at the School of Law. He is the founding Director of the Erasmus Mundus Programme in International Law of Global Security, Peace and Development.

As Swiss Chair of International Humanitarian Law (2020–2021), Geiss initiated the “disruptive military technologies” workstream at the Geneva Academy of International Humanitarian Law and Human Rights, and from 2017 to 2021 he was a visiting professor at the Paris School of International Affairs at Sciences Po in Paris.

Other academic appointments have included visiting professor at the University of Vienna (2017), Professor of Public International and European Law at the University of Potsdam (2011–2013) and Visiting Fellow at the German Institute for International and Security Affairs (SWP) in Berlin (2016), and from 2014 to 2017 Geiss served as Research Project Director for the Collaborative Research Center “Governance in Areas of Limited Statehood” (SFB 700) at the Freie Universität Berlin.

Geiss was one of the international experts who, under the auspices of the Tallinn-based NATO Cooperative Cyber Defence Centre of Excellence, drafted the "Tallinn Manual", which investigates how international law applies in cyber space. He also served as a member of the scientific advisory boards of the German Institute for International and Security Affairs (SWP), the Leibniz Science Campus on Europe and America in the Modern World, the German Foundation for Peace Research and the German Red Cross’ National Committee on International Humanitarian Law. He is an ex officio member of the United Nations Secretary General's advisory board on Disarmament Matters.

From 2004 to 2005 and again from 2007 to 2010, Geiss worked as Legal Adviser for the International Committee of the Red Cross (ICRC) Legal Division and as ICRC delegate to the United Nations Human Rights Council. From 2014 to 2021 he served as co-editor of the Yearbook of International Humanitarian Law.

== See also ==
- United Nations Institute for Disarmament Research
- International humanitarian law

== Selected publications ==
- Geiss, Robin; Melzer, Nils, eds. (2021). The Oxford Handbook of the International Law of Global Security. New York: Oxford University Press. ISBN 9780198827276.
- Geiss, Robin; Krieger, Heike, eds. (2020). The Legal Pluriverse Surrounding Multinational Military Operations. New York: Oxford University Press. ISBN 9780198842965.
- Gasser, H.-P.; Melzer, Nils; Geiss, Robin (2020). International Humanitarian Law: An Introduction (original: Humanitäres Völkerrecht: Eine Einführung) (in German). Zurich: Schulthess Verlag. ISBN 9783725581665.
- Geiss, Robin; Zimmermann, Andreas; Haumer, Stefanie, eds. (2017). Humanizing the Laws of War: The Red Cross and the Development of International Humanitarian Law. Cambridge: Cambridge University Press. ISBN 9781316759967.
- Bhuta, Nehal; Beck, Susanne; Geiss, Robin; Liu, Hin-Yan; Kress, Claus, eds. (2016). Autonomous Weapons Systems - Law, Ethics, Policy. Cambridge: Cambridge University Press. ISBN 9781316607657.
- Geiss, Robin (2015). The international law dimension of autonomous weapons systems (Report). Berlin: Friedrich-Ebert-Foundation.
- Petrig, A.; Geiss, R. (2011). Piracy and Armed Robbery at Sea: The Legal Framework for Counter-Piracy Operations in Somalia and the Gulf of Aden. Oxford: Oxford University Press. ISBN 9780199609529.
- Geiss, R. (2010). "The Conduct of Hostilities in and via Cyberspace". Proceedings of the ASIL Annual Meeting. 104: 371–374. doi:10.5305/procannmeetasil.104.0371. S2CID 159350441.
