= United Nations Security Council Resolution 990 =

UN Security Council Resolution 990
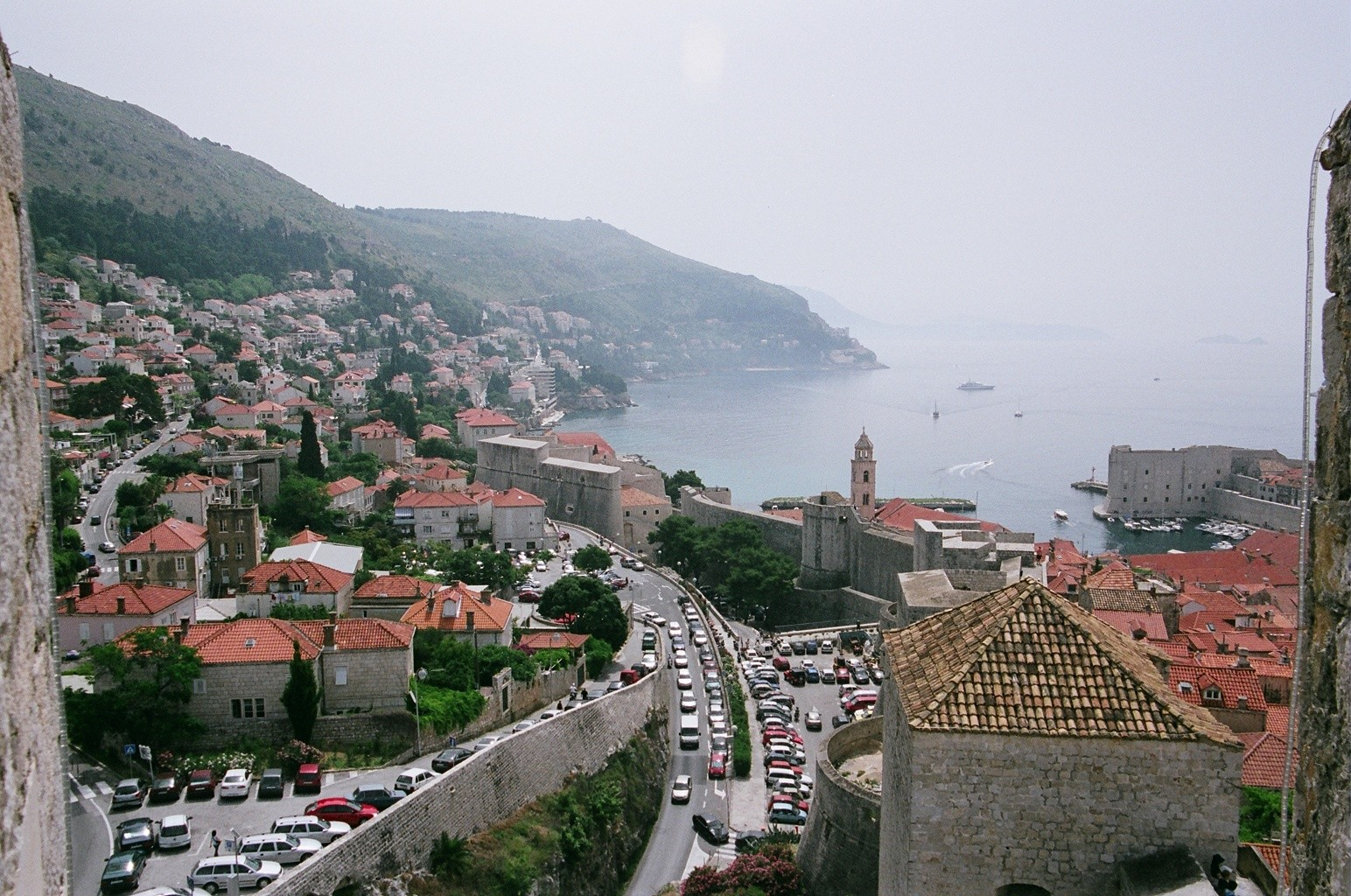
- Dubrovnik in Croatia
- Date: 28 April 1995
- Meeting no.: 3,527
- Code: S/RES/990 (Document)
- Subject: Croatia
- Voting summary: 15 voted for; None voted against; None abstained
- Result: Adopted

Security Council composition
- Permanent members: China; France; Russia; United Kingdom; United States
- Non-permanent members: Argentina; Botswana; Czech Republic; Germany; Honduras; Indonesia; Italy; Nigeria; Oman; Rwanda

United Nations Security Council resolution 990, adopted unanimously on 28 April 1995, after reaffirming all resolutions on the conflicts in the former Yugoslavia, particularly resolutions 981 (1995) and 982 (1995), the council, acting under Chapter VII of the United Nations Charter, authorised the deployment of the United Nations Confidence Restoration Operation in Croatia (UNCRO).

The council called upon the government of Croatia and the local Serb authorities to co-operate fully with UNCRO in the implementation of its mandate, expressing concern that a Status of Forces Agreement had not yet been signed by Croatia. The Secretary-General was requested to report back to the Council no later than 15 May 1995 on the matter.

== See also ==
- Breakup of Yugoslavia
- Croatian War of Independence
- List of United Nations Security Council Resolutions 901 to 1000 (1994–1995)
- Operation Storm
- Yugoslav Wars
- List of United Nations Security Council Resolutions related to the conflicts in former Yugoslavia
