= United Nations Institute for Disarmament Research =

Research institute of the United Nations

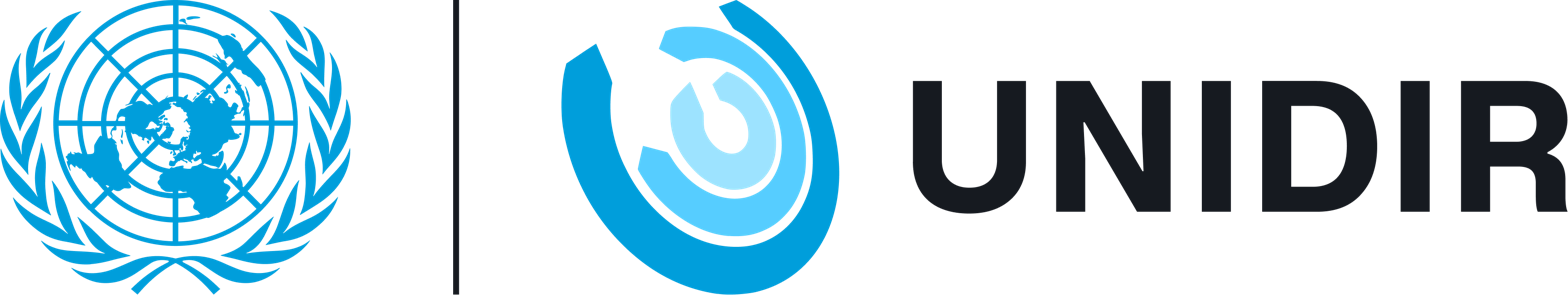
- Abbreviation: UNIDIR
- Formation: 1980; 46 years ago
- Type: Research institute
- Legal status: Active
- Headquarters: Geneva, Switzerland
- Head: Director; Robin Geiss
- Parent organization: United Nations General Assembly; United Nations Economic and Social Council
- Website: unidir.org

The United Nations Institute for Disarmament Research (UNIDIR) is a specialized research institute of the United Nations focused on disarmament and international security. It was established in 1980 by the United Nations General Assembly with the stated purpose of informing states and the global community on questions of international security, and to assist with disarmament efforts so as to facilitate progress toward greater security and economic and social development for all.

The UN General Assembly specified that UNIDIR would be an autonomous entity within the United Nations structure, so that its work could be conducted in scientific independence.

== Background ==
Through its research projects, publications, small meetings and expert networks, UNIDIR promotes creative thinking and dialogue on the disarmament and security challenges of today and of tomorrow.

UNIDIR explores both current and future security issues, examining topics as varied as tactical nuclear weapons, refugee security, computer warfare, regional confidence-building measures, and small arms.

Working with researchers, diplomats, government officials, non-governmental organisations and other institutions, UNIDIR acts as a bridge between the research community and United Nations Member States. UNIDIR's work is funded by contributions from governments and donor foundations.

UNIDIR is based in Geneva, the primary centre for security and disarmament negotiations, home of the Conference on Disarmament, and global focal point for humanitarian concerns such as human rights, refugees, migration, health and labour issues.

== Research areas ==
In 2018, the board of trustees endorsed the organisation's following research agenda for 2018–2020:

- Weapons of Mass Destruction and Other Strategic Weapons – Reducing the risk of use of nuclear weapons; compliance and enforcement approaches and lessons; promoting habits of cooperation in WMD regimes; and space security and sustainability.
- Conventional Arms – Urbanisation of violence: adopting arms control to new environments; weapons and ammunition management: supporting country approaches; and arms control in prevention and peacemaking.
- New Weapon Technologies – Preventing, deterring, and responding to malicious cyber attacks, including the role of the private sector; and understanding the implications of increasing autonomy.
- Gender and Disarmament – Promoting dialogue and knowledge sharing to advance gender-responsive disarmament; and developing tools to apply gender perspectives in disarmament frameworks.
- Middle East Weapons of Mass Destruction Free Zone – Filling an important research gap related to how the issue of the ME WMDFZ has evolved over time, including lessons for current and future prospects.

== Mandate ==
UNIDIR works on the basis of the provisions of the Final Document of the First Special Session of the UN General Assembly Devoted to Disarmament and also takes into account relevant General Assembly recommendations. The work programme is reviewed annually and is subject to approval by the UN Secretary-General's Advisory Board on Disarmament Matters, which also functions as UNIDIR's Board of Trustees. The Director reports yearly to the General Assembly on the activities of the institute.

UNIDIR's mandate is as follows:

The work of the Institute shall aim at:

(a) Providing the international community with more diversified and complete data on problems relating to international security, the armaments race and disarmament in all fields, particularly in the nuclear field, so as to facilitate progress, through negotiations, towards greater security for all States and towards the economic and social development of all peoples;

(b) Promoting informed participation by all States in disarmament efforts;

(c) Assisting ongoing negotiations on disarmament and continuing efforts to ensure greater international security at a progressively lower level of armaments, particularly nuclear armaments, by means of objective and factual studies and analyses;

(d) Carrying out more in-depth, forward-looking and long-term research on disarmament, so as to provide a general insight to the problems involved and stimulating new initiatives for new negotiations.

The mandate is from Article II, Paragraph 2 of the institute's Statute, which may be found here.

== Management ==
All inner workings and research done by UNIDIR is supervised by a board of trustees and the director. The board also serves as the secretary-general's advisory board on disarmament matters. Each member must be knowledgeable in security, arms control and disarmament. Each member is elected by the Secretary General to serve a two-year term.

=== Director ===
In February 2021, Robin Geiss was appointed as the director of UNIDIR, succeeding Irish disarmament expert Renata Dwan. Geiss formerly served as the director of the Glasgow Centre for International Law and Security at the University of Glasgow and as the Swiss Chair of International Humanitarian Law with the Geneva Academy of International Humanitarian Law and Human Rights.

=== Board members ===
As of 2021 the members of the board of trustees were:

- Semla Ashipala-Musavyi (Namibia) – Chair of the board of trustees; ambassador, permanent secretary, Ministry of International Relations and Cooperation of Manimibia, Windhoek
- Corentin Brustlein (France) – Research fellow, Security Studies Center, Institut Francais Relations Internationales, Paris
- Lucia Dammert (Peru) – Associate professor, Universidad de Santiago de Chile, Santiago
- Lewis A Dunn (United States) – Former US ambassador to the Review Conference of the Parties to the Treaty on the Non-Proliferation of Nuclear Weapons, Virginia, United States of America
- Fu Cong (China) – Ambassador, director-general, Department of Arms Control, Ministry of Foreign Affairs of China, Beijing
- Arminka Helic (United Kingdom) – Member, House of Lords of the United Kingdom, London
- Anton Khlopkov (Russian Federation) – Director, Center for Energy and Security Studies, Moscow
- Amandeep Gill (India) – (on sabbatical from the advisory board)
- Merel Noorman (Netherlands) – Assistant professor, Tilburg University, Tilburg, Netherlands
- Enkhtsetseg Ochir (Mongolia) – Ambassador of Mongolia to Sweden, Stockholm
- Abiodun Williams (Sierra Leone) – Director, Institute for Global Leadership, professor of the Practice of International Politics, The Fletcher School of Law and Diplomacy, Tufts University, Medford, United States of America
- Motaz Zahran (Egypt) – Ambassador, deputy assistant foreign minister for cabinet affairs, Cairo
- Robin Geiss (Germany) – (Ex-officio member)

=== List of directors ===
No.	Name (Birth–Death)	Term of office			Country	Secretary-General	Ref.
No.	Name (Birth–Death)	Took office	Left office	Time in office	Country	Secretary-General	Ref.
1	Liviu Bota (born 1936)	1980	1987	7 years	Romania	Boutros Boutros-Ghali	
2	Jayantha Dhanapala (born 1938)	1987	1992	5 years	Sri Lanka	Boutros Boutros-Ghali	
3	Sverre Lodgaard (born 1945)	1992	1996	4 years	Norway	Boutros Boutros-Ghali	
4	Patricia Lewis (born 1957)	1997	2008	11 years	United Kingdom	Kofi Annan	
5	Theresa Hitchens (born 1953)	2009	2014	5 years	United States	Ban Ki-moon	
6	Jarmo Sareva (born 1959)	2014	2018	4 years	Finland	Ban Ki-moon	
7	Renata Dwan (born 1969)	2018	2021	3 years	Ireland	António Guterres	
8	Robin Geiss (born 1974)	2021	Incumbent	5 years, 8 months	Germany	António Guterres	

== See also ==
- Disarmament as Humanitarian Action
- International Atomic Energy Agency
- International Day for the Total Elimination of Nuclear Weapons
- Nuclear Non-Proliferation Treaty
- United Nations Office for Disarmament Affairs
- UN System
