= Verification Research, Training and Information Centre =

UK-based nongovernmental organization

- Headquarters: London
- Website: www.vertic.org

VERTIC (Verification Research, Training and Information Centre) is a non-governmental organisation established in 1986 to promote effective verification of international agreements. VERTIC is primarily concerned with arms control and disarmament, peace and environmental agreements. VERTIC has an international outlook, and is based in London.

VERTIC's activities cover a wide range from negotiation of verification provisions, monitoring and verification, enforcement, and confidence-building measures. VERTIC has been funded by both private foundations and organisations, and various governments including Belgium, Canada, the Netherlands, New Zealand, Norway and the United Kingdom.

From 2007 to 2010 VERTIC participated in joint research with UK's Atomic Weapons Establishment and several Norwegian organisations to determine if verification of nuclear warhead dismantlement could be accomplished without access to secret weapons design information, which would help in any future worldwide nuclear disarmament. This was the first time a nuclear weapons state and a non-nuclear weapons state collaborated on such a detailed project, and led to a Working Paper being submitted to the 2010 NPT Review Conference.

The 2000 NPT Review Conference called for research into the concept of the irreversibility of nuclear disarmament, which VERTIC is engaged in as part of a consortium led by King's College London.
