= Disarmament as Humanitarian Action =

UNIDIR research project

Disarmament as Humanitarian Action: Making Multilateral Negotiations Work (DHA) is a research project carried out at the United Nations Institute for Disarmament Research (UNIDIR). This project, launched in 2004, examines current difficulties for the international community in tackling disarmament and arms control challenges.

== Research activities ==
The DHA project's research focuses on two major themes:

- Showing how humanitarian perspectives add value to disarmament and arms control work, and how proposing new ways these approaches could assist multilateral processes;
- Examining multilateral negotiating processes more broadly to help practitioners "think outside the box" in their work by drawing on interdisciplinary research.

== Publications ==
These themes are explored in three UNIDIR publications drawing from a range of contributors in civil society, diplomacy, and the policy and research fields:

- Alternative Approaches in Multilateral Decision Making: Disarmament as Humanitarian Action (2005) introduced the project and examined difficulties for multilateral practitioners in negotiating effectively in disarmament and arms control;
- Disarmament as Humanitarian Action: From Perspective to Practice (2006) offered practical insights for efforts to reduce human insecurity drawing on lessons learned from humanitarian contexts such as international work on explosive remnants of war, small arms and anti-personnel mines; and
- Thinking Outside the Box in Multilateral Negotiations (2006) offered new practical tools and perspectives to assist the ongoing work of multilateral disarmament practitioners.

== Current work ==
An emphasis of the DHA project's work in 2007 is to communicate its research findings to multilateral practitioners. As one element of these efforts, the DHA project created the Disarmament Insight initiative with the Geneva Forum. This initiative is prompting constructive and creative engagement in the multilateral disarmament community through a range of activities including workshops and online resources building on the previous respective work of both DHA and the Geneva Forum.

The DHA project is supported by the Governments of Norway and the Netherlands.
