= United Nations Security Council Resolution 1183 =

UN Security Council Resolution 1183
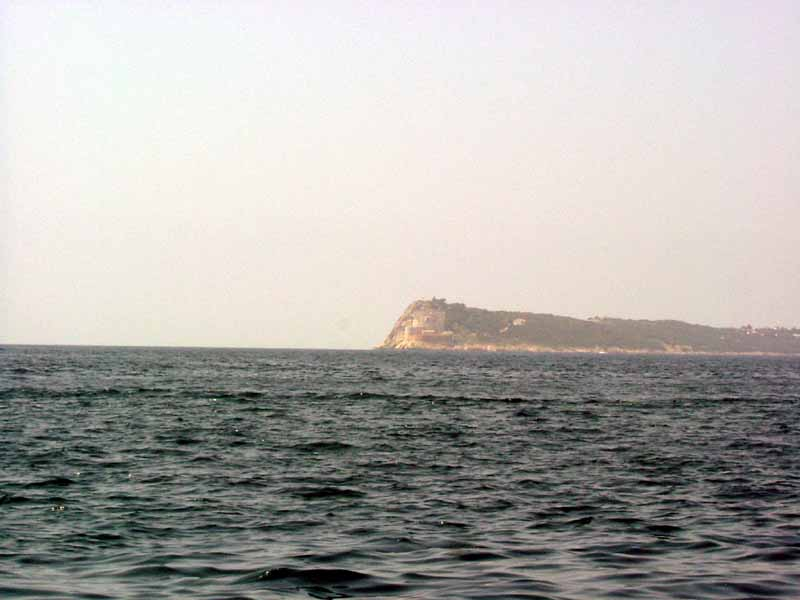
- Prevlaka peninsula
- Date: 15 July 1998
- Meeting no.: 3,907
- Code: S/RES/1183 (Document)
- Subject: The situation in Croatia
- Voting summary: 15 voted for; None voted against; None abstained
- Result: Adopted

Security Council composition
- Permanent members: China; France; Russia; United Kingdom; United States
- Non-permanent members: Bahrain; Brazil; Costa Rica; Gabon; Gambia; Japan; Kenya; Portugal; Slovenia; Sweden

United Nations Security Council resolution 1183, adopted unanimously on 15 July 1998, after recalling previous resolutions on Croatia including resolutions 779 (1992), 981 (1995) and 1147 (1998), the Council authorised the United Nations Mission of Observers in Prevlaka (UNMOP) to continue monitoring the demilitarisation in the Prevlaka peninsula area of Croatia until 15 January 1999.

The Secretary-General Kofi Annan had reported positive developments in the situation. Both the Federal Republic of Yugoslavia (Serbia and Montenegro) and Croatia had made proposals and initiatives to resolve the dispute. There were long-standing violations of the demilitarisation regime concerning demining activities and restrictions on the freedom of movement of United Nations personnel, therefore the continued presence of the observers was required.

The parties were urged to fully implement an agreement on the normalisation of their relations, cease violations of the demilitarisation regime, reduce tension and to ensure freedom of movement to United Nations observers. The Secretary-General was requested to report to the council on the situation by 15 October 1998 concerning progress towards a peaceful solution of the dispute between Croatia and Serbia and Montenegro. Finally, the Stabilisation Force, authorised in Resolution 1088 (1996) and extended by Resolution 1174 (1998), was required to co-operate with UNMOP.

== See also ==
- Breakup of Yugoslavia
- Croatian War of Independence
- List of United Nations Security Council Resolutions 1101 to 1200 (1997–1998)
- Yugoslav Wars
- List of United Nations Security Council Resolutions related to the conflicts in former Yugoslavia
