= United Nations Security Council Resolution 1147 =

UN Security Council Resolution 1147
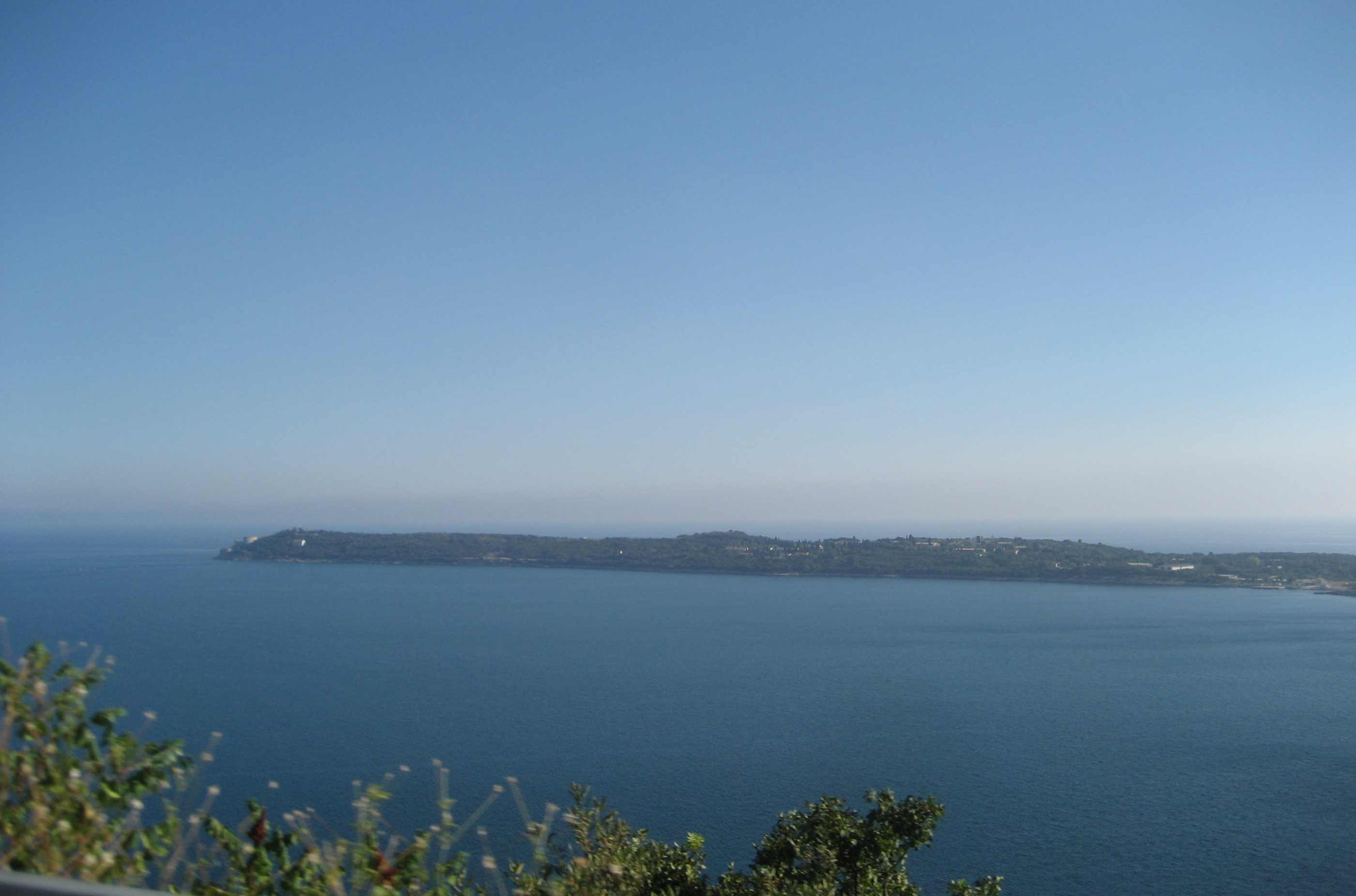
- Prevlaka peninsula
- Date: 13 January 1998
- Meeting no.: 3,847
- Code: S/RES/1147 (Document)
- Subject: The situation in Croatia
- Voting summary: 15 voted for; None voted against; None abstained
- Result: Adopted

Security Council composition
- Permanent members: China; France; Russia; United Kingdom; United States
- Non-permanent members: Bahrain; Brazil; Costa Rica; Gabon; Gambia; Japan; Kenya; Portugal; Slovenia; Sweden

United Nations Security Council resolution 1147, adopted unanimously on 13 January 1998, after recalling previous resolutions on Croatia including resolutions 779 (1992), 981 (1995), 1025 (1995), 1038 (1996), 1066 (1996), 1093 (1997) and 1119 (1997), the Council authorised the United Nations Mission of Observers in Prevlaka (UNMOP) to continue monitoring the demilitarisation in the Prevlaka peninsula area of Croatia until 15 July 1998.

The council welcomed that Croatia and the Federal Republic of Yugoslavia (Serbia and Montenegro) had made progress in adopting practical suggestions proposed by the United Nations military observers in May 1996 in order to reduce tension and improve safety and security in the area in addition to resolving the Prevlaka dispute. There was concern at long-standing violations of the demilitarisation regime, but noted that these had occurred less often. The presence of United Nations military observers remained essential for the negotiations.

The parties were urged to fully implement an agreement on the normalisation of their relations, to refrain from violence and to ensure freedom of movement to United Nations observers. The Secretary-General Kofi Annan was requested to report to the council on the situation by 5 July 1998 concerning progress towards a peaceful solution of the dispute between the two countries. Finally, the Stabilisation Force, authorised in Resolution 1088 (1996), were required to co-operate with UNMOP.

== See also ==
- Breakup of Yugoslavia
- Croatian War of Independence
- List of United Nations Security Council Resolutions 1101 to 1200 (1997–1998)
- Yugoslav Wars
- List of United Nations Security Council Resolutions related to the conflicts in former Yugoslavia
