= United Nations Security Council Resolution 779 =

UN Security Council Resolution 779
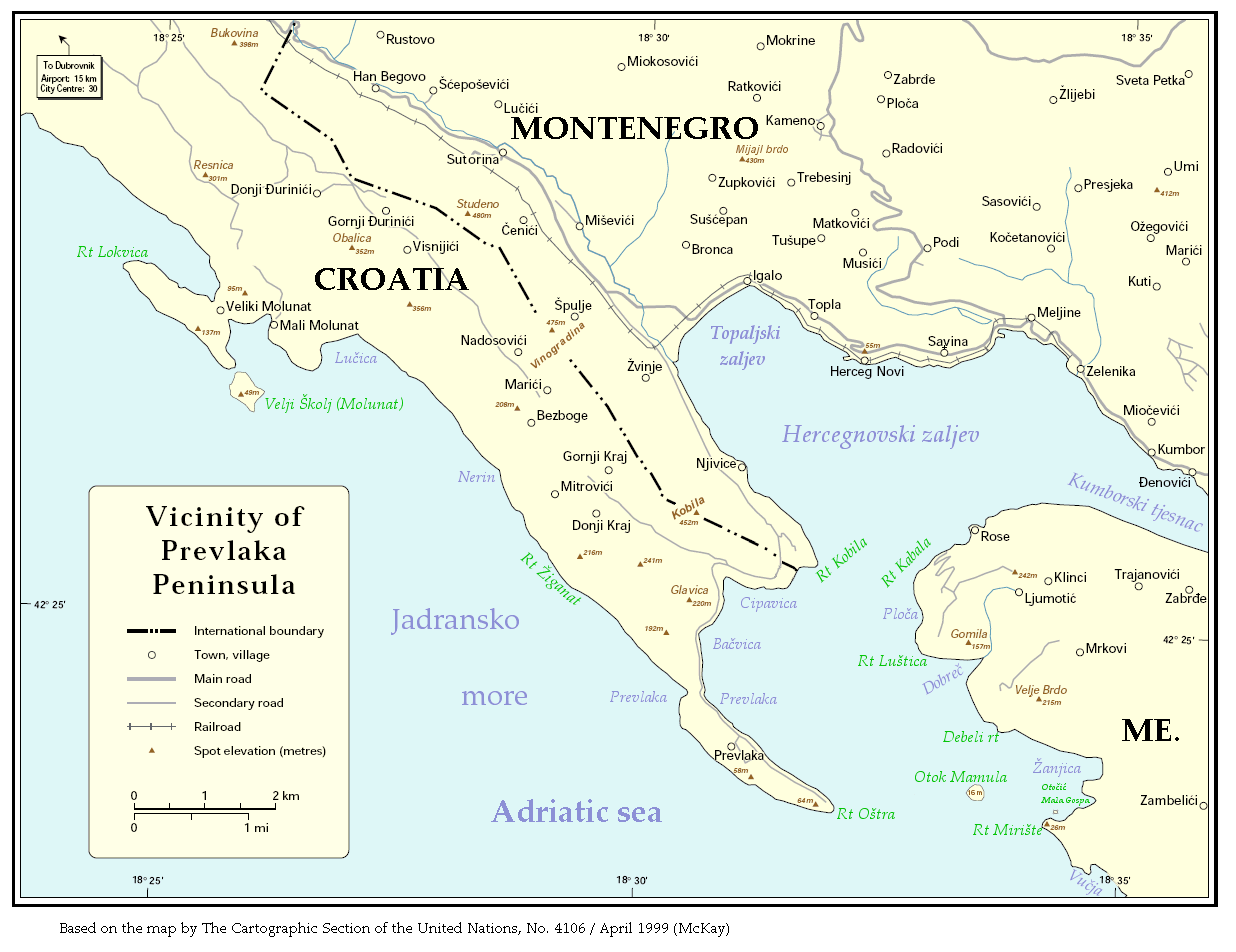
- Map of the vicinity of Prevlaka peninsula in Croatia
- Date: 6 October 1992
- Meeting no.: 3,118
- Code: S/RES/779 (Document)
- Subject: Croatia
- Voting summary: 15 voted for; None voted against; None abstained
- Result: Adopted

Security Council composition
- Permanent members: China; France; Russia; United Kingdom; United States
- Non-permanent members: Austria; Belgium; Cape Verde; Ecuador; Hungary; India; Japan; Morocco; Venezuela; Zimbabwe

United Nations Security Council resolution 779, adopted unanimously on 6 October 1992, after reaffirming Resolution 743 (1992) and subsequent resolutions and noting a report by the Secretary-General Boutros Boutros-Ghali submitted pursuant to resolutions 743 and 762 (1992), the Council authorised the United Nations Protection Force (UNPROFOR) to assume responsibility for monitoring the complete withdrawal of the Yugoslav People's Army from Croatia, demilitarization of the Prevlaka peninsula and the removal of heavy weapons from neighbouring areas of Croatia and Montenegro in co-operation with the European Community Monitoring Mission.

The Council called on all parties concerned to improve their co-operation with UNPROFOR in the performance of its new task as well as the tasks it was already undertaking in the United Nations Protected Areas. It also urged all parties in Croatia to comply with their obligations under the United Nations peacekeeping plan, particularly with regard to the withdrawal of forces and disarmament of all forces and paramilitary forces.

The resolution went on to endorse the agreement by the Presidents of the Republic of Croatia and the Federal Republic of Yugoslavia (Serbia and Montenegro) on 30 September 1992, that stated that all statements or commitments made under duress would be considered null and void. The Council highlighted that this applied in particular to property and land rights, after expressing concern at the "wanton destruction and devastation of property". It also praised the efforts of the co-chairmen of the International Conference on Former Yugoslavia to ensure the restoration of power and water supplies before the coming winter.

== See also ==
- Breakup of Yugoslavia
- Bosnian War
- Croatian War of Independence
- List of United Nations Security Council Resolutions 701 to 800 (1991–1993)
- Yugoslav Wars
- List of United Nations Security Council Resolutions related to the conflicts in former Yugoslavia
