= United Nations Mission of Observers in Prevlaka =

Coordinates: 42°23′56.40″N 18°31′01.20″E

UN Mission of Observers in Prevlaka
- Abbreviation: UNMOP
- Formation: 15 January 1996
- Type: Observer Mission
- Legal status: Completed
- Head: Rodolfo Sergio Mujica
- Parent organization: United Nations Security Council
- Website: UNMOP

UN Mission of Observers in Prevlaka (UNMOP) was established on 15 January 1996 in Security Council Resolution 1038 as a peacekeeping mission to monitor the demilitarization of the disputed Prevlaka peninsula by carrying out daily foot and vehicle patrols on both sides of the border between Croatia and Yugoslavia (specifically, its federal unit Montenegro).

Countries providing support for this mission included Argentina, Bangladesh, Belgium, Brazil, Czech Republic, Denmark, Egypt, Finland, Ghana, Indonesia, Ireland, Jordan, Kenya, Nepal, New Zealand, Nigeria, Norway, Pakistan, Poland, Russian Federation, Switzerland and Ukraine. It was disbanded on 15 December 2002, the date set by the UN Security Council.
