= United Nations Security Council Resolution 981 =

UN Security Council Resolution 981
- Croatia
- Date: 31 March 1995
- Meeting no.: 3,512
- Code: S/RES/981 (Document)
- Subject: Croatia
- Voting summary: 15 voted for; None voted against; None abstained
- Result: Adopted

Security Council composition
- Permanent members: China; France; Russia; United Kingdom; United States
- Non-permanent members: Argentina; Botswana; Czech Republic; Germany; Honduras; Indonesia; Italy; Nigeria; Oman; Rwanda

United Nations Security Council resolution 981, adopted unanimously on 31 March 1995, after reaffirming all resolutions on the situation in the former Yugoslavia, the council established the United Nations Confidence Restoration Operation in Croatia (UNCRO) for a period terminating 30 November 1995.

The security council wanted a negotiated solution to the conflicts in former Yugoslavia. One such conflict was in Croatia with the Serbs in that country. Important parts of the United Nations peace plan for Croatia still needed to be implemented, including demobilisation in the Serb areas, the return of all refugees and the establishment of a police force, in addition to provisions in resolutions 871 (1993) and 947 (1994).

It was noted that the current mandate of the United Nations Protection Force (UNPROFOR) in Croatia was to expire on 31 March 1995 and also a request from the Government of Croatia regarding the establishment of a peacekeeping force in the country. Respect for human rights was urged as an essential step towards peace. The safety and freedom of movement of UNPROFOR had to be ensured.

Acting under Chapter VII of the United Nations Charter, the council established UNCRO with 7,000 personnel for a period until 30 November 1995, with the following mandate:

(a) to perform functions in the ceasefire agreement between Croatia and local Serbs;
(b) to help in the implementation of the economic agreement;
(c) to help in the implementation of Security Council resolutions;
(d) to monitor the border between Croatia and Bosnia and Herzegovina and Croatia and Federal Republic of Yugoslavia (Serbia and Montenegro);
(e) to assist in the transfer of humanitarian aid to Bosnia and Herzegovina through Croatia;
(f) to monitor the demobilisation of the Prevlaka peninsula;

The Secretary-General Boutros Boutros-Ghali was requested to report back no later than 21 April 1995 on the implementation of the above mandate. He was further required to report every four months on the mandate and implementation of agreements. UNCRO had to create conditions under which an agreement could be reached, while Member States were authorised to provide air support to the peacekeeping operation. The parties for their part were responsible for the safety of the United Nations personnel and to work on a peaceful solution to their dispute.

Finally, Croatia was asked to sign a Status of Forces Agreement and to provide suitable radio broadcasting frequencies and television broadcasting slots at no cost to the United Nations.

On the same day the council also established the United Nations Preventive Deployment Force in Macedonia in Resolution 983.

== See also ==
- Breakup of Yugoslavia
- Croatian War of Independence
- List of United Nations Security Council Resolutions 901 to 1000 (1994–1995)
- Operation Storm
- Yugoslav Wars
- List of United Nations Security Council Resolutions related to the conflicts in former Yugoslavia
