= United Nations Security Council Resolution 1423 =

UN Security Council Resolution 1423
- SFOR badge
- Date: 12 July 2002
- Meeting no.: 4,573
- Code: S/RES/1423 (Document)
- Subject: The situation in Bosnia and Herzegovina
- Voting summary: 15 voted for; None voted against; None abstained
- Result: Adopted

Security Council composition
- Permanent members: China; France; Russia; United Kingdom; United States
- Non-permanent members: Bulgaria; Cameroon; Colombia; Guinea; Ireland; Mauritius; Mexico; Norway; Singapore; Syria

United Nations Security Council resolution 1423, adopted unanimously on 12 July 2002, after recalling resolutions 1031 (1995), 1035 (1995), 1088 (1996), 1103 (1997), 1107 (1997), 1144 (1997), 1168 (1998), 1174 (1998), 1184 (1998), 1247 (1999), 1305 (2000), 1357 (2001) and 1396 (2002), the Council extended the mandate of the United Nations Mission in Bosnia and Herzegovina (UNMIBH) for a period until on 31 December 2002 and authorised states participating in the NATO-led Stabilisation Force (SFOR) to continue to do so for a further twelve months.

The adoption of the resolution was delayed due to a veto from the United States concerning immunity for its peacekeepers from the International Criminal Court (ICC), whose Statute entered into force on 1 July 2002. The current resolution was approved following the adoption of Resolution 1422 (2002) granting immunity to nationals of countries who were not party to the ICC Statute.

== Resolution ==
=== Observations ===
The Security Council underlined the importance of the Dayton Agreement (General Framework Agreement) and welcomed positive contributions by Croatia and the Federal Republic of Yugoslavia (Serbia and Montenegro) in the peace process in Bosnia and Herzegovina. The situation continued to constitute a threat to peace and security and the council was determined to promote a peaceful resolution of the conflict. It welcomed the decision by the Council of Europe to make Bosnia and Herzegovina a member and fully meet the standards of a modern democracy.

=== Acts ===
Acting under Chapter VII of the United Nations Charter, the council reminded the authorities in Bosnia and Herzegovina and others of their responsibility to implement the Dayton Agreement. It emphasised the role of the High Representative for Bosnia and Herzegovina to monitor its implementation. It also attached importance to co-operation with the International Criminal Tribunal for the former Yugoslavia.

The security council commended the countries participating in SFOR to continue their operations for an additional twelve months; it would be extended beyond this date if warranted by the situation in the country. It also authorised the use of necessary measures, including that of the use of force and self-defense, to ensure compliance with the agreements and the safety and freedom of movement of SFOR personnel. At the same time, the mandate of UNMIBH, which included that of the International Police Task Force (IPTF), was extended until 31 December 2002. Countries were urged to provide training, equipment and support to local police forces in Bosnia and Herzegovina and the Secretary-General Kofi Annan was requested to submit reports from the High Representative for Bosnia and Herzegovina.

The resolution further welcomed the European Union's offer to establish a European Union Police Mission in Bosnia and Herzegovina from 1 January 2003 to succeed UNMIBH.

== See also ==
- Bosnian War
- Dayton Agreement
- List of United Nations Security Council Resolutions 1401 to 1500 (2002–2003)
- Yugoslav Wars
