= United Nations Security Council Resolution 1722 =

UN Security Council Resolution 1722
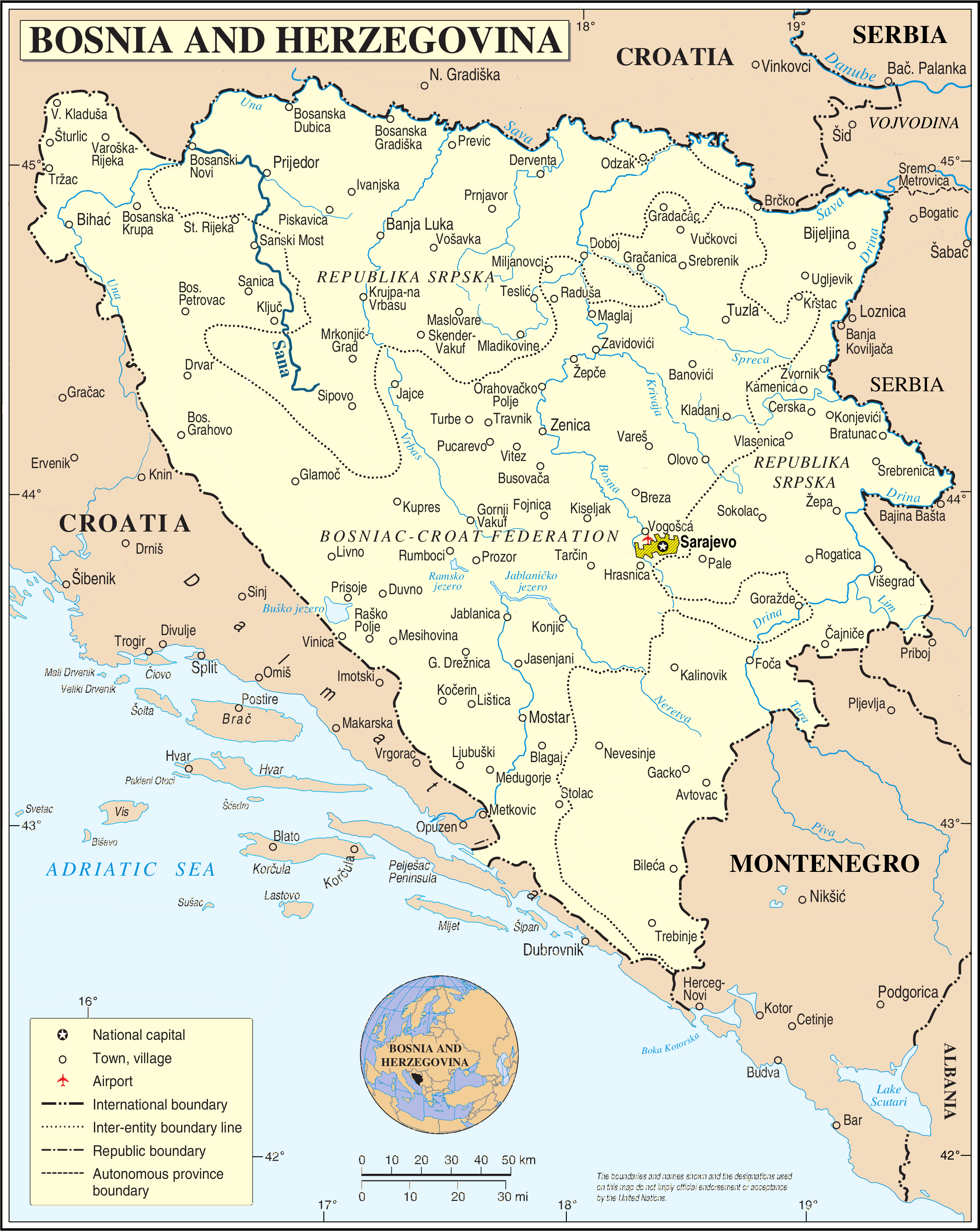
- Bosnia and Herzegovina
- Date: 21 November 2006
- Meeting no.: 5,567
- Code: S/RES/1722 (Document)
- Subject: The situation in Bosnia and Herzegovina
- Voting summary: 15 voted for; None voted against; None abstained
- Result: Adopted

Security Council composition
- Permanent members: China; France; Russia; United Kingdom; United States
- Non-permanent members: Argentina; Rep. of the Congo; Denmark; Ghana; Greece; Japan; Peru; Qatar; Slovakia; Tanzania

United Nations Security Council Resolution 1722, adopted unanimously on November 21, 2006, after recalling previous resolutions on the conflicts in the former Yugoslavia, including resolutions 1031 (1995), 1088 (1996), 1423 (2002), 1491 (2003), 1551 (2004), 1575 (2004) and 1639 (2005), the Council extended the mandate of EUFOR Althea in Bosnia and Herzegovina as a legal successor to the Stabilisation Force (SFOR) for a further twelve months.

== Resolution ==
=== Observations ===
The Security Council emphasised the importance of the full implementation of the Dayton Agreement (General Framework Agreement) and welcomed contributions from SFOR, the Organization for Security and Co-operation in Europe and other international organisations. The situation continued to constitute a threat to peace and security and the Council was determined to promote a peaceful resolution of the conflict. Furthermore, it welcomed the increased engagement of the European Union in Bosnia and Herzegovina, and of the latter's progress towards the European Union.

=== Acts ===
Acting under Chapter VII of the United Nations Charter, the Council reminded the parties to the Dayton Agreement of their responsibility to implement the agreement. It emphasised the role of the High Representative for Bosnia and Herzegovina to monitor its implementation. It also attached importance to co-operation with the International Criminal Tribunal for the former Yugoslavia.

The Security Council commended the countries participating in EUFOR and extended the mission for another twelve months. It also authorised the use of necessary measures, including that of the use of force and self-defense, to ensure compliance with the agreements and the safety and freedom of movement of EUFOR or NATO personnel. All agreements would apply to the follow-on mission.

The resolution further welcomed the deployment of the European Union's Police Mission in Bosnia and Herzegovina since January 1, 2003, which had replaced the United Nations Mission in Bosnia and Herzegovina. Finally, it requested the Secretary-General Kofi Annan to report on progress the parties had made towards the implementation of their peace agreements.

== See also ==
- Bosnian War
- Dayton Agreement
- List of United Nations Security Council Resolutions 1701 to 1800 (2006–2008)
- Yugoslav Wars
