= United Nations Security Council Resolution 1948 =

UN Security Council Resolution 1948
- EUFOR Althea ribbon bar
- Date: 18 November 2010
- Meeting no.: 6,426
- Code: S/RES/1948 (Document)
- Subject: The situation in Bosnia and Herzegovina
- Voting summary: 15 voted for; None voted against; None abstained
- Result: Adopted

Security Council composition
- Permanent members: China; France; Russia; United Kingdom; United States
- Non-permanent members: Austria; Bosnia–Herzegovina; Brazil; Gabon; Japan; Lebanon; Mexico; Nigeria; Turkey; Uganda

United Nations Security Council Resolution 1948, adopted unanimously on November 18, 2010, after recalling previous resolutions on the conflicts in the former Yugoslavia, including resolutions 1031 (1995), 1088 (1996), 1423 (2002), 1491 (2003), 1551 (2004), 1575 (2004), 1639 (2005), 1722 (2006), 1764 (2007), 1785 (2007), 1845 (2008), 1869 (2008) and 1895 (2009), the Council extended the mandate of EUFOR Althea in Bosnia and Herzegovina for an additional year until November 18, 2011.

The extension was requested by the High Representative for Bosnia and Herzegovina, Valentin Inzko.

== Resolution ==
=== Observations ===
The Security Council emphasised the political settlement to the conflicts in the former Yugoslavia, reiterating that the return of refugees was essential for peace. It noted that some aspects of the Dayton Agreement had not been implemented fifteen years after its signing, and emphasised Bosnia and Herzegovina's progress towards Euro-Atlantic integration and its transition to a modern democratic European country.

The preamble of the resolution welcomed the European foreign ministers decision to continue to provide support for Operation Athlea and the successful holding of general elections in October 2010.

=== Acts ===
Acting under Chapter VII of the United Nations Charter, the resolution highlighted that the responsibility of the implementation of the Dayton Agreement rested with the authorities in Bosnia and Herzegovina in the process of rebuilding society and a viable state. The parties to the agreement were reminded to comply with the agreement and co-operate with other entities in its implementation, including the International Criminal Tribunal for the former Yugoslavia.

States participating in EUFOR were authorised to continue operations for a further 12 months as the legal successor to SFOR. It welcomed a decision by NATO Headquarters to assist in the implementation of the agreement. Member States were also authorised to take all necessary measures to facilitate the implementation of and compliance with Annexes 1-A and 2 of the peace agreement, protect troops and ensure compliance with rules governing the use of airspace over the country.

== See also ==
- Bosnian War
- Dayton Agreement
- List of United Nations Security Council Resolutions 1901 to 2000 (2009–2011)
- Yugoslav Wars
