= United Nations Security Council Resolution 1357 =

UN Security Council Resolution 1357
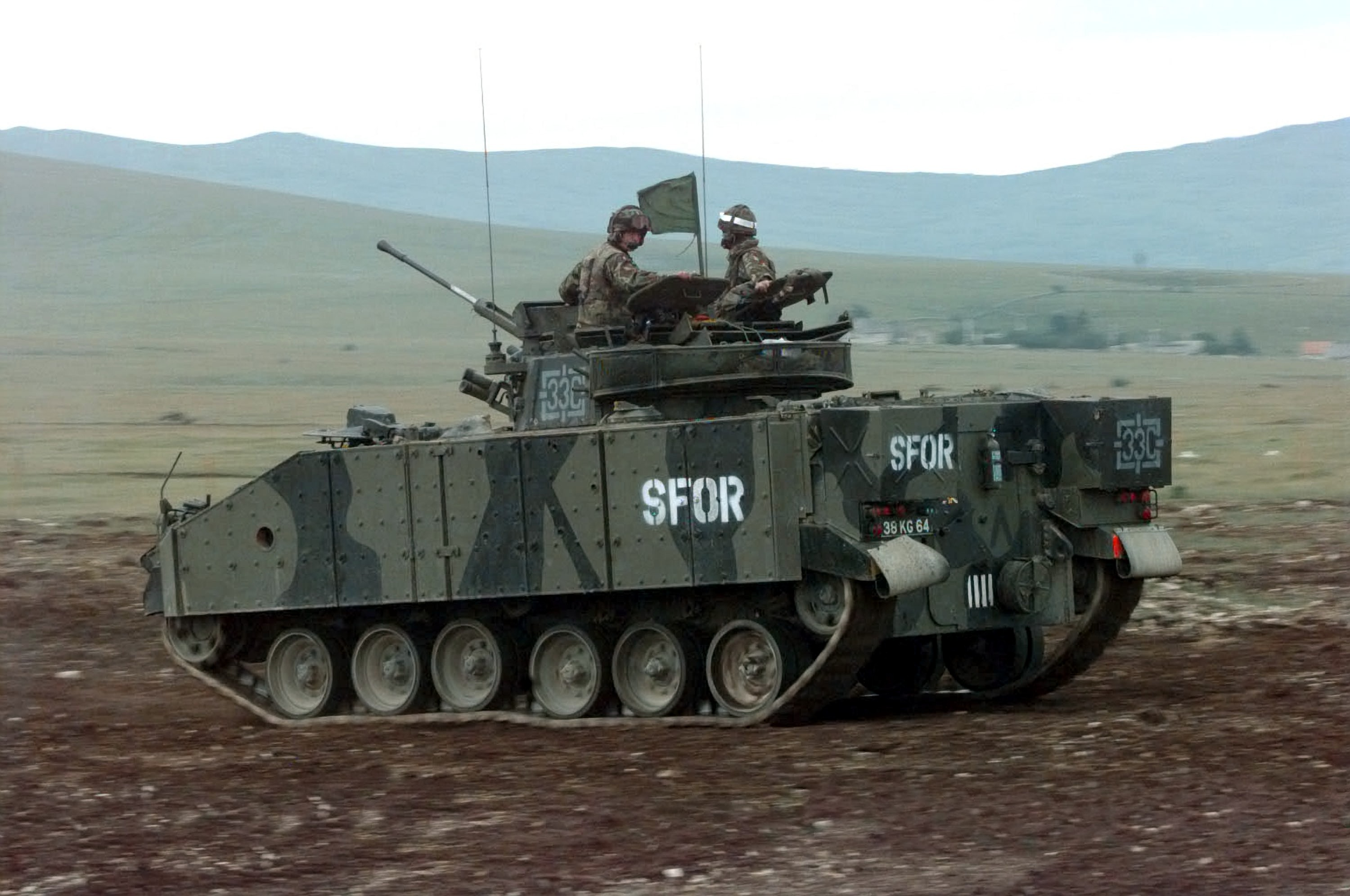
- SFOR tank
- Date: 21 June 2001
- Meeting no.: 4,333
- Code: S/RES/1357 (Document)
- Subject: The situation in Bosnia and Herzegovina
- Voting summary: 15 voted for; None voted against; None abstained
- Result: Adopted

Security Council composition
- Permanent members: China; France; Russia; United Kingdom; United States
- Non-permanent members: Bangladesh; Colombia; Ireland; Jamaica; Mali; Mauritius; Norway; Singapore; Tunisia; Ukraine

United Nations Security Council resolution 1357, adopted unanimously on 21 June 2001, after recalling resolutions 1031 (1995), 1035 (1995), 1088 (1996), 1103 (1997), 1107 (1997), 1144 (1997), 1168 (1998), 1174 (1998), 1184 (1998), 1247 (1999) and 1305 (2000), the council extended the mandate of the United Nations Mission in Bosnia and Herzegovina (UNMIBH) for a period until 21 June 2002 and authorised states participating in the NATO-led Stabilisation Force (SFOR) to continue to do so for a further twelve months.

The security council underlined the importance of the Dayton Agreement (General Framework Agreement) and the importance that Croatia, the Federal Republic of Yugoslavia (Serbia and Montenegro) and other states had to play in the peace process in Bosnia and Herzegovina. The situation continued to constitute a threat to peace and security and the council was determined to promote a peaceful resolution of the conflict.

Acting under Chapter VII of the United Nations Charter, the council reminded the authorities in Bosnia and Herzegovina and others of their responsibility to implement the Dayton Agreement. It emphasised the role of the High Representative for Bosnia and Herzegovina to monitor its implementation. It also attached importance to co-operation with the International Criminal Tribunal for the former Yugoslavia.

The security council commended the countries participating in SFOR to continue their operations for an additional twelve months; it would be extended beyond this date if warranted by the situation in the country. It also authorised the use of necessary measures, including that of the use of force and self-defense, to ensure compliance with the agreements and the safety and freedom of movement of SFOR personnel. At the same time, the mandate of UNMIBH, which included that of the International Police Task Force (IPTF), was extended until 21 June 2002. Countries were urged to provide training, equipment and support to local police forces in Bosnia and Herzegovina and the Secretary-General Kofi Annan was requested to submit reports from the High Representative for Bosnia and Herzegovina.

== See also ==
- Bosnian War
- Dayton Agreement
- List of United Nations Security Council Resolutions 1301 to 1400 (2000–2002)
- Yugoslav Wars
