= United Nations Security Council Resolution 1396 =

UN Security Council Resolution 1396
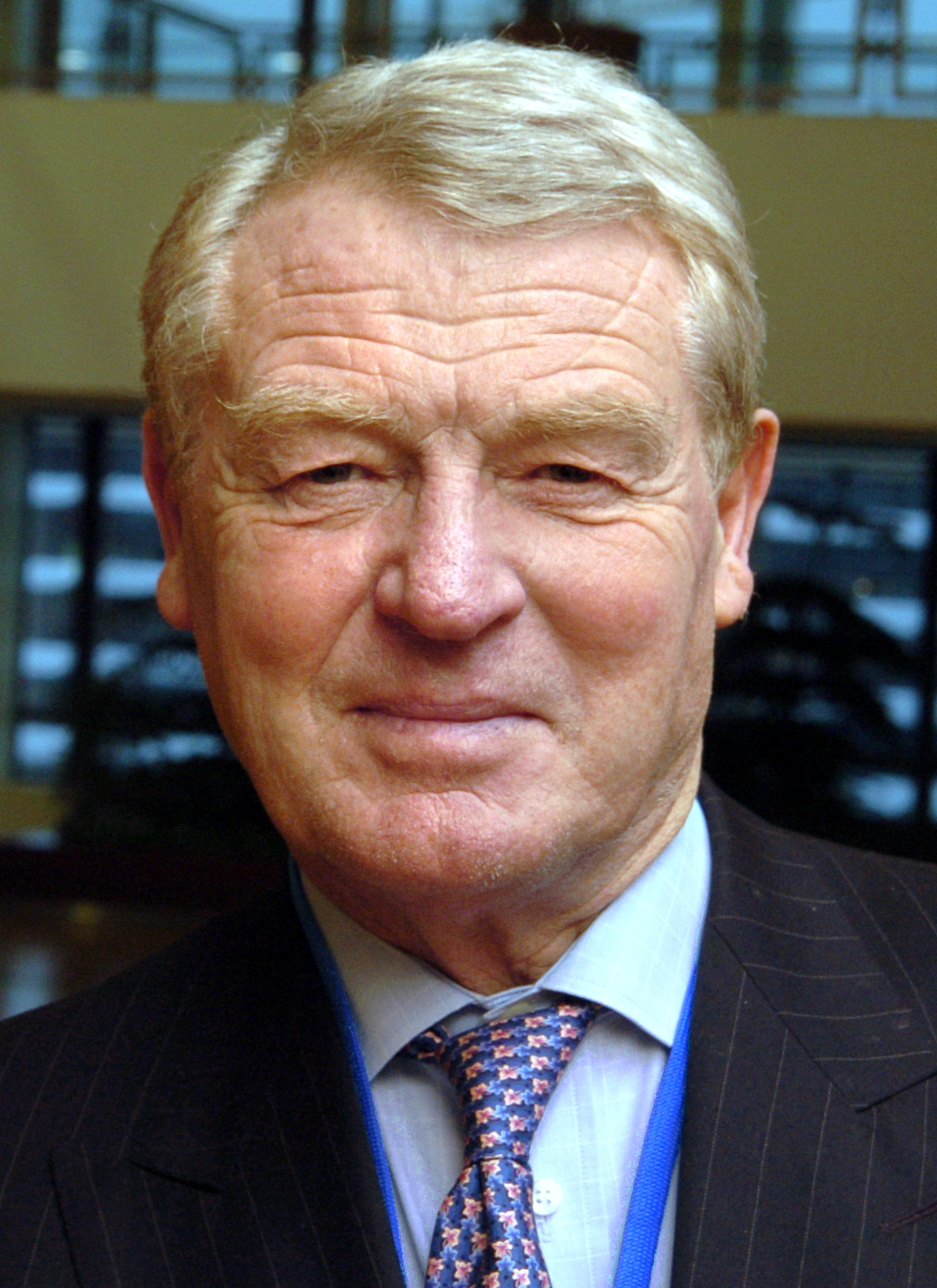
- Paddy Ashdown in 2005
- Date: 5 March 2002
- Meeting no.: 4,484
- Code: S/RES/1396 (Document)
- Subject: The situation in Bosnia and Herzegovina
- Voting summary: 15 voted for; None voted against; None abstained
- Result: Adopted

Security Council composition
- Permanent members: China; France; Russia; United Kingdom; United States
- Non-permanent members: Bulgaria; Cameroon; Colombia; Guinea; Ireland; Mauritius; Mexico; Norway; Singapore; Syria

In United Nations Security Council resolution 1396, adopted unanimously on 5 March 2002, after recalling resolutions 1031 (1995), 1088 (1996), 1112 (1997), 1256 (1999) and 1357 (2001) on the situation in Bosnia and Herzegovina, the Council welcomed the acceptance by the Steering Board of the Peace Implementation Council on 28 February 2002 of the offer of the European Union to provide a European Union Police Mission (EUPM) to succeed the United Nations Mission in Bosnia and Herzegovina (UNMIBH) from 1 January 2003.

The Security Council recalled the Dayton Agreement and preparations for the transition from UNMIBH at the end of its mandate. It agreed to the designation of Paddy Ashdown to succeed Wolfgang Petritsch as High Representative for Bosnia and Herzegovina and appreciated the work of the latter for his achievements.

The resolution welcomed the establishment of the EUPM from 1 January 2003 to follow on from the end of UNMIBH's mandate as part of a co-ordinated rule of law programme. It encouraged co-ordination among the EUPM, UNMIBH and High Representative to ensure a transition of responsibilities from the International Police Task Force to the EUPM and welcomed the streamlining of the international civilian implementation effort in Bosnia and Herzegovina. The EUPM was to monitor and train the Bosnian Police and to create or reform sustainable institutions to EU standards.

Finally, Resolution 1396 reaffirmed the importance and final authority the Council attached to the role of the High Representative in co-ordinating activities of organisations and agencies in the implementation of the Dayton Agreement.

== See also ==
- Bosnian War
- List of United Nations Security Council Resolutions 1301 to 1400 (2000–2002)
- Yugoslav Wars
