= United Nations Security Council Resolution 1421 =

UN Security Council Resolution 1421
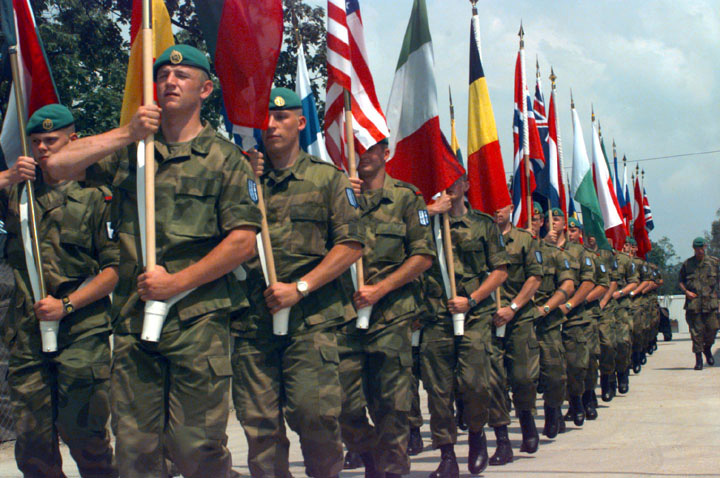
- SFOR troops
- Date: 3 July 2002
- Meeting no.: 4,566
- Code: S/RES/1421 (Document)
- Subject: The situation in Bosnia and Herzegovina
- Voting summary: 15 voted for; None voted against; None abstained
- Result: Adopted

Security Council composition
- Permanent members: China; France; Russia; United Kingdom; United States
- Non-permanent members: Bulgaria; Cameroon; Colombia; Guinea; Ireland; Mauritius; Mexico; Norway; Singapore; Syria

United Nations Security Council resolution 1421, adopted unanimously on 3 July 2002, after recalling all previous resolutions on the conflict in the former Yugoslavia, particularly resolutions 1357 (2001), 1418 (2002) and 1420 (2002), the council, acting under Chapter VII of the United Nations Charter, extended the mandate of the United Nations Mission in Bosnia and Herzegovina (UNMIBH) and authorised the continuation of the Stabilisation Force (SFOR) until 15 July 2002.

As with Resolution 1420 (2002), the United States expressed its concern at "politicised prosecutions" of its peacekeepers before the International Criminal Court (ICC), whose jurisdiction the country did not accept and Statute came into force on 1 July 2002. The extension of UNMIBH's mandate allowed more time for consultations regarding immunity for United Nations personnel who were nationals of countries that did not recognise the ICC.

== See also ==
- Bosnian War
- List of United Nations Security Council Resolutions 1401 to 1500 (2002–2003)
- Yugoslav Wars
