= United Nations Security Council Resolution 1174 =

UN Security Council Resolution 1174
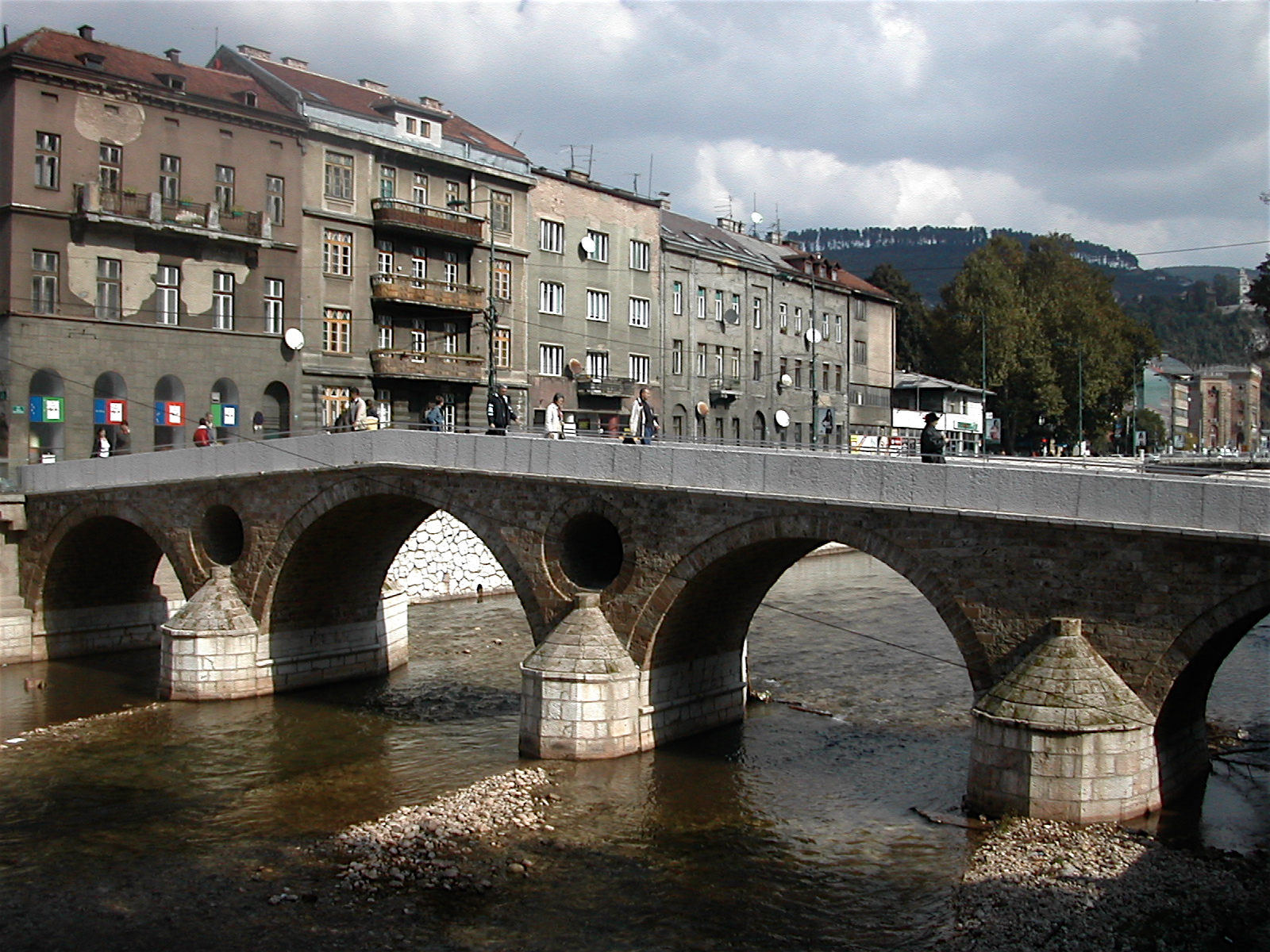
- Latin Bridge in Sarajevo
- Date: 15 June 1998
- Meeting no.: 3,892
- Code: S/RES/1174 (Document)
- Subject: The situation in Bosnia and Herzegovina
- Voting summary: 15 voted for; None voted against; None abstained
- Result: Adopted

Security Council composition
- Permanent members: China; France; Russia; United Kingdom; United States
- Non-permanent members: Bahrain; Brazil; Costa Rica; Gabon; Gambia; Japan; Kenya; Portugal; Slovenia; Sweden

United Nations Security Council resolution 1174, adopted unanimously on 15 June 1998, after recalling resolutions 1031 (1995), 1035 (1995), 1088 (1996), 1103 (1997), 1107 (1997), 1144 (1997) and 1168 (1998), the Council extended the mandate of the United Nations Mission in Bosnia and Herzegovina (UNMIBH) for a period terminating on 21 June 1999 and authorised states participating in the NATO led Stabilisation Force (SFOR) to continue to do so for a further twelve months.

The Security Council underlined the importance of the Dayton Agreement (General Framework Agreement) and the importance that Croatia and the Federal Republic of Yugoslavia (Serbia and Montenegro) had to play in the peace process in Bosnia and Herzegovina. The return of displaced persons and refugees was crucial for lasting peace in the region, after the Secretary-General Kofi Annan reported that refugees had encountered violence when returning to their places of origin in Bosnia and Herzegovina.

Acting under Chapter VII of the United Nations Charter, the Council insisted on co-operation from all parties with the peace agreements and the International Criminal Tribunal for the former Yugoslavia (ICTY), reaffirming the role of the High Representative for Bosnia and Herzegovina during this process. It was recognised that the parties had authorised the present multinational force to use force if necessary to enforce Annex I of the peace agreements.

Member States participating in SFOR, established in Resolution 1088, were authorised to continue their operations for an additional twelve months; it would be extended beyond this date if warranted by the situation in the country. It also authorised the use of necessary measures, including that of the use of force and self-defense, to ensure compliance with the agreements and the safety and freedom of movement of SFOR personnel. At the same time, the mandate of UNMIBH, which included that of the International Police Task Force (IPTF), was extended until 21 June 1999. Countries were urged to provide training, equipment and support to local police forces in Bosnia and Herzegovina.

== See also ==
- Bosnian War
- Dayton Agreement
- List of United Nations Security Council Resolutions 1101 to 1200 (1997–1998)
- Yugoslav Wars
