= United Nations Security Council Resolution 1551 =

UN Security Council Resolution 1551
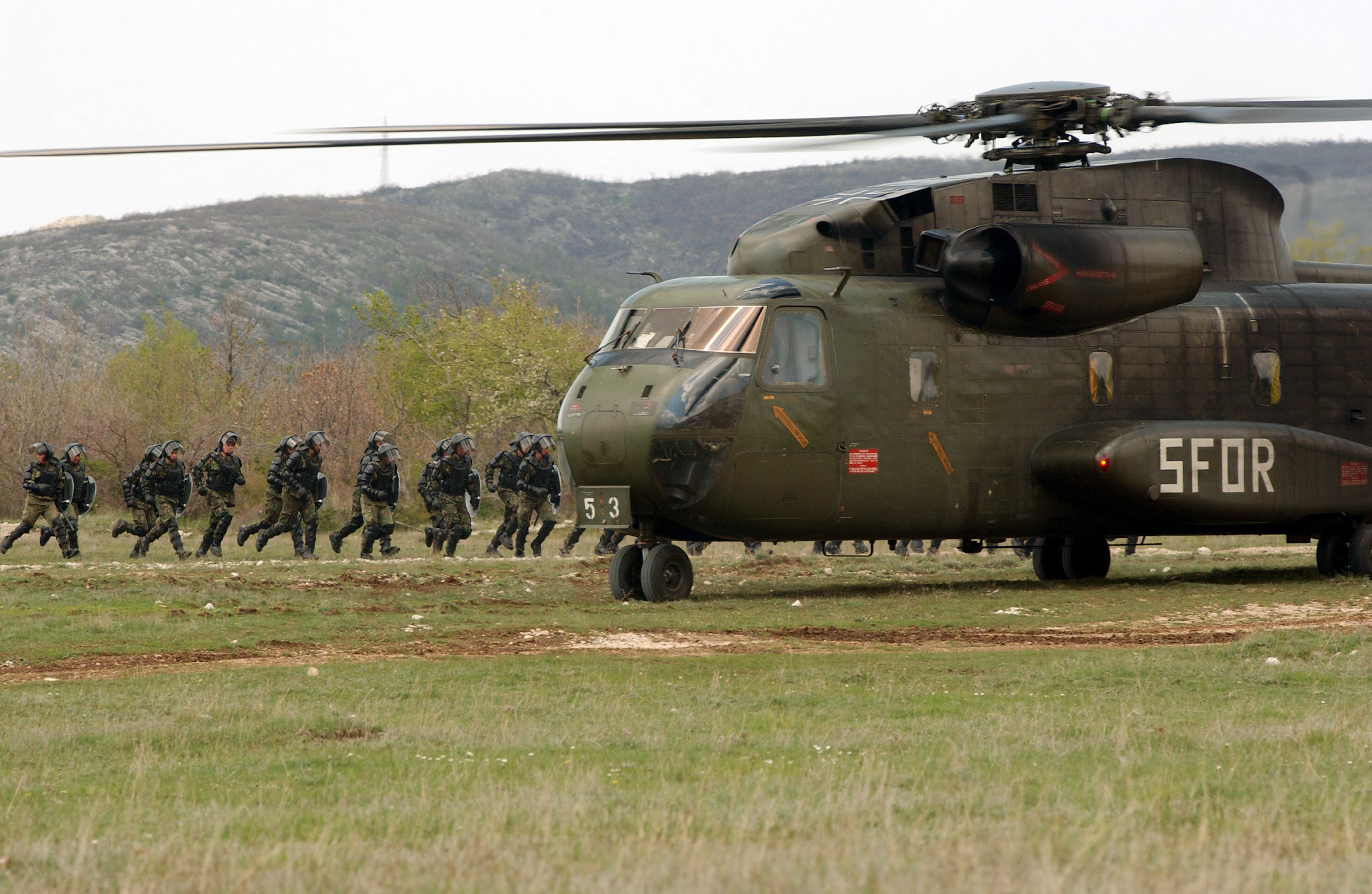
- SFOR helicopter
- Date: 9 July 2004
- Meeting no.: 5,001
- Code: S/RES/1551 (Document)
- Subject: The situation in Bosnia and Herzegovina
- Voting summary: 15 voted for; None voted against; None abstained
- Result: Adopted

Security Council composition
- Permanent members: China; France; Russia; United Kingdom; United States
- Non-permanent members: Algeria; Angola; Benin; Brazil; Chile; Germany; Pakistan; Philippines; Romania; Spain

United Nations Security Council resolution 1551, adopted unanimously on 9 July 2004, after recalling previous resolutions on the conflicts in the former Yugoslavia, including resolutions 1031 (1995), 1088 (1996), 1423 (2002) and 1491 (2003), the council extended the mandate of the Stabilisation Force (SFOR) in Bosnia and Herzegovina for a further period of six months and welcomed the deployment of EUFOR Althea at the end of the SFOR's mandate.

== Resolution ==
=== Observations ===
The Security Council emphasised the importance of the implementation of the Dayton Agreement (General Framework Agreement) and welcomed contributions from SFOR, the Organization for Security and Co-operation in Europe and other international organisations. The situation continued to constitute a threat to peace and security and the council was determined to promote a peaceful resolution of the conflict. Furthermore, it noted that the European Union was intending to launch a follow-on mission with a military component from December 2004.

=== Acts ===
Acting under Chapter VII of the United Nations Charter, the council reminded the parties to the Dayton Agreement of their responsibility to implement the agreement. It emphasised the role of the High Representative for Bosnia and Herzegovina to monitor its implementation. It also attached importance to co-operation with the International Criminal Tribunal for the former Yugoslavia.

The Security Council commended the countries participating in SFOR and authorised them to continue their operations for an additional six months; while it welcomed the establishment of a follow-on mission from December 2004 by the European Union. It also authorised the use of necessary measures, including that of the use of force and self-defense, to ensure compliance with the agreements and the safety and freedom of movement of SFOR personnel. All agreements would apply to the follow-on mission.

The resolution further welcomed the deployment of the European Union's Police Mission in Bosnia and Herzegovina since 1 January 2003, which had replaced the United Nations Mission in Bosnia and Herzegovina. Finally, it requested the Secretary-General Kofi Annan to report on progress the parties had made towards the implementation of their peace agreements.

== See also ==
- Bosnian War
- Dayton Agreement
- List of United Nations Security Council Resolutions 1501 to 1600 (2003–2005)
- Yugoslav Wars
