= United Nations Security Council Resolution 1256 =

UN Security Council Resolution 1256
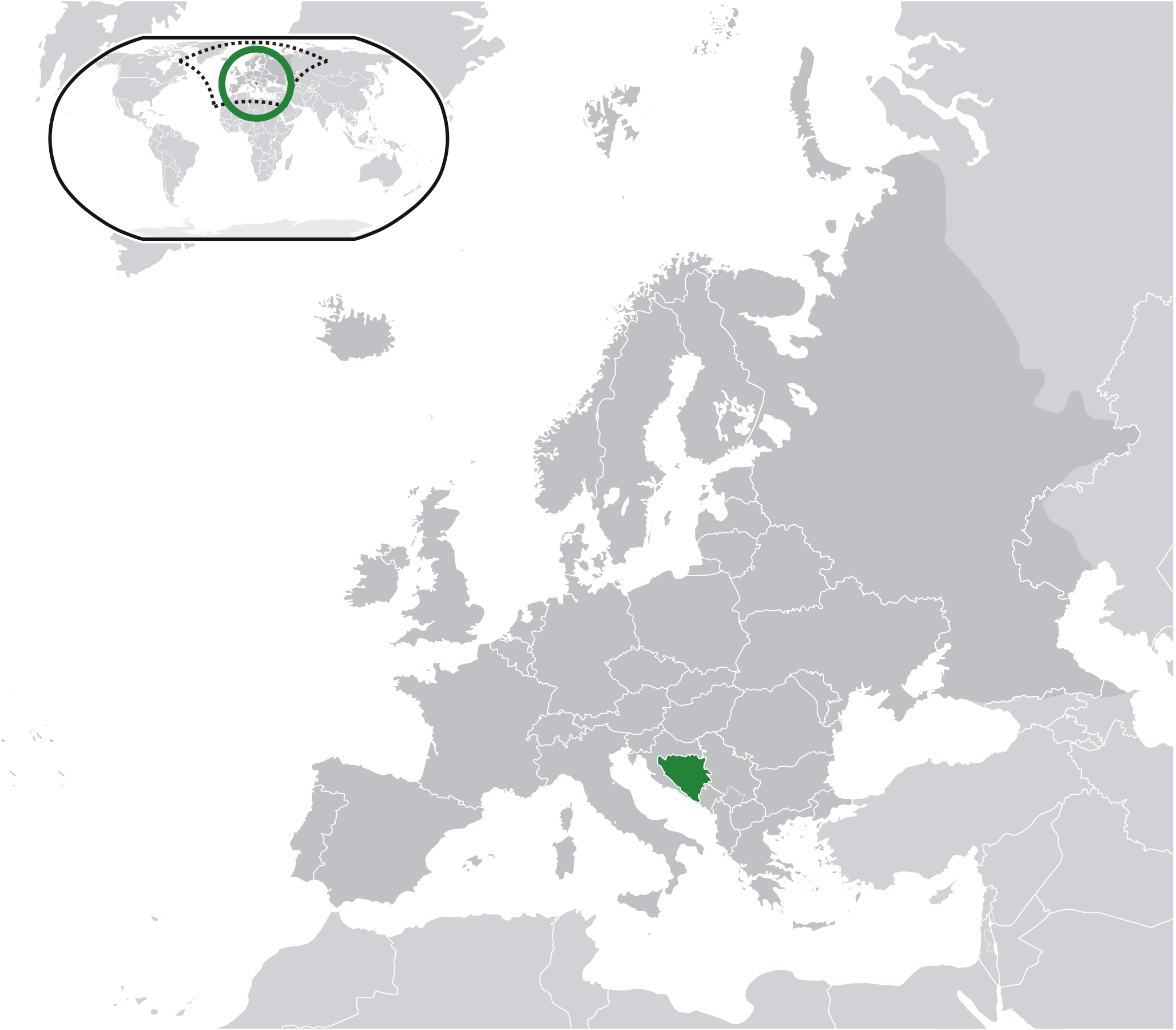
- Location of Bosnia and Herzegovina in Europe
- Date: 3 August 1999
- Meeting no.: 4,030
- Code: S/RES/1256 (Document)
- Subject: The situation in Bosnia and Herzegovina
- Voting summary: 15 voted for; None voted against; None abstained
- Result: Adopted

Security Council composition
- Permanent members: China; France; Russia; United Kingdom; United States
- Non-permanent members: Argentina; Bahrain; Brazil; Canada; Gabon; Gambia; Malaysia; Namibia; Netherlands; Slovenia

United Nations Security Council resolution 1256, adopted unanimously on 3 August 1999, after recalling 1031 (1995), 1088 (1996) and 1112 (1997), the Council approved the appointment of Wolfgang Petritsch as High Representative for Bosnia and Herzegovina.

Recalling the Dayton Agreement, the Council expressed appreciation for the work of Carlos Westendorp as High Representative and agreed for Wolfgang Petritsch to succeed him. It reaffirmed the role of the High Representative in monitoring the implementation of the Dayton Agreement and co-ordinating the activities of civilian organisations and agencies that were working to implement the Agreement. Finally, it also reaffirmed the role of the High Representative as the final authority regarding the interpretation of Annex 10 on the civilian implementation of the Peace Agreement.

== See also ==
- Bosnian War
- List of United Nations Security Council Resolutions 1201 to 1300 (1998–2000)
- Yugoslav Wars
