= United Nations Security Council Resolution 1420 =

UN Security Council Resolution 1420
- UNMIBH ribbon bar
- Date: 30 June 2002
- Meeting no.: 4,564
- Code: S/RES/1420 (Document)
- Subject: The situation in Bosnia and Herzegovina
- Voting summary: 15 voted for; None voted against; None abstained
- Result: Adopted

Security Council composition
- Permanent members: China; France; Russia; United Kingdom; United States
- Non-permanent members: Bulgaria; Cameroon; Colombia; Guinea; Ireland; Mauritius; Mexico; Norway; Singapore; Syria

United Nations Security Council resolution 1420, adopted unanimously on 30 June 2002, after recalling all previous resolutions on the conflict in the former Yugoslavia, particularly resolutions 1357 (2001) and 1418 (2002), the council, acting under Chapter VII of the United Nations Charter, extended the mandate of the United Nations Mission in Bosnia and Herzegovina (UNMIBH) and authorised the continuation of the Stabilisation Force until 3 July 2002.

The resolution, sponsored by France, Republic of Ireland, Norway and the United Kingdom, was adopted following a veto of a previous draft resolution by the United States extending UNMIBH's mandate until the end of 2002. The veto was imposed after concerns regarding the entry into force of the Rome Statute of the International Criminal Court on 1 July 2002 and its ability to prosecute personnel from nations not party to the Statute, of which the United States was not party to.

== See also ==
- Bosnian War
- List of United Nations Security Council Resolutions 1401 to 1500 (2002–2003)
- Yugoslav Wars
