= United Nations Security Council Resolution 1168 =

UN Security Council Resolution 1168
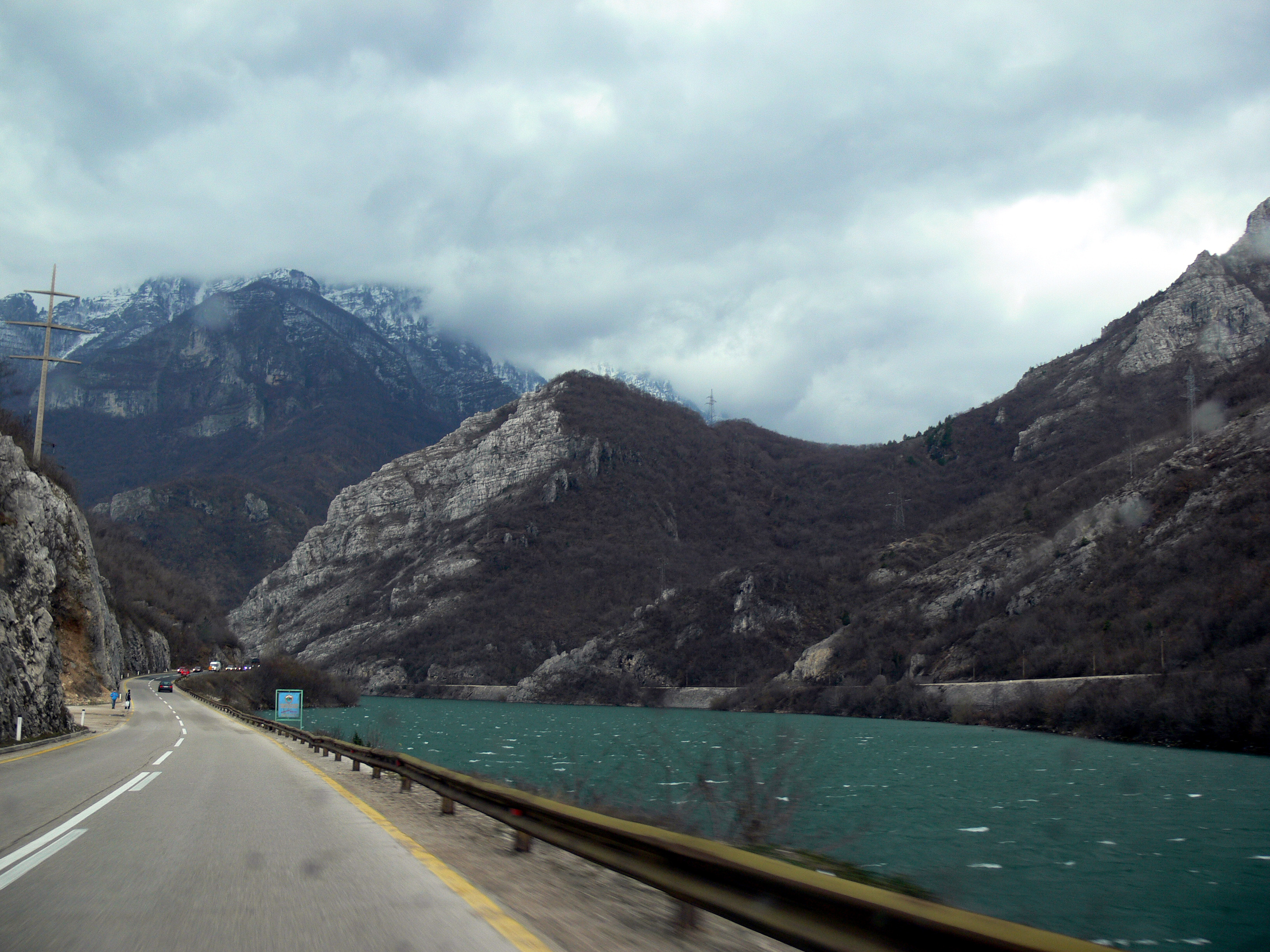
- Jablanica lake in Bosnia and Herzegovina
- Date: 21 May 1998
- Meeting no.: 3,883
- Code: S/RES/1168 (Document)
- Subject: The situation in Bosnia and Herzegovina
- Voting summary: 15 voted for; None voted against; None abstained
- Result: Adopted

Security Council composition
- Permanent members: China; France; Russia; United Kingdom; United States
- Non-permanent members: Bahrain; Brazil; Costa Rica; Gabon; Gambia; Japan; Kenya; Portugal; Slovenia; Sweden

United Nations Security Council resolution 1168, adopted unanimously on 21 May 1998, after recalling resolutions 1031 (1995), 1035 (1995), 1088 (1996), 1103 (1997), 1107 (1997) and 1144 (1997), the Council strengthened the International Police Task Force (IPTF) in Bosnia and Herzegovina by up to 30 posts to a total strength of 2,057.

There was a need for more training for local police in Bosnia and Herzegovina, particularly in terms of incident management, corruption, organised crime and drug control. The Council acknowledged that reform of the judicial reform and police reform were closely linked.

The resolution authorised an additional increase in the number of IPTF posts by up to 30 personnel, with a total strength of 2,057, as part of the United Nations Mission in Bosnia and Herzegovina (UNMIBH). It supported improvements to the structure of IPTF and encouraged Member States to contribute equipment, training and other assistance for local police forces in Bosnia and Herzegovina. The resolution concluded by recognising that the establishment of an indigenous public security capability was essential for strengthening the rule of law in the country and legal reform.

== See also ==
- Bosnian War
- Dayton Agreement
- List of United Nations Security Council Resolutions 1101 to 1200 (1997–1998)
- Yugoslav Wars
- List of United Nations Security Council Resolutions related to the conflicts in former Yugoslavia
