= United Nations Security Council Resolution 1491 =

UN Security Council Resolution 1491
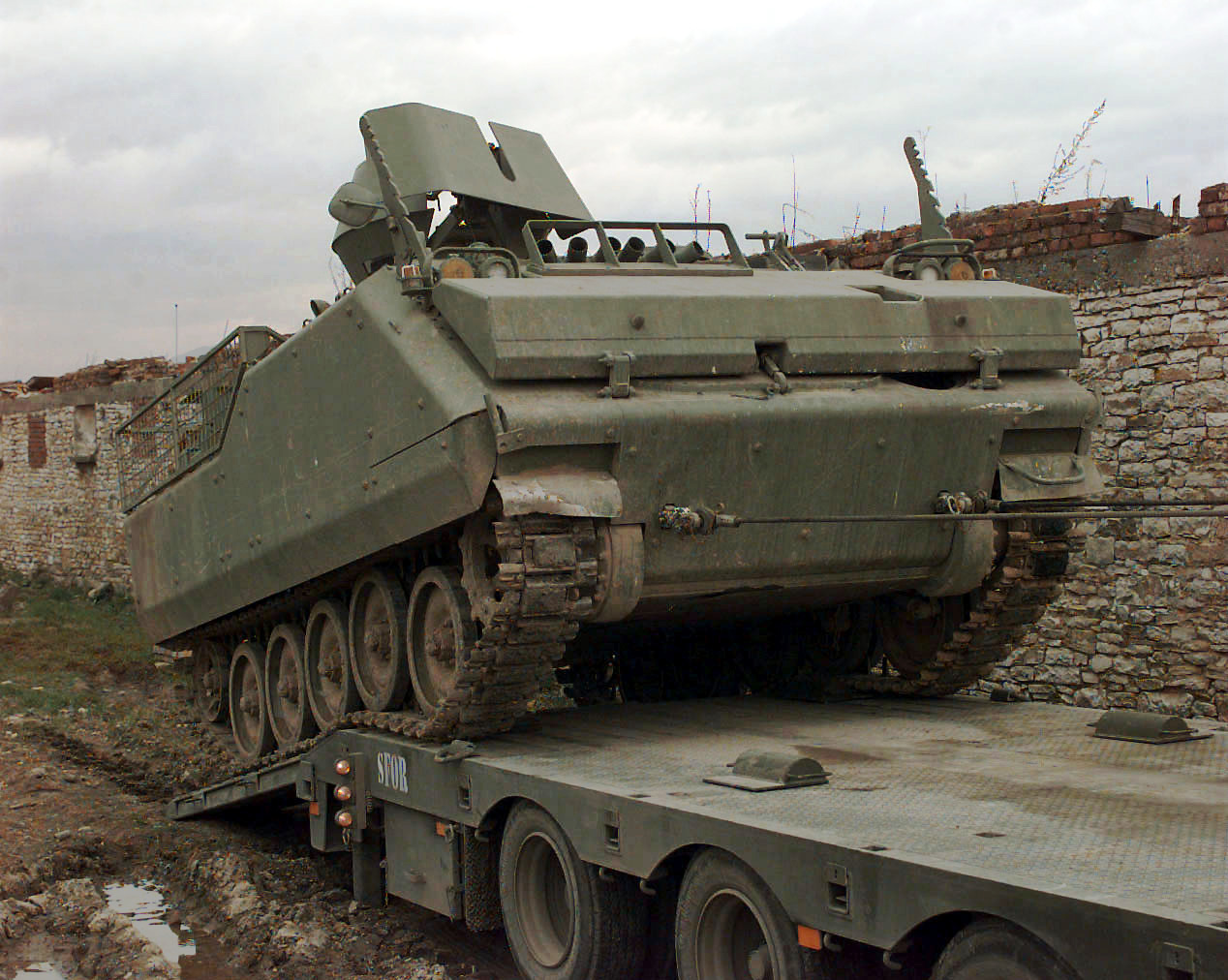
- SFOR units
- Date: 11 July 2003
- Meeting no.: 4,786
- Code: S/RES/1491 (Document)
- Subject: The situation in Bosnia and Herzegovina
- Voting summary: 15 voted for; None voted against; None abstained
- Result: Adopted

Security Council composition
- Permanent members: China; France; Russia; United Kingdom; United States
- Non-permanent members: Angola; Bulgaria; Chile; Cameroon; Germany; Guinea; Mexico; Pakistan; Spain; Syria

United Nations Security Council resolution 1491, adopted unanimously on 11 July 2003, after recalling resolutions 1031 (1995), 1088 (1996) and 1423 (2002) on the conflicts in the former Yugoslavia, the Council extended the mandate of the Stabilisation Force (SFOR) in Bosnia and Herzegovina for a further period of twelve months.

== Resolution ==
=== Observations ===
The Security Council emphasised the importance of the implementation of the Dayton Agreement (General Framework Agreement) and welcomed contributions from SFOR, the Organization for Security and Co-operation in Europe and other international organisations. The situation continued to constitute a threat to peace and security and the council was determined to promote a peaceful resolution of the conflict.

=== Acts ===
Acting under Chapter VII of the United Nations Charter, the Council reminded the parties to the Dayton Agreement of their responsibility to implement the agreement. It emphasised the role of the High Representative for Bosnia and Herzegovina to monitor its implementation. It also attached importance to co-operation with the International Criminal Tribunal for the former Yugoslavia.

The Security Council commended the countries participating in SFOR and authorised them to continue their operations for an additional twelve months; it would be extended beyond this date if warranted by the situation in the country. It also authorised the use of necessary measures, including that of the use of force and self-defense, to ensure compliance with the agreements and the safety and freedom of movement of SFOR personnel. Countries were urged to provide training, equipment and support to local police forces in Bosnia and Herzegovina and the Secretary-General Kofi Annan was requested to submit reports from the High Representative for Bosnia and Herzegovina.

The resolution further welcomed the deployment of the European Union's Police Mission in Bosnia and Herzegovina since 1 January 2003, which had succeeded the United Nations Mission in Bosnia and Herzegovina.

== See also ==
- Bosnian War
- Dayton Agreement
- List of United Nations Security Council Resolutions 1401 to 1500 (2002–2003)
- Yugoslav Wars
