= United Nations Security Council Resolution 1112 =

UN Security Council Resolution 1112
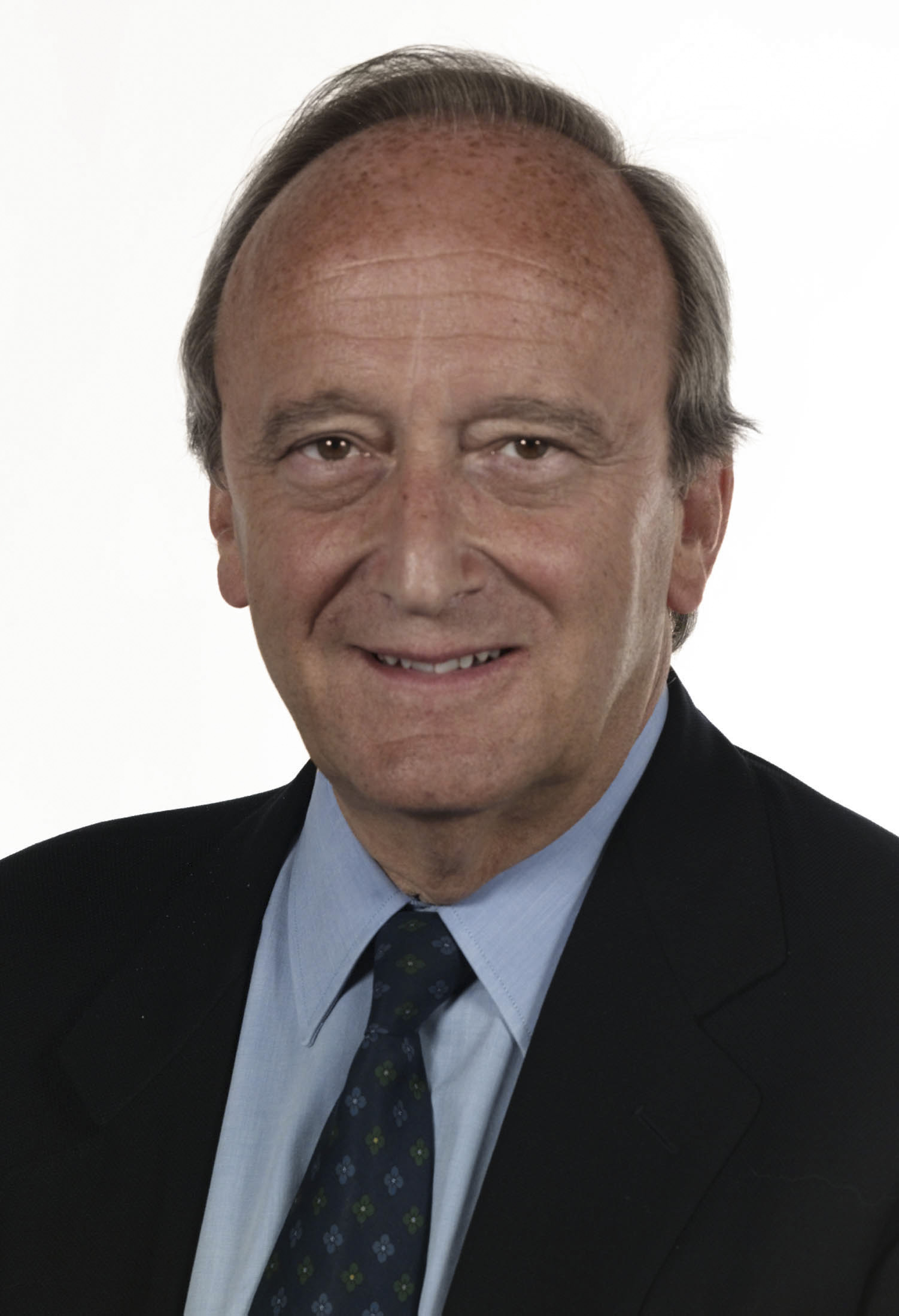
- Carlos Westendorp
- Date: 12 June 1997
- Meeting no.: 3,787
- Code: S/RES/1112 (Document)
- Subject: The situation in Bosnia and Herzegovina
- Voting summary: 15 voted for; None voted against; None abstained
- Result: Adopted

Security Council composition
- Permanent members: China; France; Russia; United Kingdom; United States
- Non-permanent members: Chile; Costa Rica; Egypt; Guinea-Bissau; Japan; Kenya; South Korea; Poland; Portugal; Sweden

United Nations Security Council resolution 1112, adopted unanimously on 12 June 1997, after recalling 1031 (1995) and 1088 (1996), the Council approved the appointment of Carlos Westendorp as High Representative for Bosnia and Herzegovina.

Recalling the Dayton Agreement, the Council expressed appreciation for the work of Carl Bildt as High Representative and agreed for Carlos Westendorp to succeed him. It reaffirmed the role of the High Representative in monitoring the implementation of the Dayton Agreement and co-ordinating the activities of civilian organisations and agencies that were working to implement the Agreement. Finally, it also reaffirmed the role of the High Representative as the final authority regarding the interpretation of Annex 10 on the civilian implementation of the Peace Agreement.

== See also ==
- Bosnian War
- List of United Nations Security Council Resolutions 1101 to 1200 (1997–1998)
- Yugoslav Wars
