= United Nations Security Council Resolution 1418 =

UN Security Council Resolution 1418
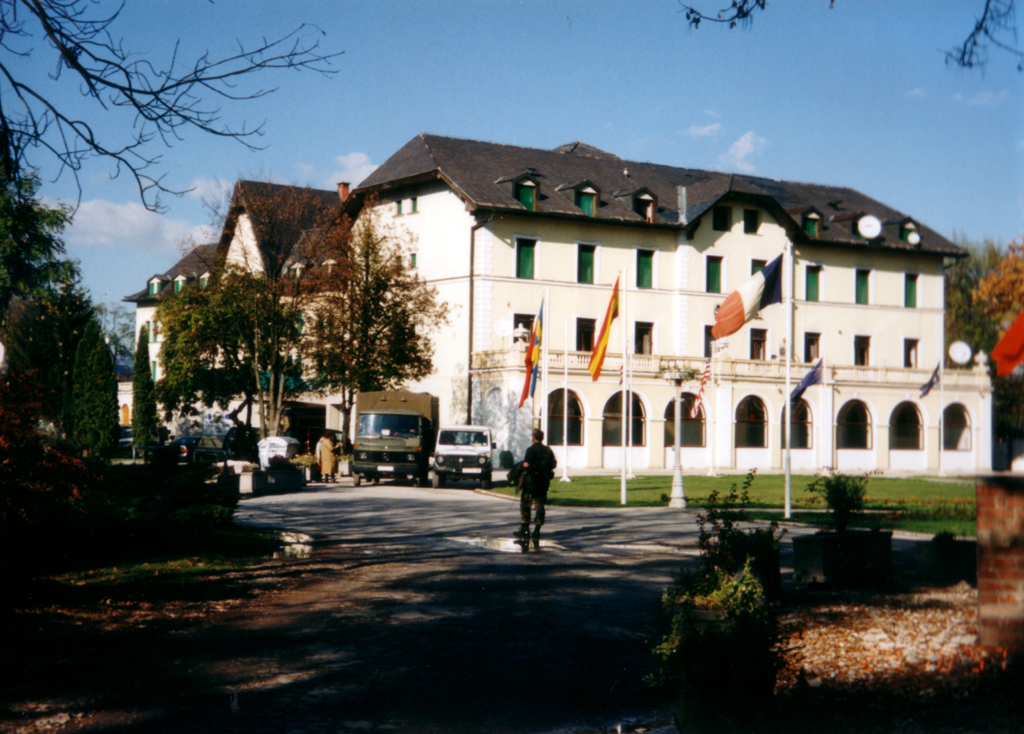
- SFOR headquarters (1997)
- Date: 21 June 2002
- Meeting no.: 4,558
- Code: S/RES/1418 (Document)
- Subject: The situation in Bosnia and Herzegovina
- Voting summary: 15 voted for; None voted against; None abstained
- Result: Adopted

Security Council composition
- Permanent members: China; France; Russia; United Kingdom; United States
- Non-permanent members: Bulgaria; Cameroon; Colombia; Guinea; Ireland; Mauritius; Mexico; Norway; Singapore; Syria

United Nations Security Council resolution 1418, adopted unanimously on 21 June 2002, after recalling all previous resolutions on the conflict in the former Yugoslavia, particularly Resolution 1357 (2001), the council, acting under Chapter VII of the United Nations Charter, extended the mandate of the United Nations Mission in Bosnia and Herzegovina (UNMIBH) and authorised the continuation of the Stabilisation Force until 30 June 2002.

It was one of several extensions of UNMIBH in this period, to allow more time for informal consultations concerning UNMIBH's mandate.

== See also ==
- Bosnian War
- List of United Nations Security Council Resolutions 1401 to 1500 (2002–2003)
- Yugoslav Wars
