= United Nations Security Council Resolution 1184 =

UN Security Council Resolution 1184
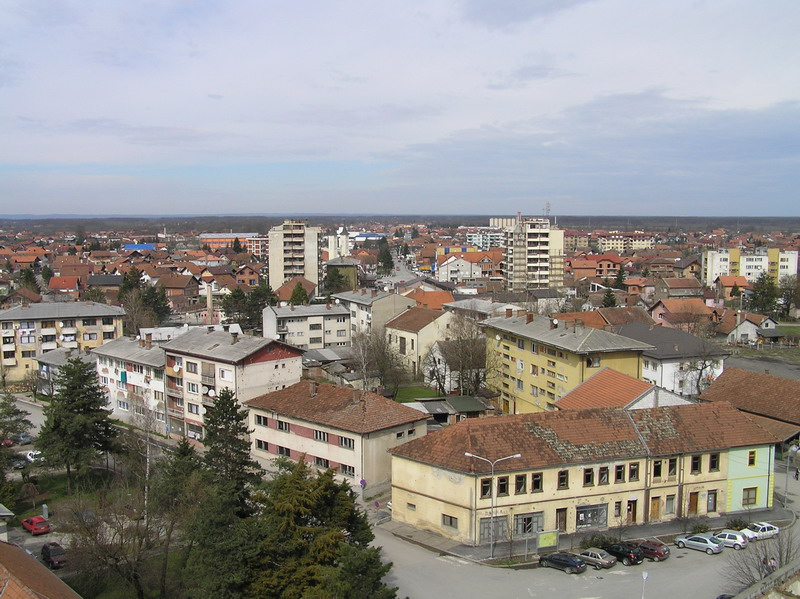
- Odžak in northern Bosnia and Herzegovina
- Date: 16 July 1998
- Meeting no.: 3,909
- Code: S/RES/1184 (Document)
- Subject: The situation in Bosnia and Herzegovina
- Voting summary: 15 voted for; None voted against; None abstained
- Result: Adopted

Security Council composition
- Permanent members: China; France; Russia; United Kingdom; United States
- Non-permanent members: Bahrain; Brazil; Costa Rica; Gabon; Gambia; Japan; Kenya; Portugal; Slovenia; Sweden

United Nations Security Council resolution 1184, adopted unanimously on 16 July 1998, after recalling previous resolutions concerning the conflicts in the former Yugoslavia, particularly resolutions 1168 (1998) and 1174 (1998), the council established a programme to monitor the court system in Bosnia and Herzegovina.

The security council approved the establishment of the court monitoring programme by the United Nations Mission in Bosnia and Herzegovina (UNMIBH) as part of an overall programme of legal reform proposed by the Office of the High Representative, Dayton Agreement and others. The authorities in Bosnia and Herzegovina were urged to co-operate with and support officials associated with the programme. The Secretary-General Kofi Annan was requested to keep the council informed on the progress of the monitoring programme as part of his reports on UNMIBH.

== See also ==
- Bosnian War
- Dayton Agreement
- List of United Nations Security Council Resolutions 1101 to 1200 (1997–1998)
- Yugoslav Wars
