= United Nations Security Council Resolution 1107 =

UN Security Council Resolution 1107
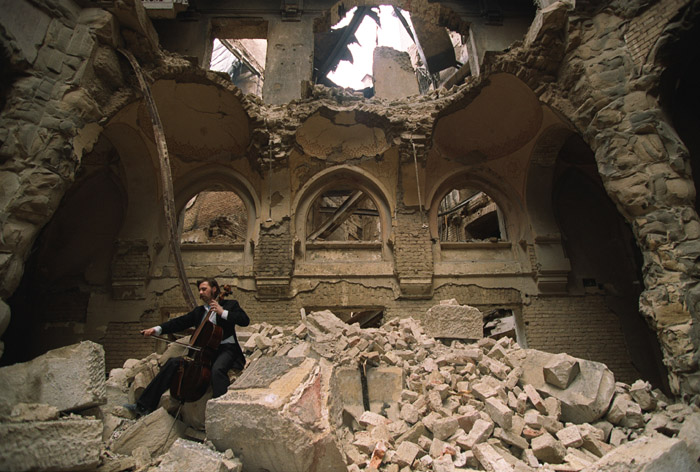
- Destroyed National Library in Sarajevo
- Date: 16 May 1997
- Meeting no.: 3,776
- Code: S/RES/1107 (Document)
- Subject: The situation in Bosnia and Herzegovina
- Voting summary: 15 voted for; None voted against; None abstained
- Result: Adopted

Security Council composition
- Permanent members: China; France; Russia; United Kingdom; United States
- Non-permanent members: Chile; Costa Rica; Egypt; Guinea-Bissau; Japan; Kenya; South Korea; Poland; Portugal; Sweden

United Nations Security Council resolution 1107, adopted unanimously on 16 May 1997, after recalling Resolution 1103 (1997) on the United Nations Mission in Bosnia and Herzegovina (UNMIBH) and United Nations International Police Task Force (UN-IPTF) in Bosnia and Herzegovina, the Council authorised a further increase in the number of police personnel of UNMIBH.

The Security Council recalled the Dayton Agreement and increased the size of the police component of UNMIBH by 120 personnel, following a recommendation by the Secretary-General Kofi Annan concerning the tasks of the UN-IPTF. Member States were urged to provide qualified police monitors and other forms of assistance to the UN-IPTF and in support of the Dayton Agreement.

== See also ==
- Bosnian War
- List of United Nations Security Council Resolutions 1101 to 1200 (1997–1998)
- Yugoslav Wars
