= United Nations Security Council Resolution 1144 =

UN Security Council Resolution 1144
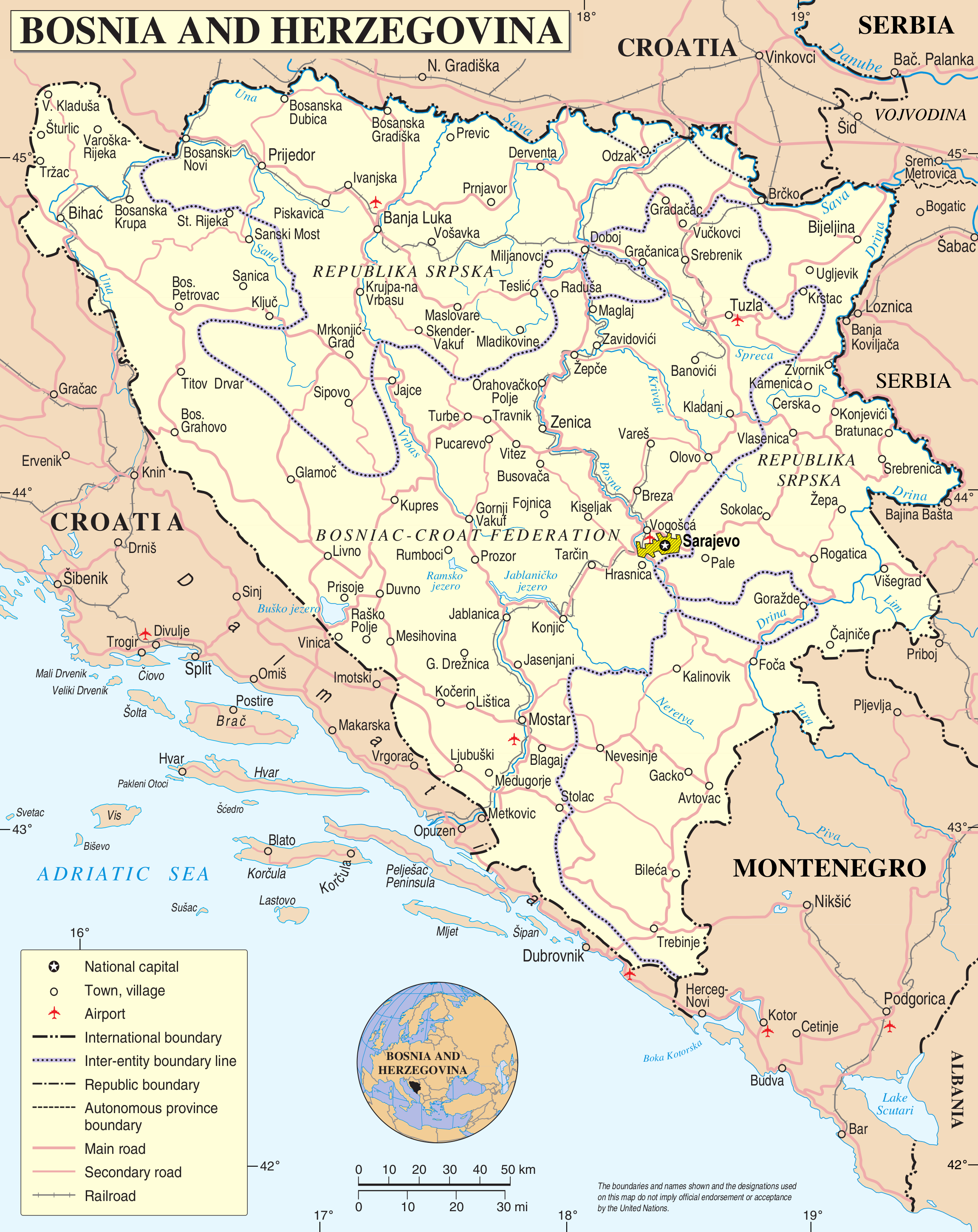
- Bosnia and Herzegovina
- Date: 19 December 1997
- Meeting no.: 3,842
- Code: S/RES/1144 (Document)
- Subject: The situation in Bosnia and Herzegovina
- Voting summary: 15 voted for; None voted against; None abstained
- Result: Adopted

Security Council composition
- Permanent members: China; France; Russia; United Kingdom; United States
- Non-permanent members: Chile; Costa Rica; Egypt; Guinea-Bissau; Japan; Kenya; South Korea; Poland; Portugal; Sweden

United Nations Security Council resolution 1144, adopted unanimously on 19 December 1997, after recalling Resolution 1103 (1997) on the United Nations Mission in Bosnia and Herzegovina (UNMIBH) and United Nations International Police Task Force (UN-IPTF) in Bosnia and Herzegovina, the Council extended the mandate of both until 21 June 1998.

The Council recognised that the UNMIBH mission and especially the IPTF for its important work in Bosnia and Herzegovina, including police restructuring, training, weapons inspections, promoting freedom of movement and assistance in the elections. The presence of IPTF monitors was dependent on security arrangements and a credible international military force.

UNMIBH's mandate was extended with the prospect of further renewal unless there were changes to the security arrangements provided by the Stabilisation Force. Support was given to the recommendations of the Bonn Peace Implementation Conference and the Secretary-General Kofi Annan was encouraged to carry out a restructuring of IPTF and to keep the Council informed on its progress and report every three months on the mandate of UNMIBH as a whole. Other measures included training the police to deal with crowd control, refugee returns, organised crime, corruption, terrorism and smuggling. Member States were urged to provide training, equipment and other assistance to local police forces.

Finally, the resolution paid tribute to the victims of a helicopter crash on 17 September 1997, which included members of the Office of the High Representative, the IPTF and the bilateral assistance programme.

== See also ==
- Bosnian War
- Dayton Agreement
- List of United Nations Security Council Resolutions 1101 to 1200 (1997–1998)
- Yugoslav Wars
