= United Nations Security Council Resolution 1103 =

UN Security Council Resolution 1103
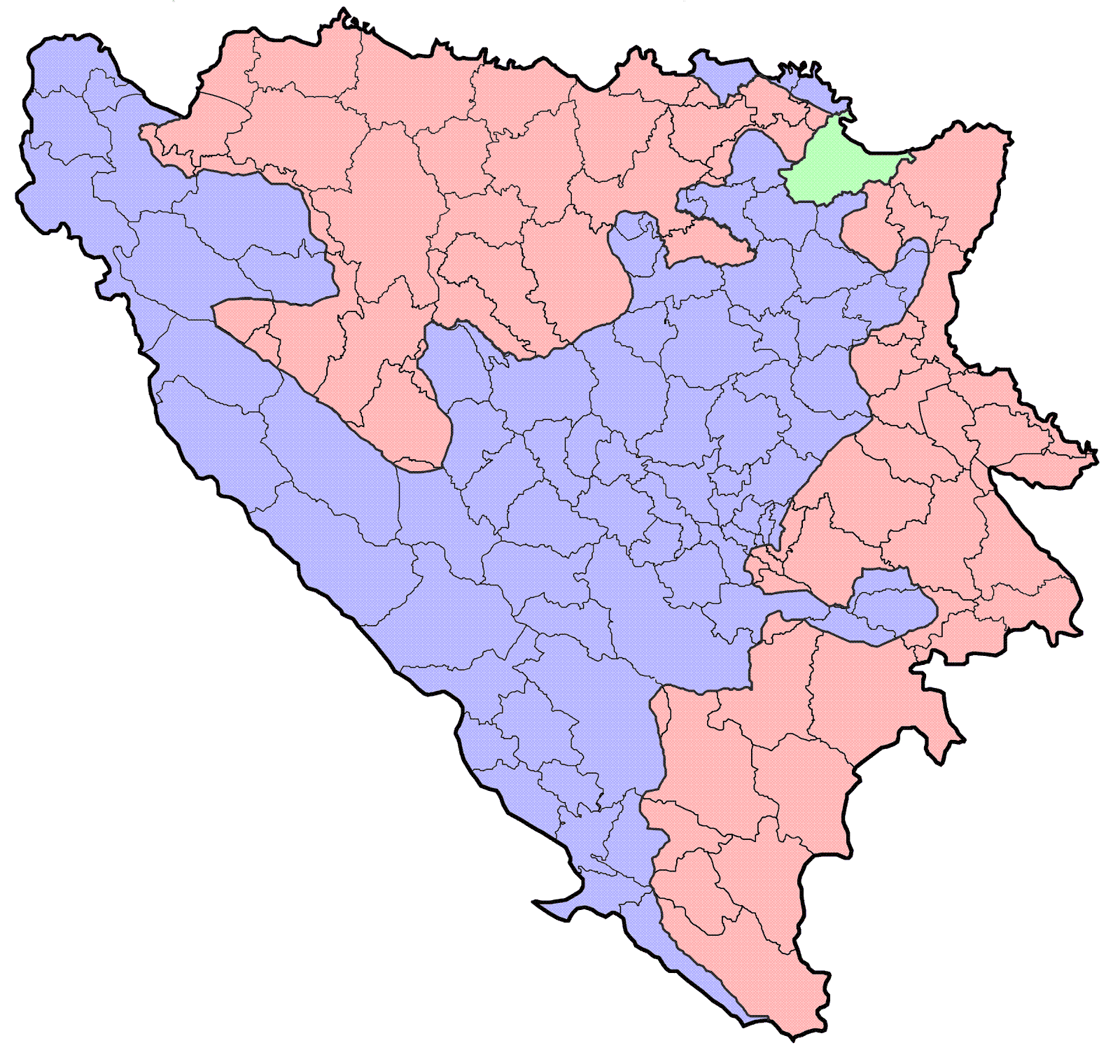
- Bosnia and Herzegovina: Republika Srpska Muslim-Croat Federation Brčko District
- Date: 31 March 1997
- Meeting no.: 3,760
- Code: S/RES/1103(1997) (Document)
- Subject: The situation in Bosnia and Herzegovina
- Voting summary: 15 voted for; None voted against; None abstained
- Result: Adopted

Security Council composition
- Permanent members: China; France; Russia; United Kingdom; United States
- Non-permanent members: Chile; Costa Rica; Egypt; Guinea-Bissau; Japan; Kenya; South Korea; Poland; Portugal; Sweden

United Nations Security Council resolution 1103, adopted unanimously on 31 March 1997, after recalling all resolutions on the conflicts in the former Yugoslavia and in particular resolutions 1035 (1995) and 1088 (1996), the Council authorised an increase in the strength of the United Nations Mission in Bosnia and Herzegovina (UNMIBH) in Bosnia and Herzegovina.

The Security Council reiterated that it was important that the Dayton Agreement was fully implemented, especially the provisions on co-operation with the International Criminal Tribunal for the former Yugoslavia. On 14 February 1997, the arbitration tribunal had ruled on the disputed Brčko District between the two states of Bosnia and Herzegovina.

The resolution then authorised an increase in the strength of UNMIBH by 186 police and 11 civilian personnel on a recommendation by the Secretary-General so that it could carry out its mandate as described in Resolution 1088 (1996). All parties were invited to implement the peace agreement and to co-operate with the United Nations International Police Task Force (UN-IPTF). It was also important that the UN-IPTF co-operated with the Stabilisation Force, particularly in Brčko.

== See also ==
- Bosnian War
- List of United Nations Security Council Resolutions 1101 to 1200 (1997–1998)
- Yugoslav Wars
