= United Nations Security Council Resolution 1035 =

United Nations Security Council resolution

UN Security Council Resolution 1035
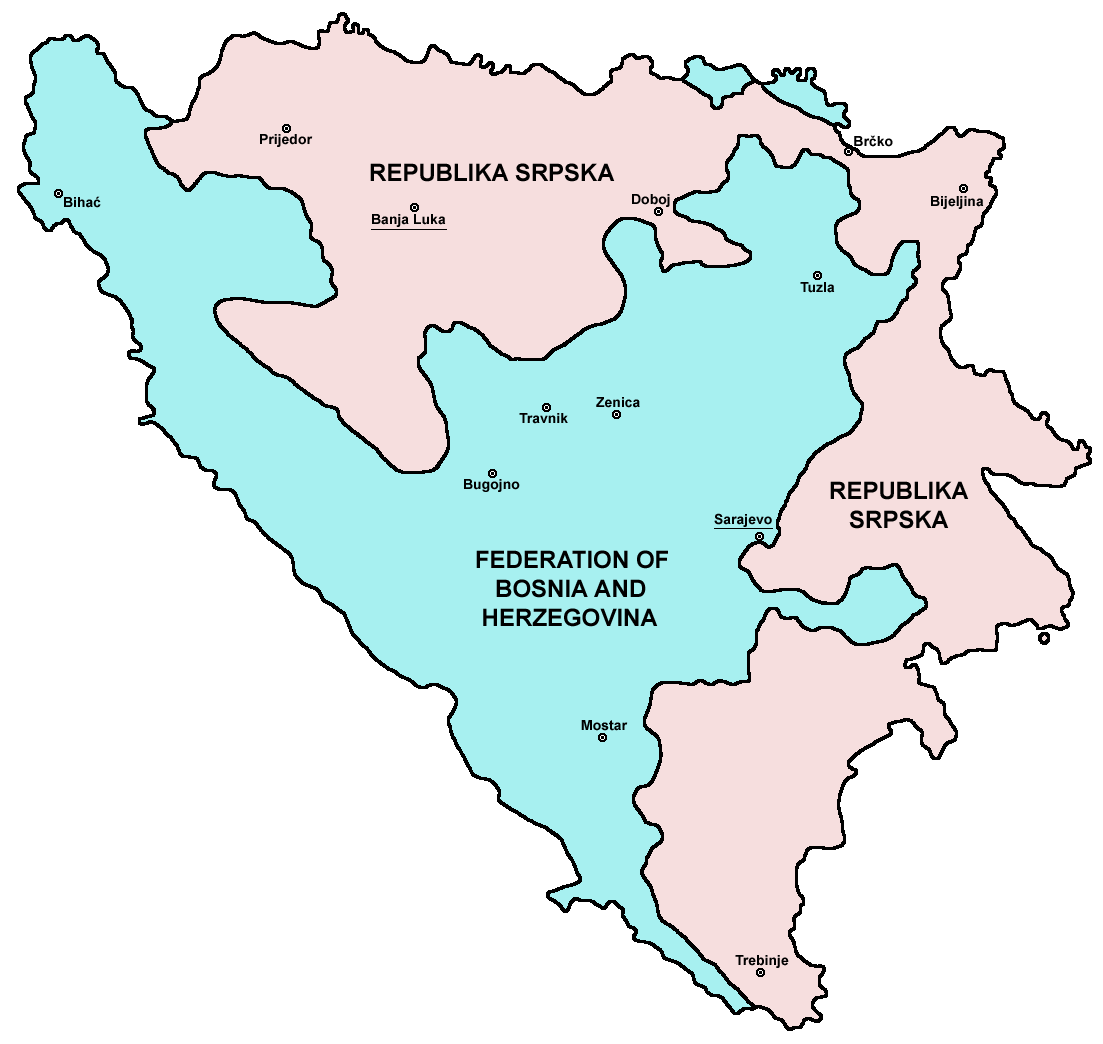
- Bosnia and Herzegovina
- Date: 21 December 1995
- Meeting no.: 3,613
- Code: S/RES/1035 (Document)
- Subject: Bosnia and Herzegovina
- Voting summary: 15 voted for; None voted against; None abstained
- Result: Adopted

Security Council composition
- Permanent members: China; France; Russia; United Kingdom; United States
- Non-permanent members: Argentina; Botswana; Czech Republic; Germany; Honduras; Indonesia; Italy; Nigeria; Oman; Rwanda

United Nations Security Council resolution 1035, adopted unanimously on 21 December 1995, after recalling Resolution 1031 (1995) and the Dayton Agreement, the Council authorised the establishment of a United Nations civilian police force, known as the International Police Task Force (IPTF) to carry out tasks in accordance with the agreement. It was part of the United Nations Mission in Bosnia and Herzegovina.

The IPTF would be established for a period of one year from the transfer of authority from the United Nations Protection Force to the multinational Implementation Force (IFOR). The Police Task Force and civilian office would be under the authority of the Secretary-General with guidance from the High Representative for Bosnia and Herzegovina.

The Secretary-General was requested to submit reports about the work of the IPTF and civilian office every three months.

The IPTF would have an initial strength of 1,721 in accordance with the Secretary-General Boutros Boutros-Ghali's report.

== See also ==
- Bosnian War
- Breakup of Yugoslavia
- Croatian War of Independence
- List of United Nations Security Council Resolutions 1001 to 1100 (1995–1997)
- Yugoslav Wars
- List of United Nations Security Council Resolutions related to the conflicts in former Yugoslavia
