= European Union Police Mission in Bosnia and Herzegovina =

- Abbreviation: EUPM
- Predecessor: United Nations Mission in Bosnia and Herzegovina
- Formation: 1 January 2003
- Dissolved: 30 June 2012

The European Union Police Mission in Bosnia and Herzegovina (EUPM) was the European Union's mission in Bosnia and Herzegovina that aided the local police organizations, and was one of a number of European Union Police Missions worldwide. It was the first such mission undertaken by the EU within the framework of the Common Foreign and Security Policy. The EUPM was the successor to the United Nations International Police Task Force (part of the United Nations Mission in Bosnia and Herzegovina) in Bosnia, whose term ended at the end of 2002.

The EUPM acted under co-ordination of the European Union Special Representative, who also served as High Representative for Bosnia and Herzegovina.

The mission was ended on 30 June 2012.

== Mission ==
The EUPM aimed to help in establishing a sustainable, professional and multi-ethnic police force. It assisted the local police, fighting large-scale organised crime and helping with police reform.

EUPM, the first mission launched under the Common Security and Defence Policy, was launched on 1 January 2003 for an initial period of three years. Following an invitation by the Bosnian authorities, the EU decided to establish a follow-on police mission with a modified mandate and size. EUPM II lasted for two years (from 1 January 2006 until 31 December 2007). It monitored, advised and inspected BiH police forces according to three main pillars, i.e. support to the police reform process, strengthening of police accountability and supporting the fight against organised crime.

At the end of 2007 the EU Police Mission was extended for another two years (from 1 January 2008 to 31 December 2009). During those two years, the mission continued its work with regard to the three same pillars, with particular emphasis on the fight against organised crime. EUPM also devoted particular attention to reinforcing cooperation between police and prosecutors.

== Sources ==
- Official EUPM site
