= United Nations Security Council Resolution 1088 =

UN Security Council Resolution 1088
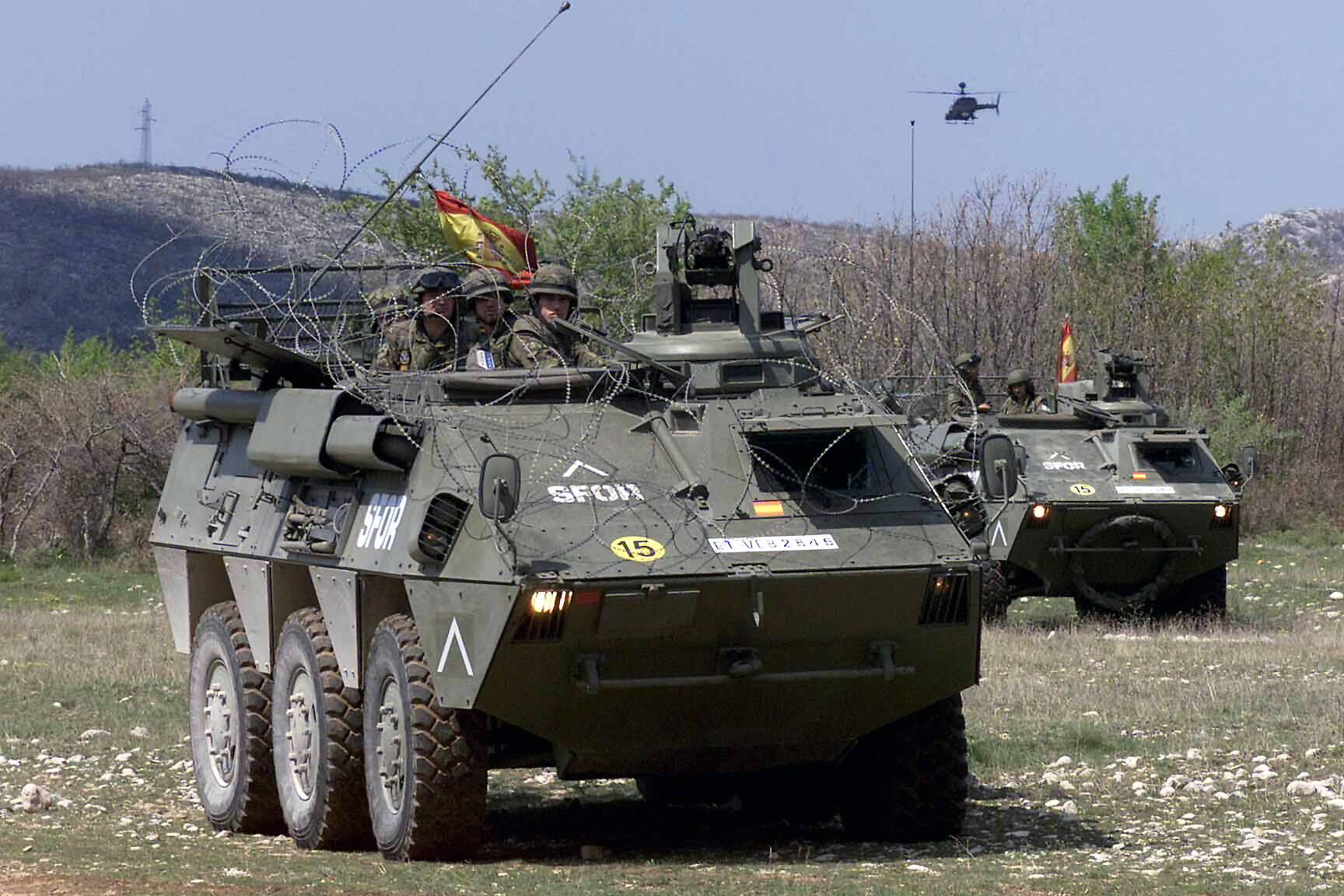
- Spanish SFOR units
- Date: 12 December 1996
- Meeting no.: 3,723
- Code: S/RES/1088 (Document)
- Subject: The situation in Bosnia and Herzegovina
- Voting summary: 15 voted for; None voted against; None abstained
- Result: Adopted

Security Council composition
- Permanent members: China; France; Russia; United Kingdom; United States
- Non-permanent members: Botswana; Chile; Egypt; Guinea-Bissau; Germany; Honduras; Indonesia; Italy; South Korea; Poland

United Nations Security Council resolution 1088, adopted unanimously on 12 December 1996, after recalling all resolutions on the conflicts in the former Yugoslavia and in particular resolutions 1031 (1995) and 1035 (1995), the council, acting under Chapter VII of the United Nations Charter, authorised the creation of the Stabilisation Force (SFOR) in Bosnia and Herzegovina to replace the Implementation Force (IFOR).

At a conference on Bosnia and Herzegovina there was an action plan to consolidate the peace process. Elections were held in the country in accordance with the Dayton Agreement, and institutions were established as set out in the Constitution of Bosnia and Herzegovina. Croatia and the Federal Republic of Yugoslavia (Serbia and Montenegro) had played a positive role in the peace process, and the efforts of all were welcomed, including the High Representative, IFOR and other international organisations.

The Security Council welcomed the mutual recognition between the successor states of former Yugoslavia and stressed the importance of the full normalisation of their diplomatic relations. They were reminded of their obligations under previous Security Council resolutions and for full implementation of the Dayton Agreement and co-operation with the United Nations.

Member States were authorised to establish the SFOR as a legal successor to IFOR for a period of 18 months. They were to take all necessary measures to ensure compliance with Annex 1-A of the Peace Agreement and its right to defend itself against attacks or threats. Bosnia and Herzegovina also asked for an extension of the United Nations police force (the International Police Task Force) that was part of the United Nations Mission in Bosnia and Herzegovina (UNMIBH). The mandate of UNMIBH was extended until 21 December 1997 and the Security Council demanded that all United Nations missions worked together.

== See also ==
- Bosnian War
- Breakup of Yugoslavia
- Croatian War of Independence
- List of United Nations Security Council Resolutions 1001 to 1100 (1995–1997)
- Yugoslav Wars
- List of United Nations Security Council Resolutions related to the conflicts in former Yugoslavia
