= United Nations Security Council Resolution 1031 =

UN Security Council Resolution 1031
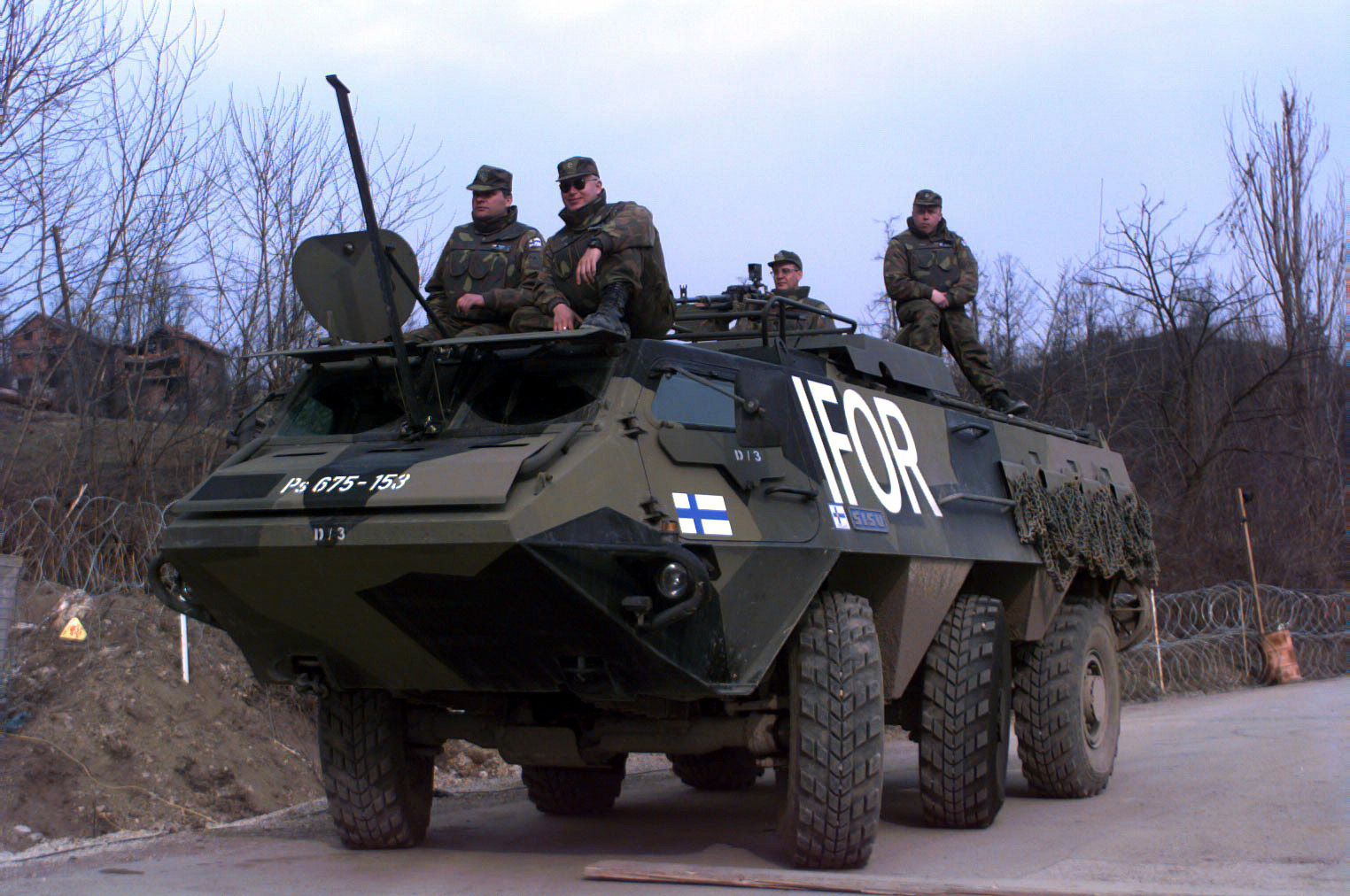
- Finnish IFOR troops in Bosnia and Herzegovina
- Date: 15 December 1995
- Meeting no.: 3,607
- Code: S/RES/1031 (Document)
- Subject: Bosnia and Herzegovina
- Voting summary: 15 voted for; None voted against; None abstained
- Result: Adopted

Security Council composition
- Permanent members: China; France; Russia; United Kingdom; United States
- Non-permanent members: Argentina; Botswana; Czech Republic; Germany; Honduras; Indonesia; Italy; Nigeria; Oman; Rwanda

United Nations Security Council resolution 1031, adopted unanimously on 15 December 1995, after recalling all previous resolutions on the conflicts in the former Yugoslavia, the council, acting under Chapter VII of the United Nations Charter, discussed the transfer of authority from the United Nations Protection Force (UNPROFOR) to the multinational Implementation Force (IFOR).

The Security Council still wanted a negotiated solution to the conflict in former Yugoslavia. On 14 December 1995 the General Framework Agreement, a peace agreement for Bosnia and Herzegovina, Croatia and the Federal Republic of Yugoslavia (Serbia and Montenegro) was signed. The decision to establish a Peace Implementation Council along with its Steering Board at a conference in London was welcomed.

The council was to keep the implementation of the Peace Agreement under review. The progress was made in recognition of the successor states in former Yugoslavia was welcomed. These countries also had to comply with international humanitarian law and cooperate with the International Criminal Tribunal for the former Yugoslavia (ICTY) in accordance with Resolution 827 (1993). The decision of the Organization for Security and Co-operation in Europe (OSCE) to put in place a programme of elections in Bosnia and Herzegovina was welcomed. The council also warmly received the parties' commitment to protecting human rights and the right of all refugees and displaced persons to return home. Furthermore, the creation of conditions for reconstruction and development in Bosnia and Herzegovina and for international assistance to be provided was stressed. There was also an agreement between all parties concerning arms control measures and stability.

The resolution then discussed IFOR. Member States were willing to contribute to a multinational force in order to implement the peace agreement for approximately one year, which the Security Council consented to. It was authorised to have control over the airspace of Bosnia and Herzegovina and the right to attack to defend itself. On the transfer of authority from UNPROFOR to IFOR, the authority to take measures imposed in resolutions 770 (1992), 781 (1992), 816 (1993), 836 (1993), 844 (1993) and 958 (1994) would be terminated, along with the provisions of Resolution 824 (1993) regarding safe areas would also be ended.

The participating countries in IFOR were asked to report every month. The Council endorsed the establishment of the post of High Representative for Bosnia and Herzegovina by the Dayton Agreement (hence appointed by Peace Implementation Council) and agreed the designation of Carl Bildt to the position to monitor the implementation of the peace agreement. The mandate of UNPROFOR would end as soon as the transfer of authority to IFOR had taken place, which occurred on 20 December 1995; the Secretary-General Boutros Boutros-Ghali's arrangements for the withdrawal of UNPROFOR were approved and he was also asked to report when that withdrawal was complete.

Resolution 1013 concluded with the Security Council recognising the unique, extraordinary and complex nature of the situation in Bosnia and Herzegovina, which prompted an extraordinary response.

== See also ==
- Bosnian War
- Breakup of Yugoslavia
- Croatian War of Independence
- Dayton Agreement
- List of United Nations Security Council Resolutions 1001 to 1100 (1995–1997)
- Yugoslav Wars
- List of United Nations Security Council Resolutions related to the conflicts in former Yugoslavia
