= United Nations Mission in Bosnia and Herzegovina =

United Nations' mission

- Abbreviation: UNMIBH
- Formation: 21 December 1995
- Legal status: Completed
- Parent organization: United Nations Security Council
- Website: UNMIBH

The United Nations Mission in Bosnia and Herzegovina (UNMIBH) was a United Nations peacekeeping mission formed under the United Nations Security Council Resolution 1035 on 21 December 1995. It completed its mandate on 31 December 2002, when it was succeeded by the European Union Police Mission in Bosnia and Herzegovina.

From the UNMIBH website:

UNMIBH’s mandate is to contribute to the establishment of the rule of law in Bosnia and Herzegovina by assisting in reforming and restructuring the local police, assessing the functioning of the existing judicial system, and monitoring and auditing the performance of the police and others involved in the maintenance of law and order.

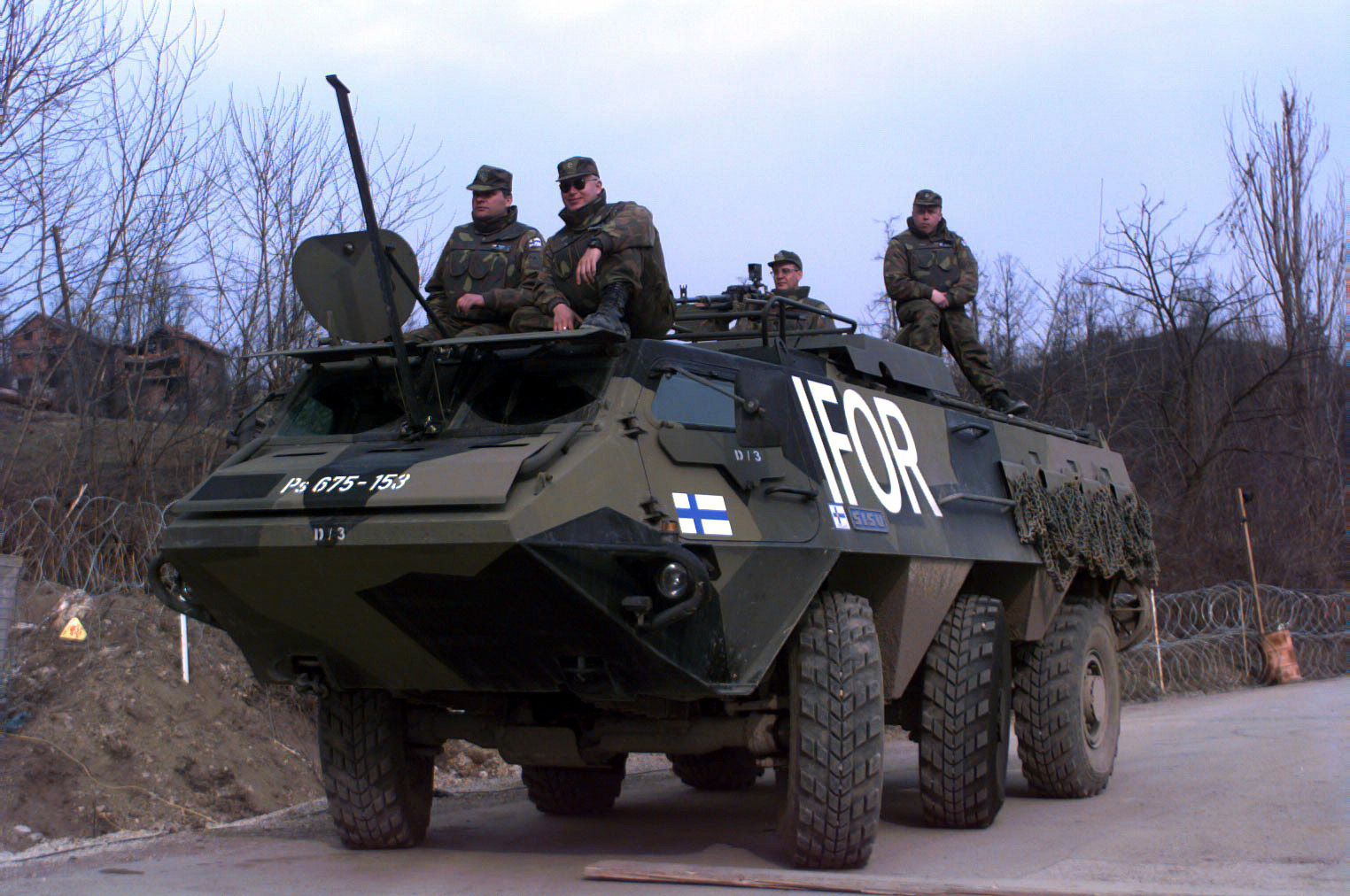
Finnish peacekeepers with a Sisu XA-180 in Bosnia.

UNMIBH was headed by a Special Representative of the Secretary-General (SRSG) appointed by UN Secretary-General Kofi Annan. The SRSG exercised authority over the UN’s IPTF Police Commissioner and coordinated other United Nations activities in Bosnia and Herzegovina. The main components of UNMIBH were: IPTF (International Police Task Force); the Criminal Justice Advisory Unit; a Civil Affairs Unit; and a Human Rights Office. The Mission had a nation-wide presence with regional headquarters in Banja Luka, Bihac, Doboj, Mostar, Sarajevo, Tuzla and a district headquarters in Brcko.

From 2001 through 2003, at the request of United Nations Secretary General Kofi Annan, Jacques Paul Klein served as his Special Representative and Coordinator of the United Nations Mission in Bosnia and Herzegovina, with the rank of Under-Secretary-General. As Chief of Mission, he had overall management authority and day-to-day management responsibility of 2,700 international police officers from 48 different countries with a budget of $168.2 million. UNMIBH restructured and downsized a 44,000 pre-war police force to approximately 16,000 trained personnel. The Mission recruited and trained the first BiH police contingent that was deployed to the United Nations Mission in East Timor and the first group of Bosnian United Nations military observers. He focused on combating international terrorism, illegal migration and organized crime and within eighteen months was able to cut the number of illegal persons entering BiH, through its three airports, from 25,000 to 300 per year.

In 2003 Officer Kathryn Bolkovac discovered a ring of human trafficking involving UN officers, after two young girls appeared after being sold and abused in illegal brothels. Dozens of girls raised 'eerily similar' accounts of abuse: including emigrating to take a job as a waitress or in domestic service, including at the insistence of their own families – but were diverted into human trafficking. They were trafficked to different locations, forcibly stripped and sold to individuals who beat and raped them in brothels in Bosnia.

Bolkovac stated accusations that mission head Klein dismissed several high-profile cases that were escalated to his level after she forwarded a number to the internal affairs unit. Bolkovac's story was adapted into the film "The Whistleblower". A UN audit, released by the US government in 2008, into Klein's actions in both Bosnia and Liberia accused him of a significant role in a number of scandals, though specifically clearing him of corruption. In 2010, a UN review into the audit stated the investigation was inadequate and allegations lacked merit, including a complete failure to notify Klein of the allegations and allow him a chance to respond to them.
