= United Nations Security Council Resolution 581 =

UN Security Council Resolution 581
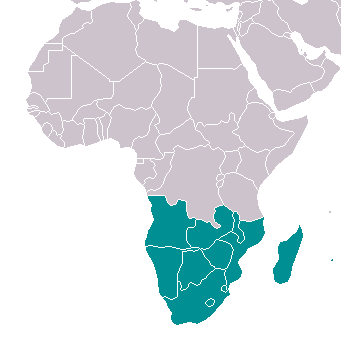
- Southern Africa
- Date: 13 February 1986
- Meeting no.: 2,662
- Code: S/RES/581 (Document)
- Subject: South Africa
- Voting summary: 13 voted for; None voted against; 2 abstained
- Result: Adopted

Security Council composition
- Permanent members: China; France; Soviet Union; United Kingdom; United States
- Non-permanent members: Australia; Bulgaria; Congo; Denmark; Ghana; Madagascar; Thailand; Trinidad and Tobago; United Arab Emirates; Venezuela

United Nations Security Council resolution 581, adopted on 13 February 1986, after hearing representations from Sudan and the front-line states and reaffirming resolutions 567 (1985), 568 (1985), 571 (1985), 572 (1985) and 580 (1985), the Council strongly condemned "racist South Africa" for its recent threats to perpetrate acts of aggression against neighbouring countries in southern Africa.

The Council deplored the violence in the region, warning South Africa against committing any further acts of aggression, as well as condemning other Member States' assistance to South Africa that could be used to destabilise other countries. It also called on other states to pressure South Africa to make it desist from further such acts.

As with other previous resolutions, Resolution 581 demanded South Africa eradicate apartheid, including the dismantling of the bantustans, removing bans and restrictions on anti-apartheid demonstrations, organisations, individuals and news media, allowing the return of exiles, and ending the violence against and repression of the black people and other opponents of apartheid. It also called for all political prisoners to be released.

Finally, Resolution 581 condemned South Africa for its disregard of United Nations resolutions on the topic, commended the front-line states for providing sanctuary to refugees and requested the Secretary-General to continue to monitor the situation.

The resolution was adopted by 13 votes to none against, with two abstentions from the United Kingdom and United States.

== See also ==
- List of United Nations Security Council Resolutions 501 to 600 (1982–1987)
- South African Border War
- Apartheid
