= United Nations Security Council Resolution 535 =

UN Security Council Resolution 535
- Lesotho within South Africa
- Date: 29 June 1983
- Meeting no.: 2,455
- Code: S/RES/535 (Document)
- Subject: South Africa
- Voting summary: 15 voted for; None voted against; None abstained
- Result: Adopted

Security Council composition
- Permanent members: China; France; Soviet Union; United Kingdom; United States
- Non-permanent members: Guyana; Jordan; Malta; Netherlands; Nicaragua; Pakistan; Poland; Togo; Zaire; Zimbabwe

United Nations Security Council Resolution 535, adopted unanimously on June 29, 1983, after examining the report of the Mission to Lesotho commissioned in Resolution 527 (1982), the Council reaffirmed its opposition to apartheid, commending Lesotho for providing sanctuary to refugees from South Africa.

The Council urged Member States and international organisations to provide assistance to Lesotho, requesting the Secretary-General to keep the Council regularly informed on the situation in the region.

== See also ==
- List of United Nations Security Council Resolutions 501 to 600 (1982–1987)
- South African Border War
- South Africa under apartheid
