= United Nations Security Council Resolution 560 =

UN Security Council Resolution 560
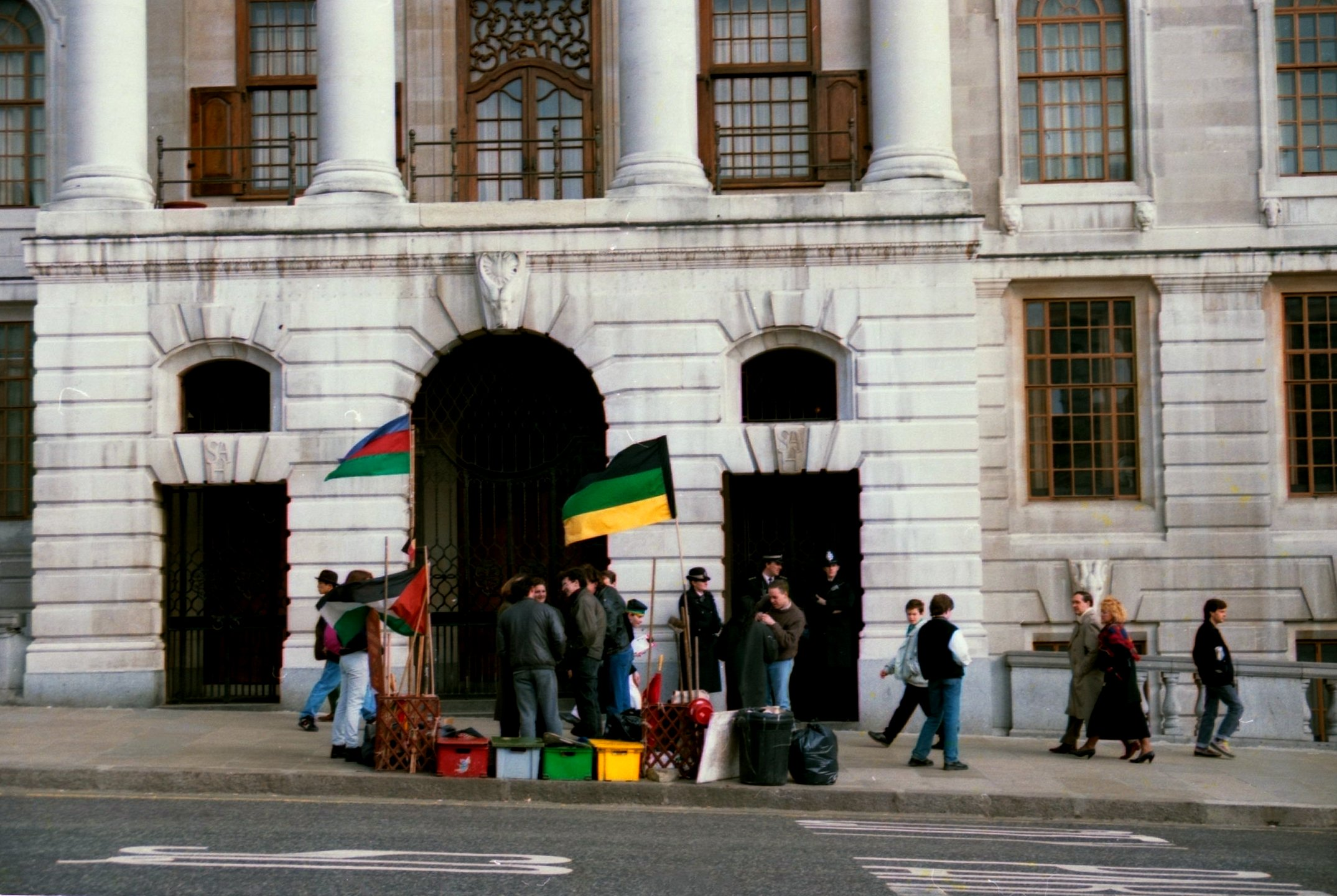
- Anti-apartheid protest at South Africa House, London (1989)
- Date: 12 March 1985
- Meeting no.: 2,574
- Code: S/RES/560 (Document)
- Subject: South Africa
- Voting summary: 15 voted for; None voted against; None abstained
- Result: Adopted

Security Council composition
- Permanent members: China; France; Soviet Union; United Kingdom; United States
- Non-permanent members: Australia; Burkina Faso; Denmark; Egypt; India; Madagascar; Peru; Thailand; Trinidad and Tobago; Ukrainian SSR

United Nations Security Council resolution 560, adopted unanimously on 12 March 1985, after recalling resolutions 473 (1980), 554 (1984) and 556 (1984), the council condemned the continuing repression of anti-apartheid activities in South Africa, noting that the repression would undermine the possibility of a peaceful solution.

The council also expressed its deep concern at charges of high treason on officials from the United Democratic Front and other organisations against apartheid, forced removals from Crossroads and killing of demonstrators. It also noted the denationalisation and dispossession of over 3.5 million indigenous African people and conflict arising from the bantustan policy.

The resolution called upon the "Pretoria regime" to release all political prisoners, including Nelson Mandela, urged the withdrawal of treason charges, and commended the "massive united resistance" of the people of South Africa.

== See also ==
- Internal resistance to South African apartheid
- List of United Nations Security Council Resolutions 501 to 600 (1982–1987)
- South Africa under apartheid
