= United Nations Security Council Resolution 587 =

UN Security Council Resolution 587
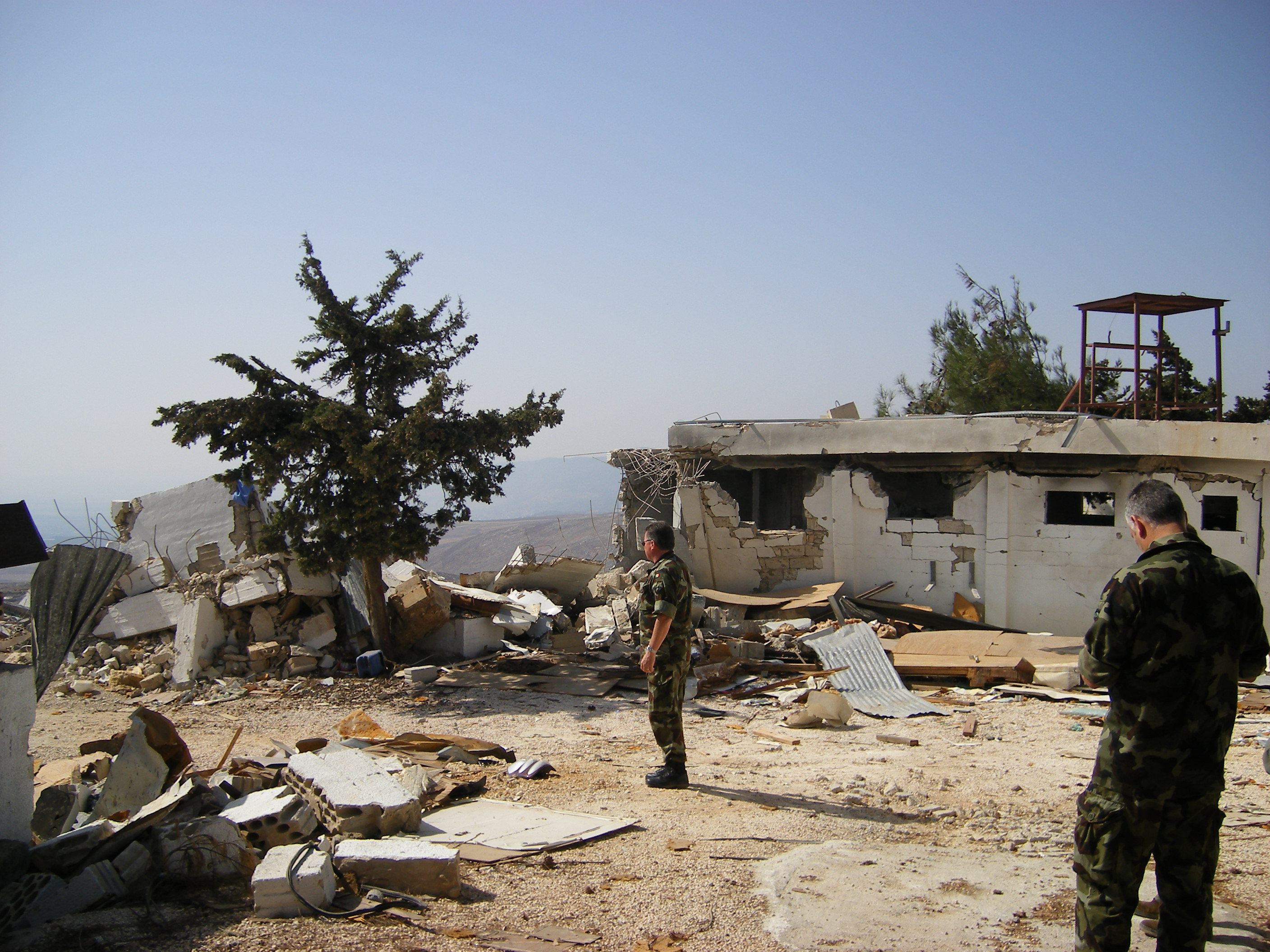
- Destroyed UN base in Lebanon
- Date: 23 September 1986
- Meeting no.: 2,708
- Code: S/RES/587 (Document)
- Subject: Israel–Lebanon
- Voting summary: 14 voted for; None voted against; 1 abstained
- Result: Adopted

Security Council composition
- Permanent members: China; France; Soviet Union; United Kingdom; United States
- Non-permanent members: Australia; Bulgaria; Congo; Denmark; Ghana; Madagascar; Thailand; Trinidad and Tobago; United Arab Emirates; Venezuela

United Nations Security Council resolution 587, adopted on 23 September 1986, after recalling previous resolutions on the topic, the council strongly condemned attacks on the United Nations Interim Force in Lebanon (UNIFIL) in southern Lebanon, expressing indignation at support the attacks receive. Several people died in the attack, in which UNIFIL blamed the Israeli-backed South Lebanon Army for perpetrating.

The resolution, tabled by France, commended the work of UNIFIL and its "courage, spirit of discipline and composure". It also took note of a report by the Secretary-General and accepted his proposals relating to the security of the Force, requesting him to report back within 21 days on the implementation of Resolution 587.

The Council ended by demanding the withdrawal of all military forces not accepted by the Lebanese authorities from southern Lebanon.

Resolution 587 was adopted with 14 votes to none, while the United States abstained from voting.

== See also ==
- Israeli–Lebanese conflict
- Lebanese Civil War
- List of United Nations Security Council Resolutions 501 to 600 (1982–1987)
- South Lebanon conflict (1982–2000)
