= United Nations Security Council Resolution 534 =

UN Security Council Resolution 534
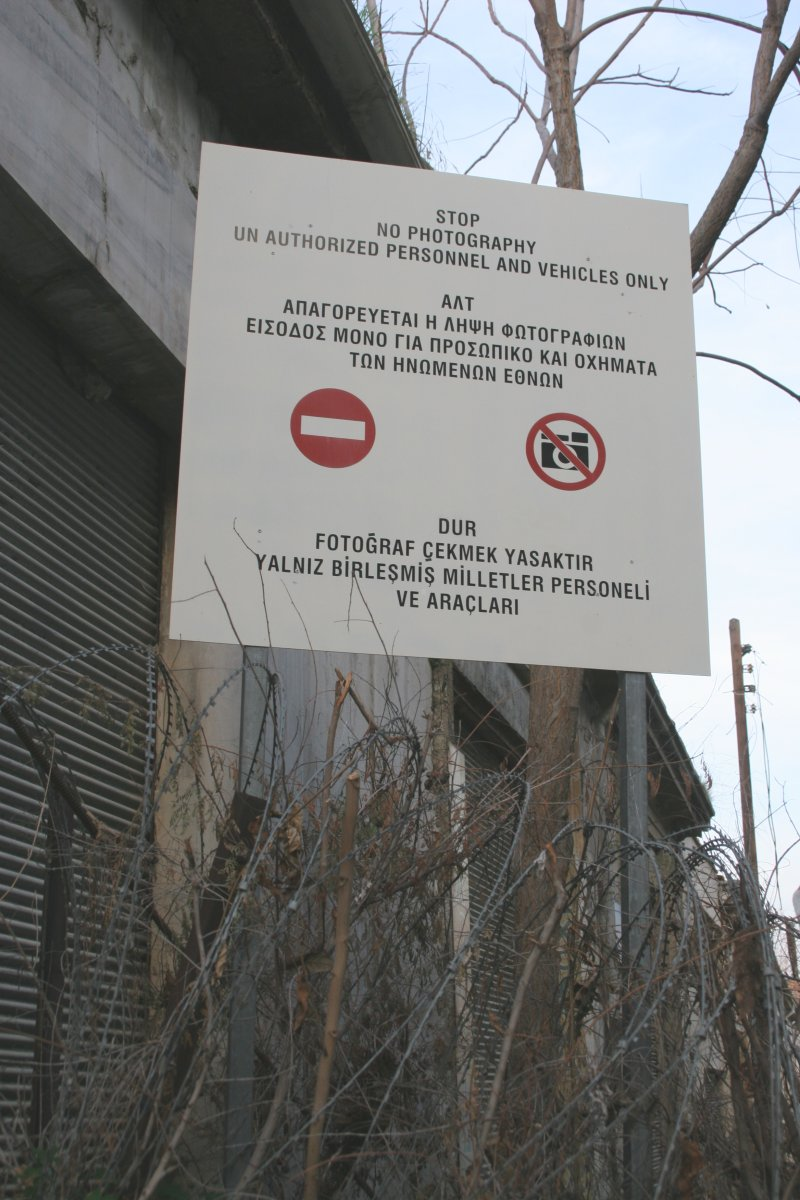
- UNFICYP buffer zone (2005)
- Date: 15 June 1983
- Meeting no.: 2,453
- Code: S/RES/534 (Document)
- Subject: Cyprus
- Voting summary: 15 voted for; None voted against; None abstained
- Result: Adopted

Security Council composition
- Permanent members: China; France; Soviet Union; United Kingdom; United States
- Non-permanent members: Guyana; Jordan; Malta; Netherlands; Nicaragua; Pakistan; Poland; Togo; Zaire; Zimbabwe

United Nations Security Council resolution 534, adopted unanimously on 15 June 1983, noted a report of the secretary-general that, due to the existing circumstances, the presence of the United Nations Peacekeeping Force in Cyprus (UNFICYP) would continue to be essential for a peaceful settlement. The council expressed its desire for all parties to support the ten-point agreement for the resumption of intercommunal talks, and asked the Secretary-General to report back again before 30 November 1983, to follow the implementation of the resolution.

The council reaffirmed its previous resolutions, including Resolution 365 (1974), expressed its concern over the situation, urged the involved parties to work together toward peace and once more extended the stationing of the Force in Cyprus, established in Resolution 186 (1964), until 15 December 1983.

== See also ==
- Cyprus dispute
- List of United Nations Security Council Resolutions 501 to 600 (1982–1987)
- United Nations Buffer Zone in Cyprus
- Turkish invasion of Cyprus
