= United Nations Security Council Resolution 599 =

UN Security Council Resolution 599
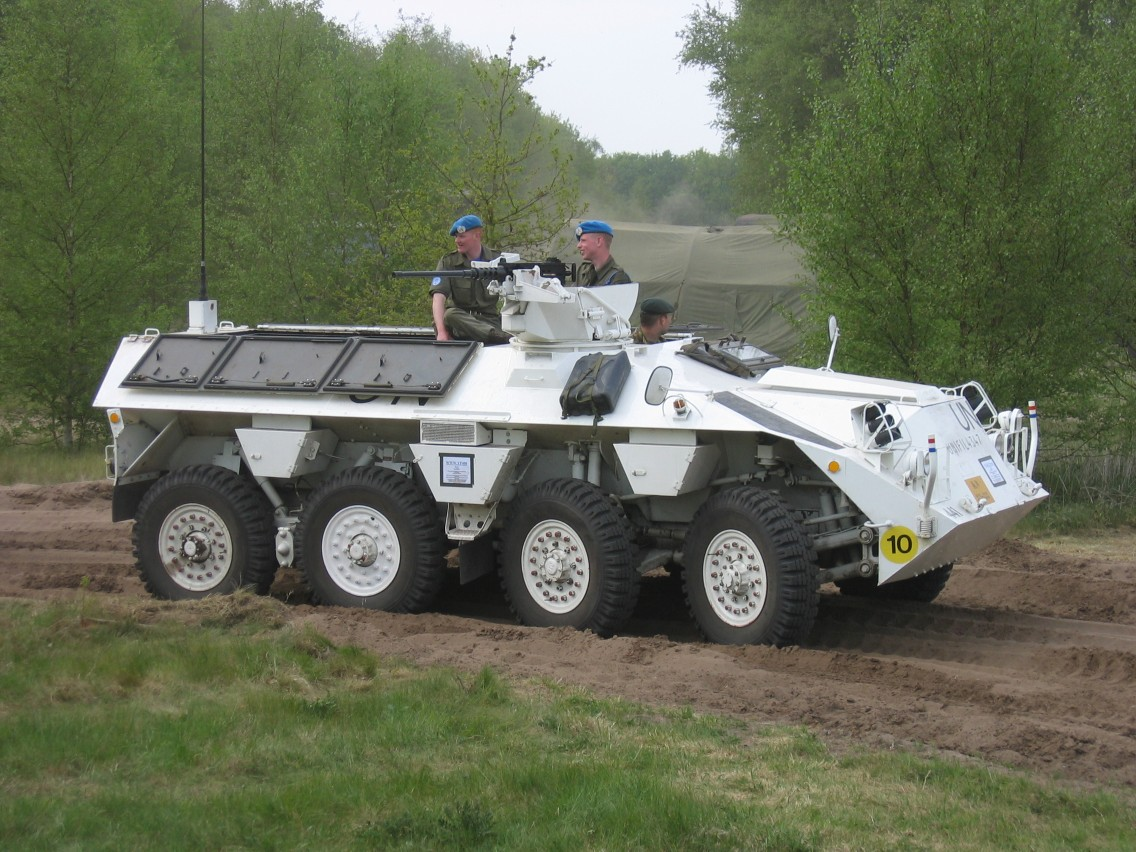
- UNIFIL forces
- Date: 31 July 1987
- Meeting no.: 2,751
- Code: S/RES/599 (Document)
- Subject: Israel–Lebanon
- Voting summary: 15 voted for; None voted against; None abstained
- Result: Adopted

Security Council composition
- Permanent members: China; France; Soviet Union; United Kingdom; United States
- Non-permanent members: Argentina; Bulgaria; Congo; Ghana; Italy; Japan; United Arab Emirates; Venezuela; West Germany; Zambia

United Nations Security Council resolution 599, adopted unanimously on 31 July 1987, after recalling previous resolutions on the topic, as well as studying the report by the Secretary-General on the United Nations Interim Force in Lebanon (UNIFIL) approved in 426 (1978), the Council decided to extend the mandate of UNIFIL for a further six months until 31 January 1988.

The Council then reemphasised the mandate of the Force and requested the Secretary-General to report back on the progress made with regard to the implementation of resolutions 425 (1978) and 426 (1978).

== See also ==
- Israeli–Lebanese conflict
- Lebanese Civil War
- List of United Nations Security Council Resolutions 501 to 600 (1982–1987)
- South Lebanon conflict (1985–2000)
