= United Nations Security Council Resolution 542 =

UN Security Council Resolution 542
- Lebanon
- Date: 23 November 1983
- Meeting no.: 2,501
- Code: S/RES/542 (Document)
- Subject: Lebanon
- Voting summary: 15 voted for; None voted against; None abstained
- Result: Adopted

Security Council composition
- Permanent members: China; France; Soviet Union; United Kingdom; United States
- Non-permanent members: Guyana; Jordan; Malta; Netherlands; Nicaragua; Pakistan; Poland; Togo; Zaire; Zimbabwe

United Nations Security Council resolution 542, adopted unanimously on 23 November 1983, after considering the situation in northern Lebanon, the Council expressed its concern at the fighting in the north of the country, deploring all loss of life.

The Council demanded a ceasefire from all parties concerned, and paid tribute to various humanitarian organisations for their efforts. It also requested the Secretary-General to continue to monitor the situation.

== See also ==
- Lebanese Civil War
- List of United Nations Security Council Resolutions 501 to 600 (1982–1987)
