= United Nations Security Council Resolution 592 =

United Nations Security Council resolution

UN Security Council Resolution 592
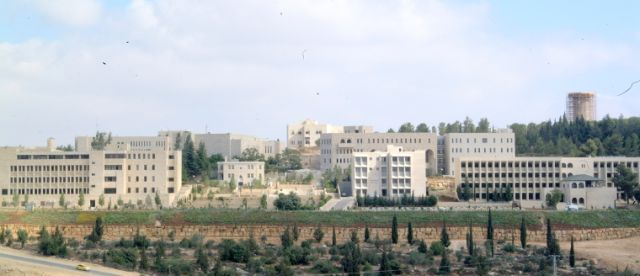
- Birzeit University
- Date: 8 December 1986
- Meeting no.: 2,727
- Code: S/RES/592 (Document)
- Subject: Territories occupied by Israel
- Voting summary: 14 voted for; None voted against; 1 abstained
- Result: Adopted

Security Council composition
- Permanent members: China; France; Soviet Union; United Kingdom; United States
- Non-permanent members: Australia; Bulgaria; Congo; Denmark; Ghana; Madagascar; Thailand; Trinidad and Tobago; United Arab Emirates; Venezuela

United Nations Security Council resolution 592, adopted on 8 December 1986, having considered a letter from the representative of Zimbabwe in his capacity as Chairman of the Movement of Non-Aligned Countries, the Council reaffirmed the Geneva Conventions and condemned the opening of fire at a student demonstration by the Israel Defense Forces, in which two students were killed at Birzeit University.

The Council called on Israel to abide by the Geneva Conventions, release any demonstrators detained at Birzeit University and called on all parties to exercise maximum restraint in the situation. It also requested the Secretary-General to submit a report on the implementation of the current resolution than 20 December 1986. The report later described the Israeli position as acting with "proportionate force" to contain the disturbance, which had originated from elements of the Palestine Liberation Organisation. Israel also said the rules of the Geneva Convention did not legally apply to the territory although it would implement humanitarian elements of the resolution.

The resolution was adopted by 14 votes in favour to none against, with one abstention from the United States.

== See also ==
- Arab–Israeli conflict
- Israeli–Palestinian conflict
- List of United Nations Security Council Resolutions 501 to 600 (1982–1987)
