= United Nations Security Council Resolution 575 =

UN Security Council Resolution 575
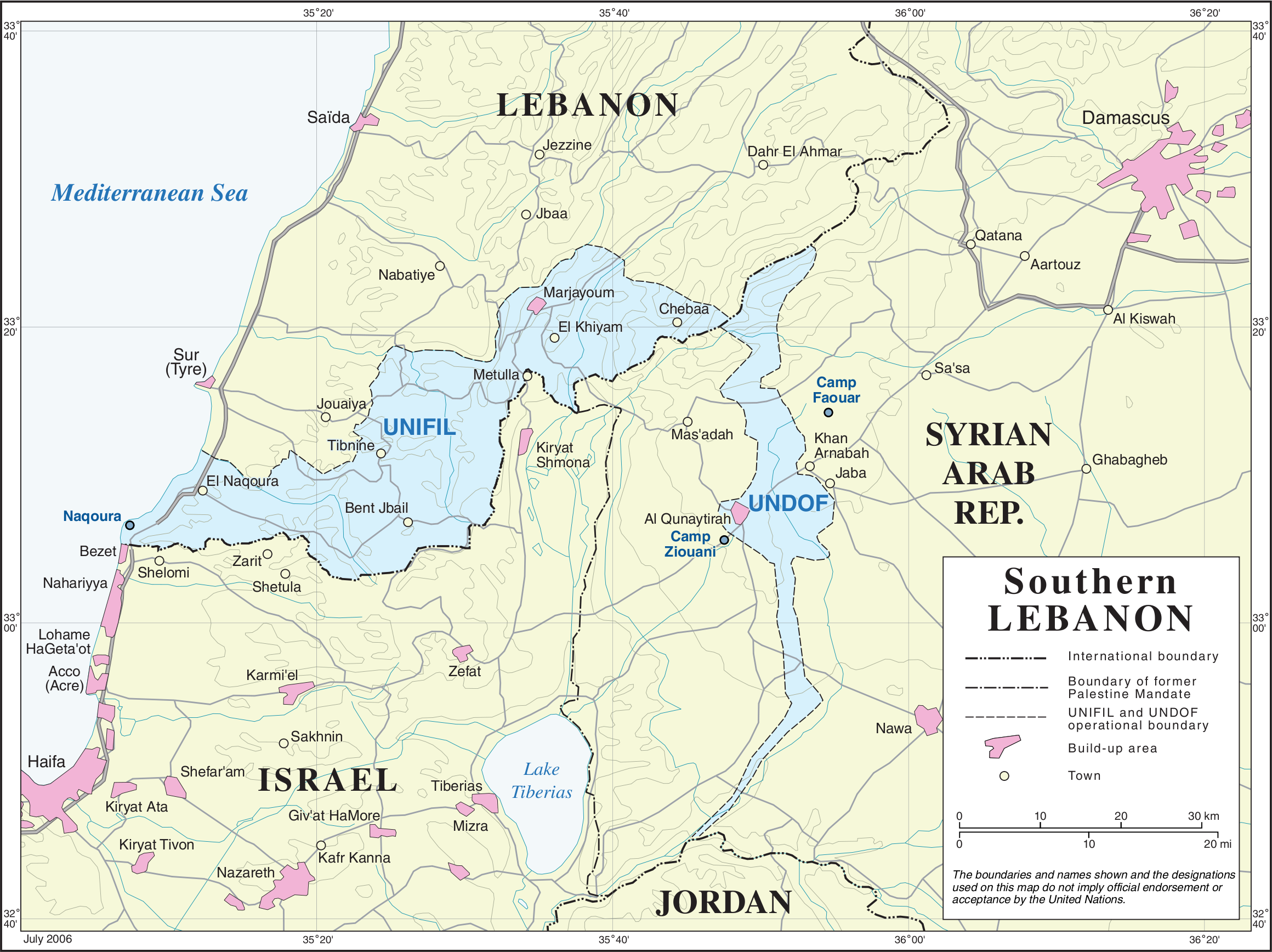
- UNIFIL zone, alongside UNDOF
- Date: 17 October 1985
- Meeting no.: 2,623
- Code: S/RES/575 (Document)
- Subject: Israel–Lebanon
- Voting summary: 13 voted for; None voted against; 2 abstained
- Result: Adopted

Security Council composition
- Permanent members: China; France; Soviet Union; United Kingdom; United States
- Non-permanent members: Australia; Burkina Faso; Denmark; Egypt; India; Madagascar; Peru; Thailand; Trinidad and Tobago; Ukrainian SSR

United Nations Security Council resolution 575, adopted on 17 October 1985, after recalling previous resolutions on the topic, as well as studying the report by the secretary-general on the United Nations Interim Force in Lebanon (UNIFIL) approved in 426 (1978), thec council decided to extend the mandate of UNIFIL for a further six months until 19 April 1986.

The council then reemphasised the mandate of the force and requested the secretary-general to report back on the progress made with regard to the implementation of resolutions 425 (1978) and 426 (1978).

The resolution was adopted by 13 votes to none, with two abstentions from the Ukrainian Soviet Socialist Republic and Soviet Union.

== See also ==
- Blue Line
- Israeli–Lebanese conflict
- Lebanese Civil War
- List of United Nations Security Council Resolutions 501 to 600 (1982–1987)
- South Lebanon conflict (1982–2000)
