= United Nations Security Council Resolution 528 =

UN Security Council Resolution 528
- Arabic
- Date: 21 December 1982
- Meeting no.: 2,410
- Code: S/RES/528 (Document)
- Subject: Working languages of the Security-Council
- Result: Adopted

Security Council composition
- Permanent members: China; France; Soviet Union; United Kingdom; United States
- Non-permanent members: Guyana; Ireland; Jordan; Japan; Panama; Poland; Spain; Togo; Uganda; Zaire

United Nations Security Council Resolution 528, adopted on December 21, 1982, after the General Assembly passed Resolution 3190 extolling the virtues of expanded working languages, the Council decided to include Arabic among the working languages of the Security Council.

No details of the voting were given, other than that it was adopted "by consensus".

== See also ==
- List of United Nations Security Council Resolutions 501 to 600 (1982–1987)
- United Nations Security Council Resolution 263
- United Nations Security Council Resolution 345
