= United Nations Security Council Resolution 595 =

UN Security Council Resolution 595
- International Court of Justice
- Date: 27 March 1987
- Meeting no.: 2,739
- Code: S/RES/595 (Document)
- Subject: International Court of Justice
- Voting summary: 15 voted for; None voted against; None abstained
- Result: Adopted

Security Council composition
- Permanent members: China; France; Soviet Union; United Kingdom; United States
- Non-permanent members: Argentina; Bulgaria; Congo; Ghana; Italy; Japan; United Arab Emirates; Venezuela; West Germany; Zambia

United Nations Security Council resolution 595, adopted unanimously on 27 March 1987, after noting the death of International Court of Justice (ICJ) judge and Vice President Guy Ladreit de Laucharrière on 10 March, the council decided that elections to the vacancy on the ICJ would take place on 14 September 1987 at the Security Council and at the General Assembly's 41st session.

Laucharrière was a French diplomat who had represented the country in the United Nations. In 1982, he was elected to the ICJ, and was elected its vice president in 1985. His term of office was due to expire in February 1988.

== See also ==
- Judges of the International Court of Justice
- List of United Nations Security Council Resolutions 501 to 600 (1982–1987)
