= United Nations Security Council Resolution 345 =

UN Security Council Resolution 345
- Chinese (Traditional and Simplified)
- Date: 17 January 1974
- Meeting no.: 1,761
- Code: S/RES/345 (Document)
- Subject: Chinese language in Security Council
- Result: Adopted

Security Council composition
- Permanent members: China; France; Soviet Union; United Kingdom; United States
- Non-permanent members: Australia; Austria; Byelorussian SSR; Cameroon; Costa Rica; Indonesia; Iraq; Kenya; Mauritania; Peru

United Nations Security Council Resolution 345, adopted on January 17, 1974, after a resolution from the General Assembly, the Council decided to expand the working languages of the Security Council to include Chinese. Along with Chinese, the other four working languages of the council were English, French, Russian and Spanish.

The resolution was adopted without vote.

== See also ==
- List of United Nations Security Council Resolutions 301 to 400 (1971–1976)
- United Nations Security Council Resolution 263
- United Nations Security Council Resolution 528
