= United Nations Security Council Resolution 536 =

UN Security Council Resolution 536
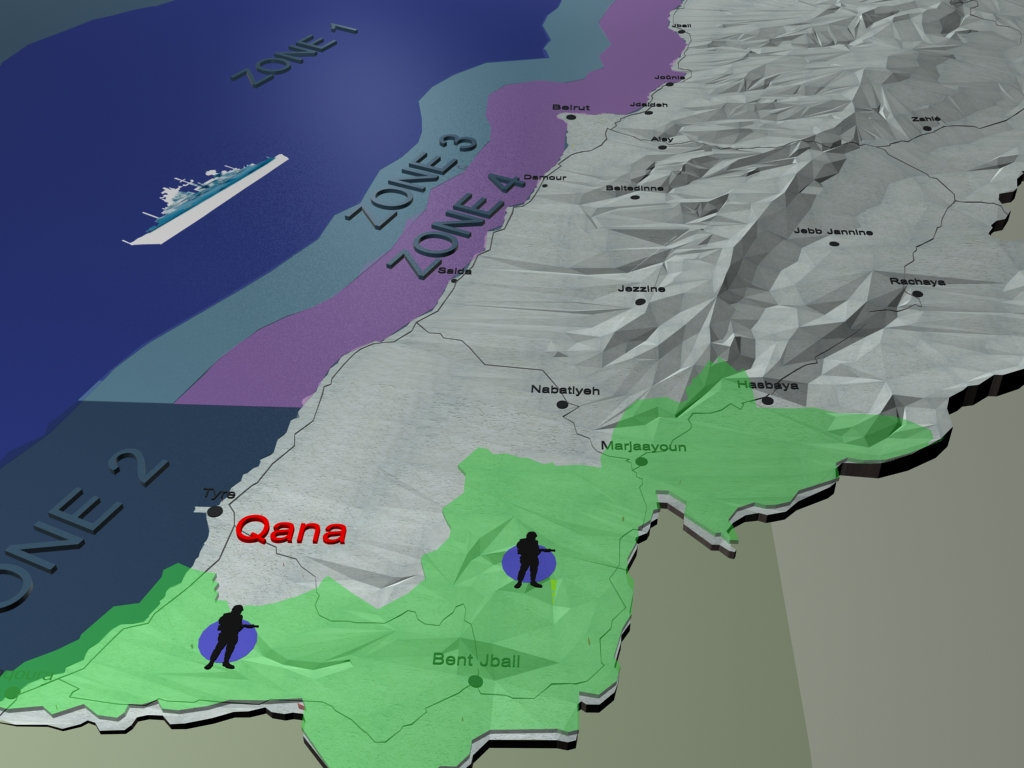
- UNIFIL zone
- Date: 18 July 1983
- Meeting no.: 2,456
- Code: S/RES/536 (Document)
- Subject: Israel–Lebanon
- Voting summary: 13 voted for; None voted against; 2 abstained
- Result: Adopted

Security Council composition
- Permanent members: China; France; Soviet Union; United Kingdom; United States
- Non-permanent members: Guyana; Jordan; Malta; Netherlands; Nicaragua; Pakistan; Poland; Togo; Zaire; Zimbabwe

United Nations Security Council resolution 536, adopted on 18 July 1983, after recalling resolutions 425 (1978), 426 (1978), 508 (1982), 509 (1982) and 520 (1982), as well as studying the report by the Secretary-General on the United Nations Interim Force in Lebanon (UNIFIL), the Council decided to extend the mandate of UNIFIL for a further three months until 19 October 1983.

The Council then requested the Secretary-General to report back on the progress made with regard to the implementation of the resolution.

Resolution 536 was adopted by 13 votes to none, with two abstentions from the People's Republic of Poland and Soviet Union.

== See also ==
- 1982 Lebanon War
- Israeli–Lebanese conflict
- Lebanese Civil War
- List of United Nations Security Council Resolutions 501 to 600 (1982–1987)
