= United Nations Security Council Resolution 549 =

UN Security Council Resolution 549
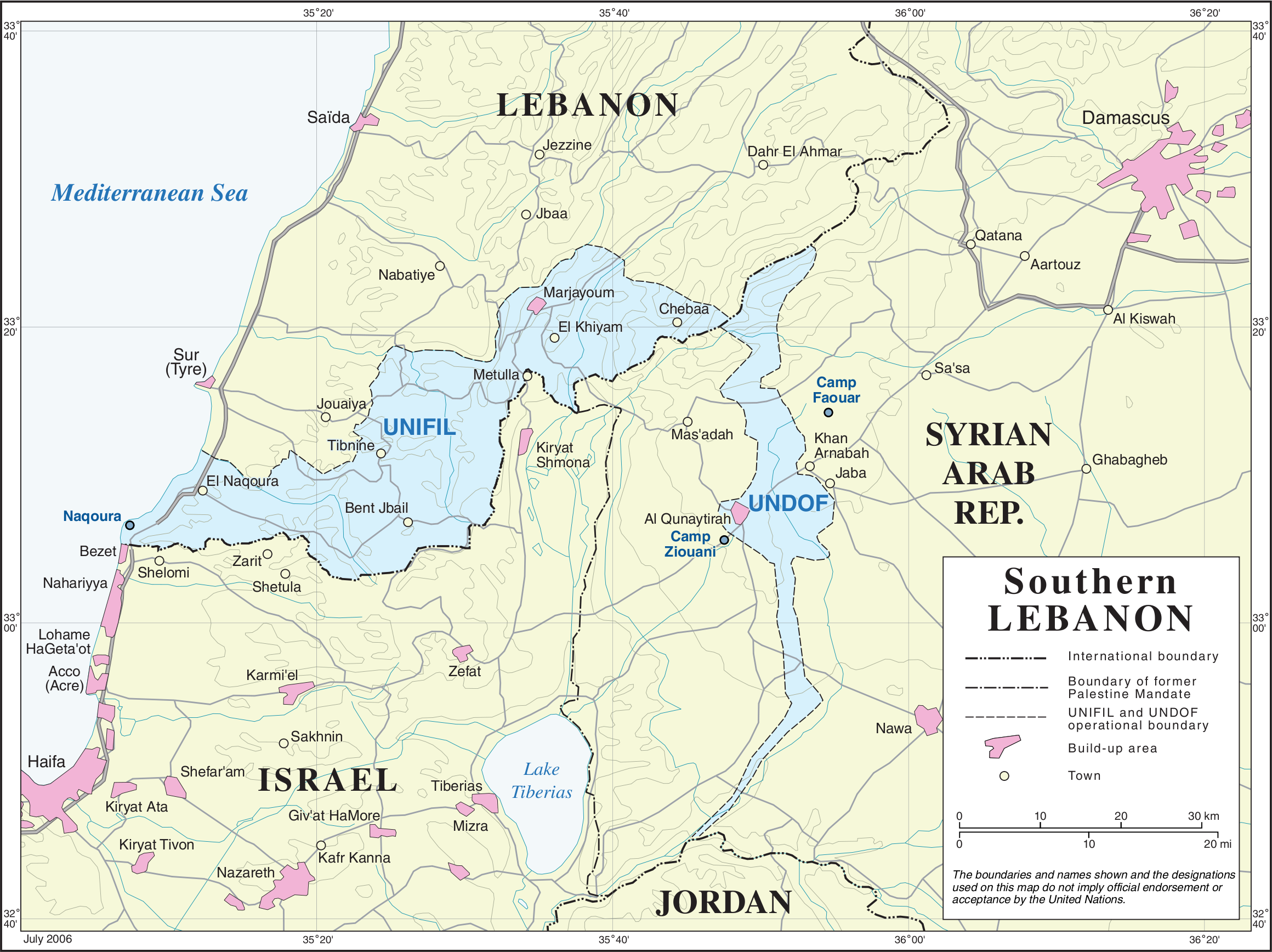
- UNIFIL zone, alongside UNDOF
- Date: 19 April 1984
- Meeting no.: 2,530
- Code: S/RES/549 (Document)
- Subject: Israel–Lebanon
- Voting summary: 13 voted for; None voted against; 2 abstained
- Result: Adopted

Security Council composition
- Permanent members: China; France; Soviet Union; United Kingdom; United States
- Non-permanent members: Egypt; India; Malta; Netherlands; Nicaragua; Pakistan; Peru; Ukrainian SSR; Upper Volta; Zimbabwe

United Nations Security Council resolution 549 extended the mandate of UNIFIL for six months until 19 October 1984.

== History ==
The resolution was adopted on 19 April 1984, after recalling previous resolutions on the topic, as well as studying the report by the Secretary-General on the United Nations Interim Force in Lebanon (UNIFIL) approved in 426 (1978).

The Council reemphasised the mandate of the Force and requested the Secretary-General to report back on the progress made with regard to the implementation of the resolution.

Resolution 549 was adopted by 13 votes to none, with two abstentions from the Ukrainian Soviet Socialist Republic and Soviet Union.

== See also ==
- 1982 Lebanon War
- Israeli–Lebanese conflict
- Lebanese Civil War
- List of United Nations Security Council Resolutions 501 to 600 (1982–1987)
- South Lebanon conflict (1985–2000)
