= United Nations Security Council Resolution 504 =

UN Security Council Resolution 504
- Chad
- Date: 30 April 1982
- Meeting no.: 2,358
- Code: S/RES/504 (Document)
- Subject: Chad
- Result: Adopted

Security Council composition
- Permanent members: China; France; Soviet Union; United Kingdom; United States
- Non-permanent members: Guyana; Ireland; Jordan; Japan; Panama; Poland; Spain; Togo; Uganda; Zaire

United Nations Security Council resolution 504, adopted on 30 April 1982, after receiving representations from the Organisation of African Unity (OAU) and Chad, noting the cooperation between the United Nations and OAU, the Council took note of the OAU's decision to establish a peacekeeping force in Chad due to the civil war there.

The resolution continued by requesting the Secretary-General to take necessary measures to support the mission, including funding.

Details of the vote were not given, other than that it was adopted "by consensus".

== See also ==
- List of United Nations Security Council Resolutions 501 to 600 (1982–1987)
- Transitional Government of National Unity
