= United Nations Security Council Resolution 548 =

UN Security Council Resolution 548
- Location of Brunei
- Date: 24 February 1984
- Meeting no.: 2,518
- Code: S/RES/548 (Document)
- Subject: Admission of new Members to the UN: Brunei Darussalam
- Voting summary: 15 voted for; None voted against; None abstained
- Result: Adopted

Security Council composition
- Permanent members: China; France; Soviet Union; United Kingdom; United States
- Non-permanent members: Egypt; India; Malta; Netherlands; Nicaragua; Pakistan; Peru; Ukrainian SSR; Upper Volta; Zimbabwe

United Nations Security Council resolution 548, adopted unanimously on 24 February 1984, after examining the application of Brunei Darussalam for membership in the United Nations, the Council recommended to the General Assembly that Brunei Darussalam be admitted.

== See also ==
- Member states of the United Nations
- List of United Nations Security Council Resolutions 501 to 600 (1982–1987)
