= List of United Nations Security Council Resolutions 501 to 600 =

This is a list of United Nations Security Council Resolutions 501 to 600 adopted between 25 February 1982 and 19 October 1987.

Resolution	Date	Vote	Concerns
501	25 February 1982	13–0–2 (abstentions: Poland, USSR)	Increases size of the United Nations Interim Force in Lebanon
502	3 April 1982	10–1–4 (against: Panama; abstentions: China, Poland, Spain, USSR)	Demands end to the Falklands War
503	9 April 1982	15–0–0	Death sentences of three African National Congress members in South Africa
504	30 April 1982	Adopted "by consensus"	Organisation of African Unity peacekeeping mission in Chad
505	26 May 1982	15–0–0	Negotiations in the aftermath of the Falklands War
506	26 May 1982	15–0–0	Extends mandate of the United Nations Disengagement Observer Force
507	28 May 1982	15–0–0	Report on failed foreign mercenary coup in the Seychelles
508	5 June 1982	15–0–0	Demands an end to hostilities in the 1982 Lebanon War
509	6 June 1982	15–0–0	Israeli invasion of Lebanon
510	15 June 1982	15–0–0	Extends mandate of the United Nations Peacekeeping Force in Cyprus
511	18 June 1982	13–0–2 (abstentions: Poland, USSR)	Extends mandate of the United Nations Interim Force in Lebanon
512	19 June 1982	15–0–0	Humanitarian situation in Lebanon
513	4 July 1982	15–0–0	Humanitarian situation in Lebanon
514	12 July 1982	15–0–0	Calls for end of hostilities in the Iran–Iraq War
515	29 July 1982	14–0–0 (United States did not participate in voting)	Blockade of Beirut by Israel
516	1 August 1982	15–0–0	Violations of ceasefire in Beirut
517	4 August 1982	14–0–1 (abstention: US)	Calls for Israel to return its troops to previous positions
518	12 August 1982	15–0–0	Demands Israel and other parties strictly observe Security Council resolutions
519	17 August 1982	13–0–2 (abstentions: Poland, USSR)	Extends mandate of the United Nations Interim Force in Lebanon
520	17 September 1982	15–0–0	Assassination of Lebanese President-elect Bachir Gemayel
521	19 September 1982	15–0–0	Massacre of Palestinians in Beirut by the Lebanese Forces militia
522	4 October 1982	15–0–0	Calls for ceasefire in war between Iraq and Iran
523	18 October 1982	13–0–2 (abstentions: Poland, USSR)	Extends mandate of the United Nations Interim Force in Lebanon
524	29 November 1982	15–0–0	Extends mandate of the United Nations Disengagement Observer Force
525	7 December 1982	15–0–0	Death sentences of three African National Congress members in South Africa
526	14 December 1982	15–0–0	Extends mandate of the United Nations Peacekeeping Force in Cyprus
527	15 December 1982	15–0–0	South African attack on Lesotho
528	21 December 1982	Adopted "by consensus"	Arabic language in the Security Council
529	18 January 1983	13–0–2 (abstentions: Poland, USSR)	Extends mandate of the United Nations Interim Force in Lebanon
530	19 May 1983	15–0–0	Tensions between Honduras and Nicaragua; Contadora Group efforts
531	26 May 1983	15–0–0	Extends mandate of the United Nations Disengagement Observer Force
532	31 May 1983	15–0–0	Condemns continued South African occupation of Namibia
533	7 June 1983	15–0–0	Death sentences of African National Congress members in South Africa
534	15 June 1983	15–0–0	Extends mandate of the United Nations Peacekeeping Force in Cyprus
535	29 June 1983	15–0–0	Endorses Mission to Lesotho report; assistance to Lesotho
536	18 July 1983	13–0–2 (abstentions: Poland, USSR)	Extends mandate of the United Nations Interim Force in Lebanon
537	22 September 1983	15–0–0	Admission of Saint Kitts and Nevis to the United Nations
538	18 October 1983	13–0–2 (abstentions: Poland, USSR)	Extends mandate of the United Nations Interim Force in Lebanon
539	28 October 1983	14–0–1 (abstention: US)	Condemns continued South African occupation of Namibia
540	31 October 1983	12–0–3 (abstentions: Malta, Nicaragua, Pakistan)	Condemns Iran–Iraq War
541	18 November 1983	13–1–1 (against: Pakistan; abstention: Jordan)	Declaration of Independence of the Turkish Republic of Northern Cyprus
542	23 November 1983	15–0–0	Lebanese Civil War
543	29 November 1983	15–0–0	Extends mandate of United Nations Disengagement Observer Force
544	15 December 1983	15–0–0	Extends mandate of the United Nations Peacekeeping Force in Cyprus
545	20 December 1983	14–0–1 (abstention: US)	South African occupation of southern Angola
546	6 January 1984	13–0–2 (abstentions: UK, US)	South African attacks on Angola
547	13 January 1984	15–0–0	Death sentence on Benjamin Maloise in South Africa
548	24 February 1984	15–0–0	Admission of Brunei Darussalam to the United Nations.
549	19 April 1984	13–0–2 (abstentions: Ukraine, USSR)	Extends mandate of the United Nations Interim Force in Lebanon
550	11 May 1984	13–1–1 (against: Pakistan; abstention: US)	Secessionist activities in Cyprus
551	30 May 1984	15–0–0	Extends mandate of the United Nations Disengagement Observer Force
552	1 June 1984	13–0–2 (abstentions: Nicaragua, Zimbabwe)	Iranian attacks on ships to and from the ports of Kuwait and Saudi Arabia
553	15 June 1984	15–0–0	Extends mandate of the United Nations Peacekeeping Force in Cyprus
554	17 August 1984	13–0–2 (abstentions: UK, US)	South African general election, 1984
555	12 October 1984	13–0–2 (abstentions: Ukraine, USSR)	Extends mandate of the United Nations Interim Force in Lebanon
556	23 October 1984	14–0–1 (abstention: US)	Massacres of those opposing apartheid in South Africa
557	28 November 1984	15–0–0	Extends mandate of the United Nations Disengagement Observer Force
558	13 December 1984	15–0–0	Arms production in South Africa despite arms embargo
559	14 December 1984	15–0–0	Extends mandate of the United Nations Peacekeeping Force in Cyprus
560	12 March 1985	15–0–0	Condemns repression in South Africa
561	17 April 1985	13–0–2 (abstentions: Ukraine, USSR)	Extends the mandate of the United Nations Interim Force in Lebanon
562	10 May 1985	Adopted paragraph by paragraph	Nicaragua – United States relations; Contadora Group efforts
563	21 May 1985	15–0–0	Extends mandate of the United Nations Disengagement Observer Force
564	31 May 1985	15–0–0	Humanitarian situation in Lebanon
565	14 June 1985	15–0–0	Extends mandate of the United Nations Peacekeeping Force in Cyprus
566	19 June 1985	13–0–2 (abstentions: UK, US)	Continued occupation of Namibia by South Africa
567	20 June 1985	15–0–0	South African attack on Angola
568	21 June 1985	15–0–0	South African attack on Botswana
569	26 July 1985	13–0–2 (abstentions: UK, US)	Condemns apartheid system and killings in South Africa
570	12 September 1985	15–0–0	Vacancy at the International Court of Justice
571	20 September 1985	15–0–0	South African attack on Angola
572	30 September 1985	15–0–0	South African attack on Botswana
573	4 October 1985	14–0–1 (abstention: US)	Israeli attack on Tunisia
574	7 October 1985	15–0–0 (separate vote on paragraph 6)	South African attack on Angola
575	17 October 1985	13–0–2 (abstentions: Ukraine, USSR)	Extends mandate of the United Nations Interim Force in Lebanon
576	21 November 1985	15–0–0	Extends mandate of the United Nations Disengagement Observer Force
577	6 December 1985	15–0–0 (separate vote on paragraph 6)	South African attack on Angola
578	12 December 1985	15–0–0	Extends mandate of the United Nations Peacekeeping Force in Cyprus
579	18 December 1985	15–0–0	Increased incidents of hostage-taking
580	30 December 1985	15–0–0	South African attack on Lesotho
581	13 February 1986	13–0–2 (abstentions: UK, US)	Condemns South African attacks on other countries in southern Africa
582	24 February 1986	15–0–0	Condemns continued military action in the Iran–Iraq War
583	18 April 1986	15–0–0	Extends mandate of the United Nations Interim Force in Lebanon
584	29 May 1986	15–0–0	Extends mandate of the United Nations Disengagement Observer Force
585	13 June 1986	15–0–0	Extends mandate of the United Nations Peacekeeping Force in Cyprus
586	18 July 1986	15–0–0	Extends mandate of the United Nations Interim Force in Lebanon
587	23 September 1986	14–0–1 (abstention: US)	Condemns attacks on the United Nations Interim Force in Lebanon
588	8 October 1986	15–0–0	Calls for end of war between Iran and Iraq
589	10 October 1986	15–0–0	Recommends Javier Pérez de Cuéllar as Secretary-General for second term
590	26 November 1986	15–0–0	Extends mandate of the United Nations Disengagement Observer Force
591	28 November 1986	Adopted "by consensus"	Strengthens arms embargo against South Africa
592	8 December 1986	14–0–1 (abstention: US)	Condemns killing of students by Israel in the Palestinian territories
593	11 December 1986	15–0–0	Extends mandate of the United Nations Peacekeeping Force in Cyprus
594	15 January 1987	15–0–0	Extends mandate of the United Nations Interim Force in Lebanon
595	27 March 1987	15–0–0	Vacancy at the International Court of Justice
596	29 May 1987	15–0–0	Extends mandate of the United Nations Disengagement Observer Force
597	12 June 1987	15–0–0	Extends mandate of the United Nations Peacekeeping Force in Cyprus
598	20 July 1987	15–0–0	Demands a ceasefire and protection for civilians during the Iran–Iraq War
599	31 July 1987	15–0–0	Extends mandate of the United Nations Interim Force in Lebanon
600	19 October 1987	15–0–0	The Republic of Nauru and the International Court of Justice

== See also ==
- Lists of United Nations Security Council resolutions
- List of United Nations Security Council Resolutions 401 to 500
- List of United Nations Security Council Resolutions 601 to 700
