= United Nations Security Council Resolution 580 =

UN Security Council Resolution 580
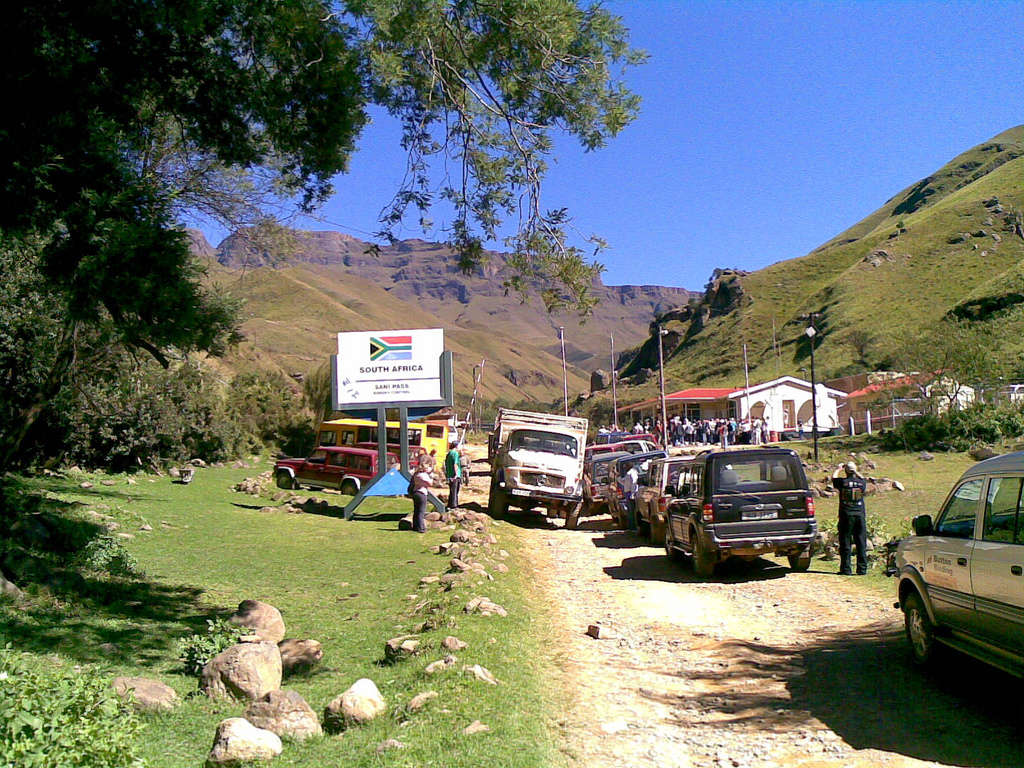
- Lesotho–South Africa border
- Date: 30 December 1985
- Meeting no.: 2,639
- Code: S/RES/580 (Document)
- Subject: Lesotho–South Africa
- Voting summary: 15 voted for; None voted against; None abstained
- Result: Adopted

Security Council composition
- Permanent members: China; France; Soviet Union; United Kingdom; United States
- Non-permanent members: Australia; Burkina Faso; Denmark; Egypt; India; Madagascar; Peru; Thailand; Trinidad and Tobago; Ukrainian SSR

United Nations Security Council resolution 580, adopted unanimously on 30 December 1985, having heard representations from Lesotho and recalling Resolution 527 (1982), the Council condemned the recent attacks on the Kingdom of Lesotho by South Africa, resulting in loss of life and damage to property on 19 December, in which several South African refugees were murdered in Lesotho's capital Maseru by the South African Defence Force.

The Council demanded South Africa pay compensation to Lesotho, calling upon all parties concerned to normalise their relations and to apply established channels of communication on matters of mutual concern in a peaceful manner. It reminded South Africa to live up to its commitments not to destabilise neighbouring countries, and to begin the process of dismantling apartheid.

The resolution then requested Member States and international organisations provide economic assistance to Lesotho due to the damage caused by the attacks.

Lastly, the resolution required the Secretary-General to establish a presence in Lesotho compromising of one or two civilians in Maseru for the purposes of keeping him informed on developments. It also asked him to report to the Security Council as appropriate on developments in the region.

== See also ==
- List of United Nations Security Council Resolutions 501 to 600 (1982–1987)
- South African Border War
- South Africa under apartheid
