= United Nations Security Council Resolution 537 =

United Nations Security Council resolution

UN Security Council Resolution 537
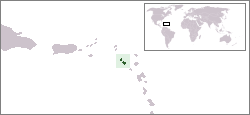
- Location of Saint Kitts and Nevis
- Date: 22 September 1983
- Meeting no.: 2,479
- Code: S/RES/537 (Document)
- Subject: Admission of new Members to the UN: Saint Kitts and Nevis
- Voting summary: 15 voted for; None voted against; None abstained
- Result: Adopted

Security Council composition
- Permanent members: China; France; Soviet Union; United Kingdom; United States
- Non-permanent members: Guyana; Jordan; Malta; Netherlands; Nicaragua; Pakistan; Poland; Togo; Zaire; Zimbabwe

United Nations Security Council resolution 537, adopted unanimously on 22 September 1983, after examining the application of Saint Kitts and Nevis for membership in the United Nations, the Council recommended to the General Assembly that Saint Kitts and Nevis be admitted.

== See also ==
- Member states of the United Nations
- List of United Nations Security Council Resolutions 501 to 600 (1982–1987)
