= United Nations Security Council Resolution 569 =

UN Security Council Resolution 569
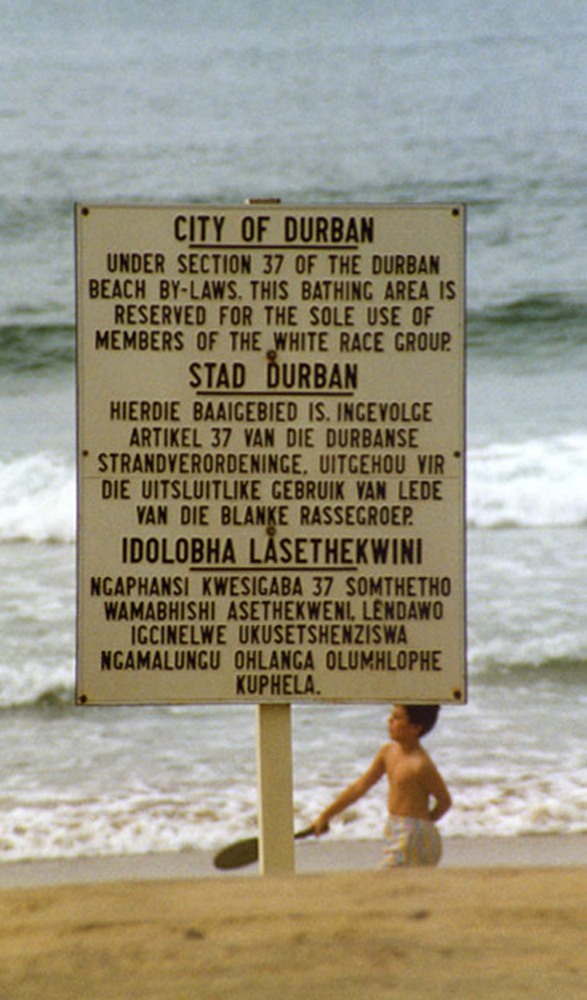
- Apartheid-era sign on a beach (1989)
- Date: 26 July 1985
- Meeting no.: 2,602
- Code: S/RES/569 (Document)
- Subject: South Africa
- Voting summary: 13 voted for; None voted against; 2 abstained
- Result: Adopted

Security Council composition
- Permanent members: China; France; Soviet Union; United Kingdom; United States
- Non-permanent members: Australia; Burkina Faso; Denmark; Egypt; India; Madagascar; Peru; Thailand; Trinidad and Tobago; Ukrainian SSR

United Nations Security Council resolution 568, adopted on 26 July 1985, after expressing its outrage and concern at the suffering caused by the apartheid system in South Africa, further condemned the repressive policies of the apartheid system including murders and forced removals, as well as the state of emergency imposed in 36 districts in the country, demanding it be lifted immediately.

The Council went on to call for the release of all political prisoners in the country, including Nelson Mandela, and that the establishment of a free, democratic society can lead to a solution. It also urged Member States to, in addition to the compulsory arms embargo, participate in restrictions on investments, maritime and aerial relations, sport and cultural relations, and probitation of the sale of krugerrands, commending Member States that had already adopted such procedures.

Finally, Resolution 569 requested the Secretary-General to issue a report on the implementation of the current resolution.

The resolution was adopted by 13 votes to none, with abstentions from the United Kingdom and United States.

== See also ==
- Internal resistance to South African apartheid
- List of United Nations Security Council Resolutions 501 to 600 (1982–1987)
- Apartheid
