= United Nations Security Council Resolution 570 =

UN Security Council Resolution 570
- International Court of Justice
- Date: 12 September 1985
- Meeting no.: 2,604
- Code: S/RES/570 (Document)
- Subject: International Court of Justice
- Voting summary: 15 voted for; None voted against; None abstained
- Result: Adopted

Security Council composition
- Permanent members: China; France; Soviet Union; United Kingdom; United States
- Non-permanent members: Australia; Burkina Faso; Denmark; Egypt; India; Madagascar; Peru; Thailand; Trinidad and Tobago; Ukrainian SSR

United Nations Security Council Resolution 570, adopted unanimously on 12 September 1985, after noting the death of International Court of Justice (ICJ) Judge Platon D. Morozov, the Council decided that elections to the vacancy on the ICJ would take place on 9 December 1985 at the Security Council and at the General Assembly's 40th session.

Platon Morozov, born in Leningrad in 1906, was a lawyer who represented the Soviet Union in various international organisations. He was a member of the court since 6 February 1970, and was re-elected on 6 February 1979 for another term, due to end in 1988. However, in 1985 Morozov had to resign due to ill health, the second time a judge at the ICJ had done so.

== See also ==
- Judges of the International Court of Justice
- List of United Nations Security Council Resolutions 501 to 600 (1982–1987)
