= United Nations Security Council Resolution 524 =

UN Security Council Resolution 524
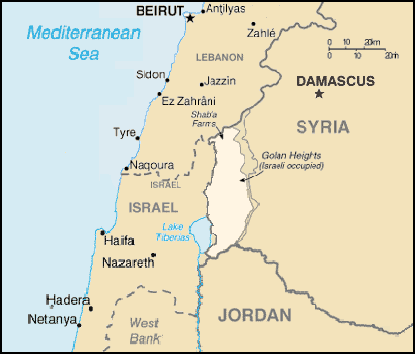
- Golan Heights
- Date: 29 November 1982
- Meeting no.: 2,403
- Code: S/RES/524 (Document)
- Subject: Israel–Syria
- Voting summary: 15 voted for; None voted against; None abstained
- Result: Adopted

Security Council composition
- Permanent members: China; France; Soviet Union; United Kingdom; United States
- Non-permanent members: Guyana; Ireland; Jordan; Japan; Panama; Poland; Spain; Togo; Uganda; Zaire

United Nations Security Council resolution 524, adopted unanimously on 29 November 1982, considered a report by the Secretary-General regarding the United Nations Disengagement Observer Force. The Council noted its efforts to establish a durable and just peace in the Middle East but also expressed its concern over the prevailing state of tension in the area.

The resolution decided to call upon the parties concerned to immediately implement Resolution 338 (1973), it renewed the mandate of the Observer Force for another six months until 31 May 1983 and requested that the Secretary-General submit a report on the situation at the end of that period.

== See also ==
- Arab–Israeli conflict
- Golan Heights
- Israel–Syria relations
- List of United Nations Security Council Resolutions 501 to 600 (1982–1987)
