= United Nations Security Council Resolution 564 =

UN Security Council Resolution 564
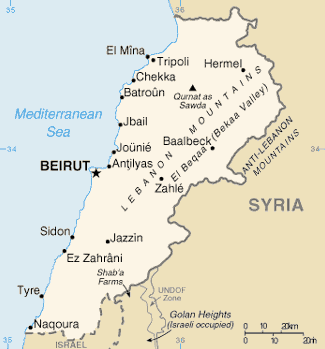
- Lebanon
- Date: 31 May 1985
- Meeting no.: 2,582
- Code: S/RES/564 (Document)
- Subject: Lebanon
- Voting summary: 15 voted for; None voted against; None abstained
- Result: Adopted

Security Council composition
- Permanent members: China; France; Soviet Union; United Kingdom; United States
- Non-permanent members: Australia; Burkina Faso; Denmark; Egypt; India; Madagascar; Peru; Thailand; Trinidad and Tobago; Ukrainian SSR

United Nations Security Council resolution 564, adopted unanimously on 31 May 1985, after noting the statement made by the President of the Security Council, the council expressed alarm and concern at the violence involving the civilian population in Lebanon, including at Palestinian refugee camps resulting in casualties.

The Council urged international organisations, such as the International Committee of the Red Cross and United Nations Relief and Works Agency for Palestine Refugees in the Near East to assist in providing humanitarian assistance to the civilian population. It also called on the Government of Lebanon and Secretary-General to ensure the implementation of Resolution 564, of which the council would closely follow.

== See also ==
- Israeli–Lebanese conflict
- Lebanese Civil War
- List of United Nations Security Council Resolutions 501 to 600 (1982–1987)
- South Lebanon conflict (1982–2000)
