= United Nations Security Council Resolution 263 =

UN Security Council Resolution 263
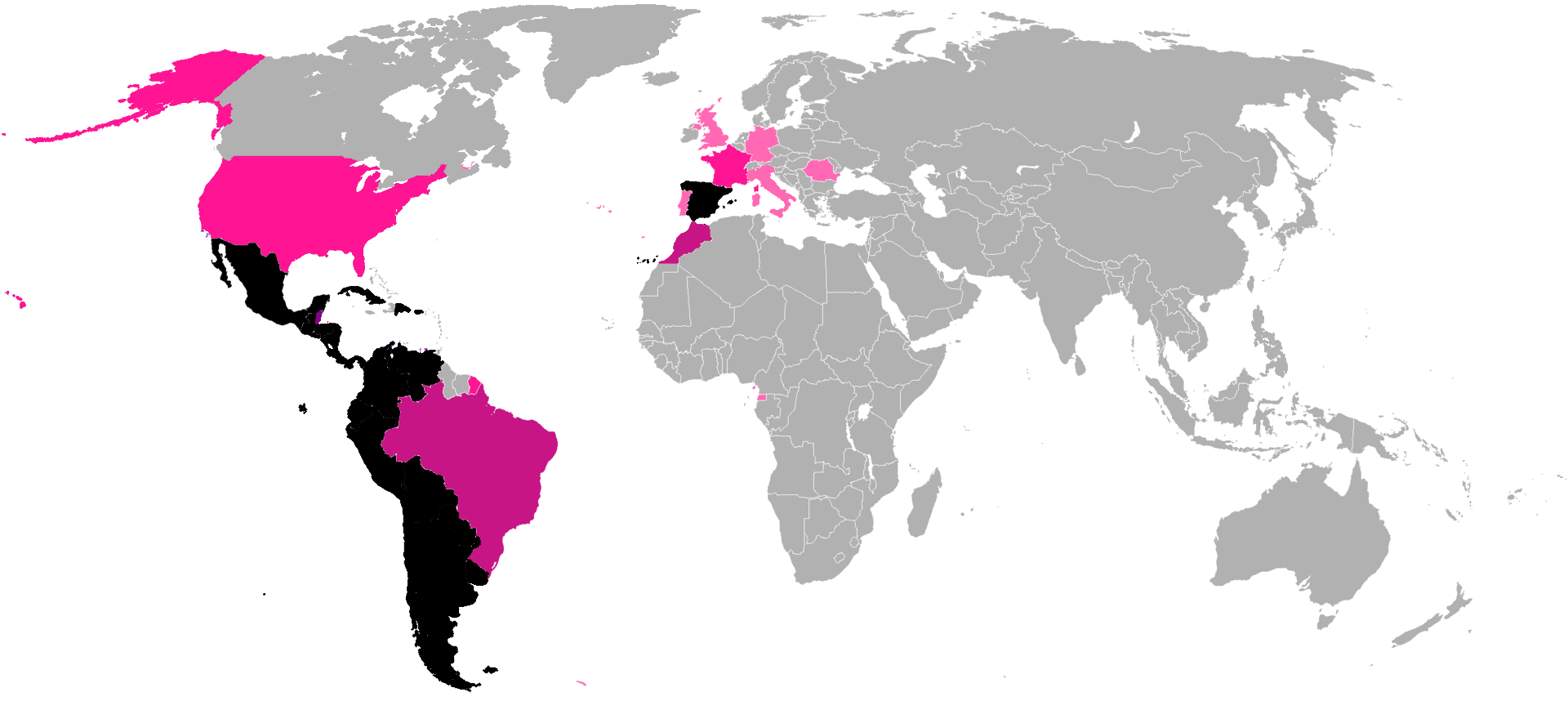
- Geographic distribution of the Spanish language
- Date: January 24 1969
- Meeting no.: 1463
- Code: S/RES/263 (Document)
- Subject: Working languages of the Security-Council
- Result: Adopted

Security Council composition
- Permanent members: China; France; Soviet Union; United Kingdom; United States
- Non-permanent members: Algeria; Colombia; Finland; Hungary; Nepal; Pakistan; Paraguay; Senegal; Spain; Zambia

United Nations Security Council Resolution 263, adopted on January 24, 1969, after the General Assembly passed Resolution 2479 extolling the virtues of expanded working languages, the Council decided to include Russian and Spanish among the working languages of the Security Council.

The resolution was adopted without vote.

== See also ==
- List of United Nations Security Council Resolutions 201 to 300 (1965–1971)
- United Nations Security Council Resolution 345
- United Nations Security Council Resolution 528
