= United Nations Security Council Resolution 568 =

UN Security Council Resolution 568
- Botswana
- Date: 21 June 1985
- Meeting no.: 2,599
- Code: S/RES/568 (Document)
- Subject: Botswana-South Africa
- Voting summary: 15 voted for; None voted against; None abstained
- Result: Adopted

Security Council composition
- Permanent members: China; France; Soviet Union; United Kingdom; United States
- Non-permanent members: Australia; Burkina Faso; Denmark; Egypt; India; Madagascar; Peru; Thailand; Trinidad and Tobago; Ukrainian SSR

United Nations Security Council resolution 568, adopted unanimously on 21 June 1985, after hearing representations from Botswana, the Council condemned the Raid on Gaborone by South Africa, expressing its shock and indignation at the loss of life and damage to property and considered the attack as a "gross violation of the country's sovereignty and territorial integrity".

The Council further condemned all acts of aggression, provocation and harassment including kidnapping, murder and blackmail against Botswana by South Africa, calling for an immediate cessation of these activities. It also condemned South Africa's practice of "hot pursuit" against countries in southern Africa.

The resolution then demanded compensation for Botswana and other countries affected by the attacks, affirming their right to give sanctuary to those fleeing apartheid.

Finally, the Council requested the Secretary-General to send a mission to Botswana to assess the damage and to propose methods to strengthen Botswana's capacity to provide shelter to South African refugees. It also requested international organisations to extend assistance to the country.

Resolution 568 was drafted by Burkina Faso, Egypt, India, Madagascar, Peru and Trinidad and Tobago.

== See also ==
- List of United Nations Security Council Resolutions 501 to 600 (1982–1987)
- South African Border Wars
- South Africa under apartheid
- United Nations Security Council Resolution 572
