= United Nations Security Council Resolution 556 =

UN Security Council Resolution 556
- Date: 23 October 1984
- Meeting no.: 2,560
- Code: S/RES/556 (Document)
- Subject: South Africa
- Voting summary: 14 voted for; None voted against; 1 abstained
- Result: Adopted

Security Council composition
- Permanent members: China; France; Soviet Union; United Kingdom; United States
- Non-permanent members: Burkina Faso; Egypt; India; Malta; Netherlands; Nicaragua; Pakistan; Peru; Ukrainian SSR; Zimbabwe

United Nations Security Council resolution 556, adopted on 23 October 1984, after recalling 554 (1984) and the Universal Declaration of Human Rights, the Council expressed its alarm at the killing of anti-apartheid demonstrators in South Africa, reaffirming that the country's disregard for world opinion will lead to a further escalation of the "explosive situation".

The Council reiterated its opposition to apartheid, demanding the immediate cessation of massacres in South Africa and the release of all political prisoners. It also called on all Member States and international organisations to assist the South African people in their "legitimate struggle for the full exercise of the right to self-determination".

Finally, Resolution 556 called for the dismantling of the bantustans, the removal of bans on anti-apartheid parties, individuals and news media, and requested the Secretary-General to monitor the situation.

The resolution was approved by 14 votes to none against, while the United States abstained from voting.

== See also ==
- Internal resistance to South African apartheid
- List of United Nations Security Council Resolutions 501 to 600 (1982–1987)
- Apartheid
