= United Nations Security Council Resolution 572 =

UN Security Council Resolution 572
- Botswana
- Date: 30 September 1985
- Meeting no.: 2,609
- Code: S/RES/572 (Document)
- Subject: Botswana-South Africa
- Voting summary: 15 voted for; None voted against; None abstained
- Result: Adopted

Security Council composition
- Permanent members: China; France; Soviet Union; United Kingdom; United States
- Non-permanent members: Australia; Burkina Faso; Denmark; Egypt; India; Madagascar; Peru; Thailand; Trinidad and Tobago; Ukrainian SSR

United Nations Security Council resolution 572, adopted unanimously on 30 September 1985, after recalling Resolution 568 (1985) and noting a report from a mission to Botswana appointed by the Secretary-General, the Council endorsed the report regarding a South African attack on the country.

The resolution demanded compensation for Botswana, and requested international assistance from Member States and organisations for the country in the areas identified in the report. It also asked the Secretary-General to keep the situation under observation.

== See also ==
- List of United Nations Security Council Resolutions 501 to 600 (1982–1987)
- South African Border Wars
