= United Nations Security Council Resolution 527 =

UN Security Council Resolution 527
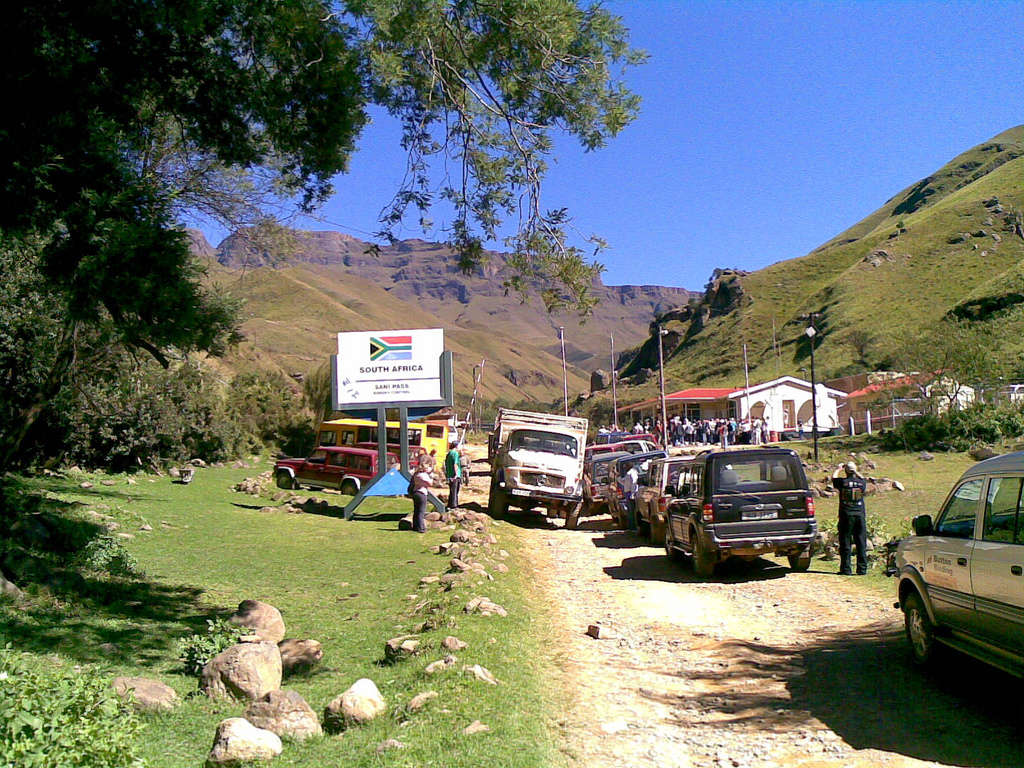
- South Africa-Lesotho border
- Date: 15 December 1982
- Meeting no.: 2,407
- Code: S/RES/527 (Document)
- Subject: South Africa
- Voting summary: 15 voted for; None voted against; None abstained
- Result: Adopted

Security Council composition
- Permanent members: China; France; Soviet Union; United Kingdom; United States
- Non-permanent members: Guyana; Ireland; Jordan; Japan; Panama; Poland; Spain; Togo; Uganda; Zaire

United Nations Security Council resolution 527, adopted unanimously on 15 December 1982, having heard representations from Moshoeshoe II of Lesotho, the Council condemned, alongside a General Assembly resolution, an attack by South Africa on Lesotho, resulting in damage and the deaths of 40 people.

The resolution demanded compensation to Lesotho for the attack, which it also commended for allowing those fleeing apartheid to have sanctuary in the country. It also called on Member States to provide economic assistance to Lesotho. South Africa refused to pay compensation.

The Council reiterated the use of peaceful means to resolve international problems, requesting the Secretary-General to enter into consultations with the Government of Lesotho on humanitarian issues, and to report back to the Council regularly on the implementation of the resolution.

== See also ==
- List of United Nations Security Council Resolutions 501 to 600 (1982–1987)
- South African Border War
- South Africa under apartheid
