= United Nations Security Council Resolution 285 =

UN Security Council Resolution 285
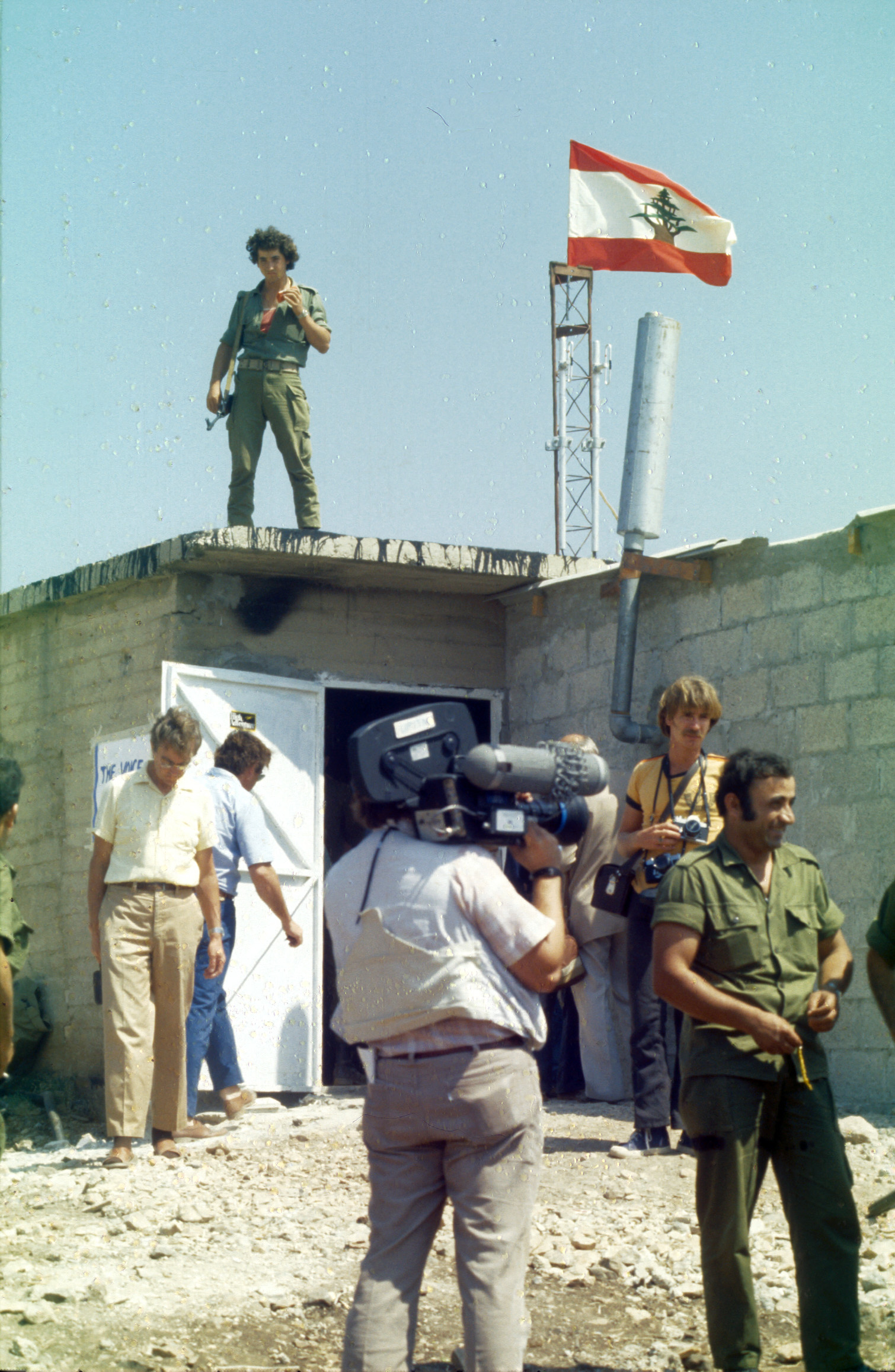
- Lebanese border
- Date: September 5 1970
- Meeting no.: 1,551
- Code: S/RES/285 (Document)
- Subject: The situation in the Middle East
- Voting summary: 14 voted for; None voted against; 1 abstained
- Result: Adopted

Security Council composition
- Permanent members: China; France; Soviet Union; United Kingdom; United States
- Non-permanent members: Burundi; Colombia; Finland; Nepal; Poland; Spain; Syria; Zambia

United Nations Security Council Resolution 285, adopted on September 5, 1970, at 14 words is the shortest UNSC resolution ever adopted (with one word less than 279); it reads simply "Demands the complete and immediate withdrawal of all Israeli armed forces from Lebanese territory."

The resolution was adopted by 14 votes to none, while the United States abstained. The resolution came in the context of Palestinian insurgency in South Lebanon.

== See also ==
- History of Lebanon
- List of United Nations Security Council Resolutions 201 to 300 (1965–1971)
