= United Nations Security Council Resolution 205 =

UN Security Council Resolution 205
- Flag-map of the Dominican Republic
- Date: May 22 1965
- Meeting no.: 1217
- Subject: The situation in the Dominican Republic
- Voting summary: 10 voted for; None voted against; 1 abstained
- Result: Adopted

Security Council composition
- Permanent members: China; France; Soviet Union; United Kingdom; United States
- Non-permanent members: Bolivia; Ivory Coast; Jordan; Malaysia; Netherlands; Uruguay

United Nations Security Council Resolution 205, adopted on May 22, 1965, in the face of a potentially widening conflict in the Dominican Republic, the Council requested that the temporary suspension of hostilities in Santo Domingo called for in United Nations Security Council Resolution 203 be transformed into a permanent cease-fire and invited the Secretary-General to submit a report to the Council on the implementation of this resolution.

The resolution was adopted by ten votes to none; the United States abstained.

In the days following the resolution, a de facto cessation of hostilities took place in Santo Domingo.

== See also ==
- Dominican Civil War
- List of United Nations Security Council Resolutions 201 to 300 (1965–1971)
- Operation Power Pack
