= United Nations Security Council Resolution 240 =

United Nations Security Council resolution

UN Security Council Resolution 240
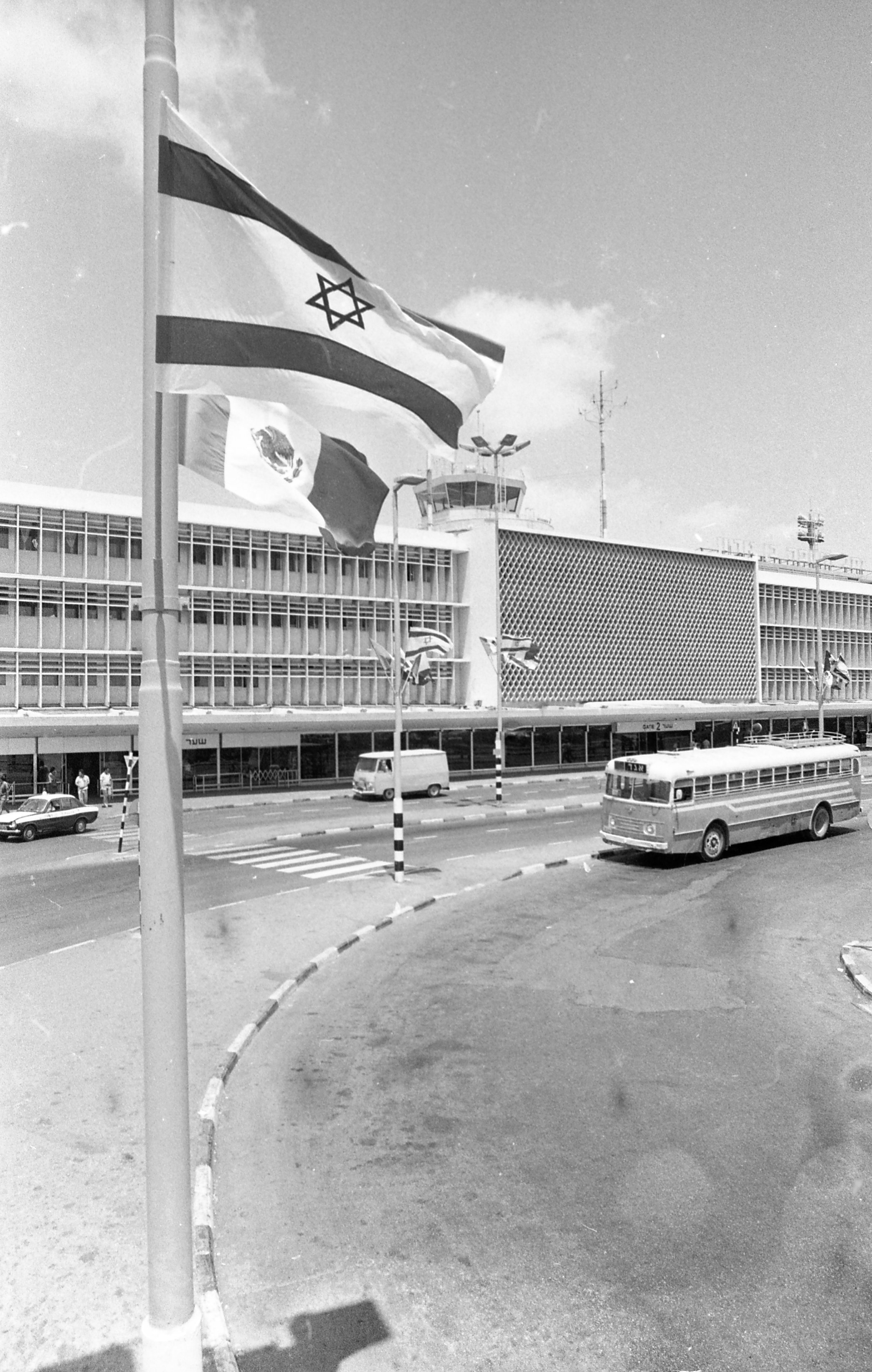
- Israel flag
- Date: October 25 1967
- Meeting no.: 1371
- Code: S/RES/240 (Document)
- Subject: The situation in the Middle East
- Voting summary: 15 voted for; None voted against; None abstained
- Result: Adopted

Security Council composition
- Permanent members: China; France; Soviet Union; United Kingdom; United States
- Non-permanent members: Argentina; Brazil; Bulgaria; Canada; Denmark; Ethiopia; India; Japan; Mali; Nigeria

United Nations Security Council Resolution 240, adopted on October 25, 1967, condemned the violations of the cease-fire worked out in past resolutions (primarily United Nations Security Council Resolution 234) and expressed its regrets at the casualties and loss of property that resulted from the violations. The Council reaffirmed the necessity of the strict observance of the cease-fire resolutions and demanded that the member states concerned cease immediately all prohibited military activities in the area and co-operate fully and promptly with the United Nations Truce Supervision Organization.

The meeting, requested by Israel, Syria and the United Arab Republic to contest various allegations, adopted the resolution unanimously.

== See also ==
- List of United Nations Security Council Resolutions 201 to 300 (1965–1971)
- Six-Day War
