= United Nations Security Council Resolution 236 =

United Nations Security Council resolution

UN Security Council Resolution 236
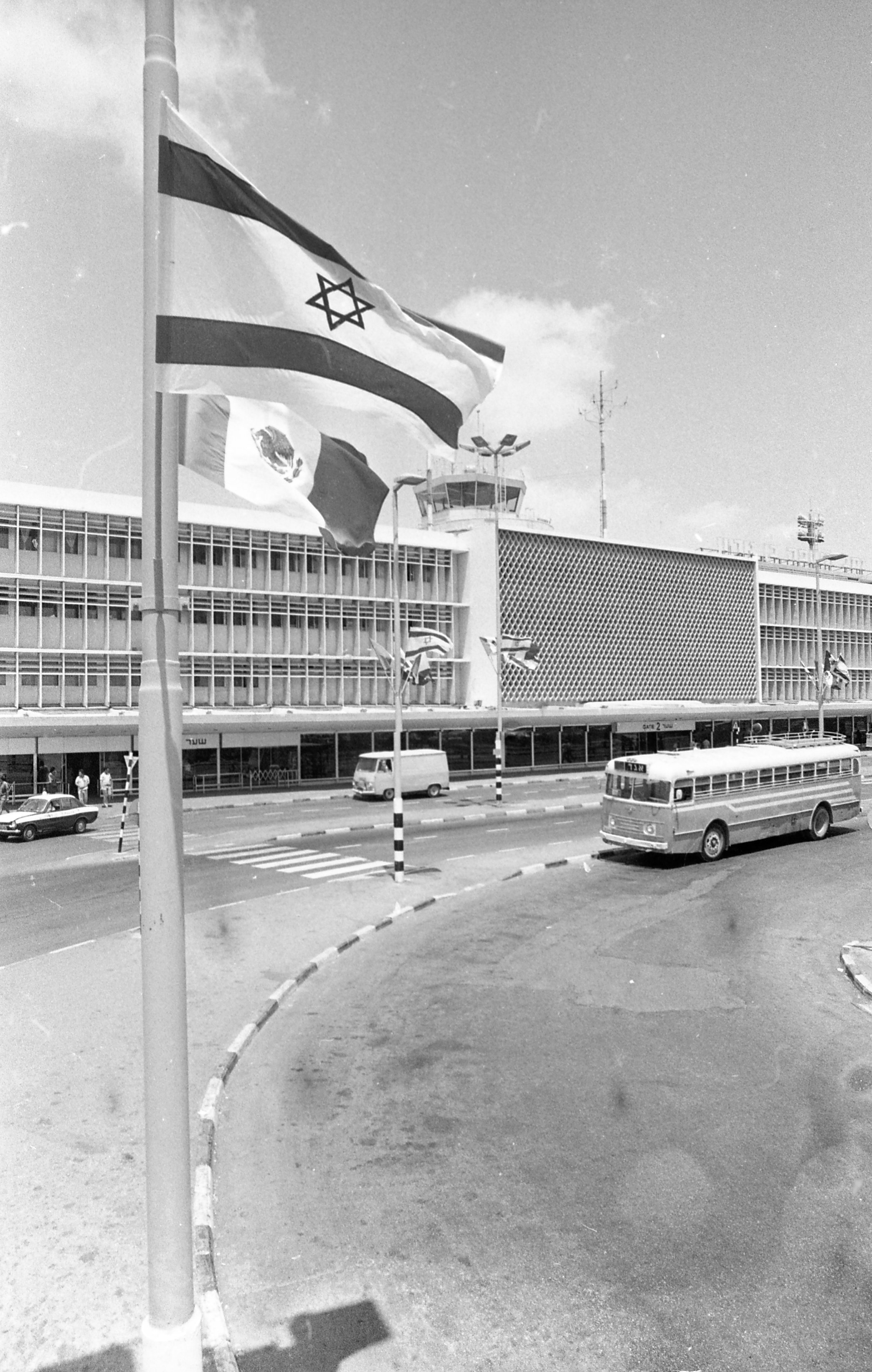
- Israel flag
- Date: June 11 1967
- Meeting no.: 1357
- Subject: The situation in the Middle East
- Voting summary: 15 voted for; None voted against; None abstained
- Result: Adopted

Security Council composition
- Permanent members: China; France; Soviet Union; United Kingdom; United States
- Non-permanent members: Argentina; Brazil; Bulgaria; Canada; Denmark; Ethiopia; India; Japan; Mali; Nigeria

United Nations Security Council Resolution 236, adopted on June 11, 1967, after noting the oral reports of the Secretary-General, the Council condemned any violations of the cease-fire called for in resolution 234. The Council requested that the Secretary-General continue his investigations and report back as soon as possible and affirmed its demand for a cease-fire. The Council called for the prompt return to the cease-fire positions of any troops which may have moved forward subsequent to 16:30 hours GMT on June 10, 1967, and called for the full co-operation with the Chief of Staff of the United Nations Truce Supervision Organization and the observers in implementing the cease-fire.

The meeting, requested by Syria, adopted resolution 236 unanimously.

== See also ==
- List of United Nations Security Council Resolutions 201 to 300 (1965–1971)
- Six-Day War
