= United Nations Security Council Resolution 295 =

UN Security Council Resolution 295
- Date: August 3 1971
- Meeting no.: 1,573
- Code: S/RES/295 (Document)
- Subject: Complaint by Guinea
- Voting summary: 15 voted for; None voted against; None abstained
- Result: Adopted

Security Council composition
- Permanent members: China; France; Soviet Union; United Kingdom; United States
- Non-permanent members: Argentina; Belgium; Burundi; Italy; Japan; Nicaragua; Poland; Sierra Leone; Somalia; Syria

United Nations Security Council Resolution 295, was adopted unanimously on August 3, 1971. After receiving a letter from the Permanent Representative of Guinea, a country led by Ahmed Sékou Touré, the Council affirmed its territorial integrity and independence and decided to send a mission of three members of the Council to Guinea to consult with the authorities and report of the situation immediately. The mission was to be appointed after consultation between the president of the Council and the Secretary-General.

The request for this resolution from the Government of Guinea came after a series of cross border incursions by the Portuguese led colonial government of Portuguese Guinea in early 1971, against PAIGC independentist guerrilla bases in Guinea and the regime of the country which supported and was giving shelter to their leaders. This in turn came a year after the invasion of Guinea's capital, Conakry, (Operation Green Sea) on 22 November 1970 by Portuguese-led forces that rescued Portuguese Army's POWs and destroyed military assets of the guerrillas. These attacks ceased, but border tensions continued until Guinea-Bissau's independence on September 10, 1974 due to the events of the Carnation Revolution in Lisbon, on April 25, 1974.

== See also ==
- Guinea-Bissau War of Independence
- List of United Nations Security Council Resolutions 201 to 300 (1965–1971)
- Portuguese Empire
- United Nations Security Council Resolution 294
