= United Nations Security Council Resolution 270 =

UN Security Council Resolution 270
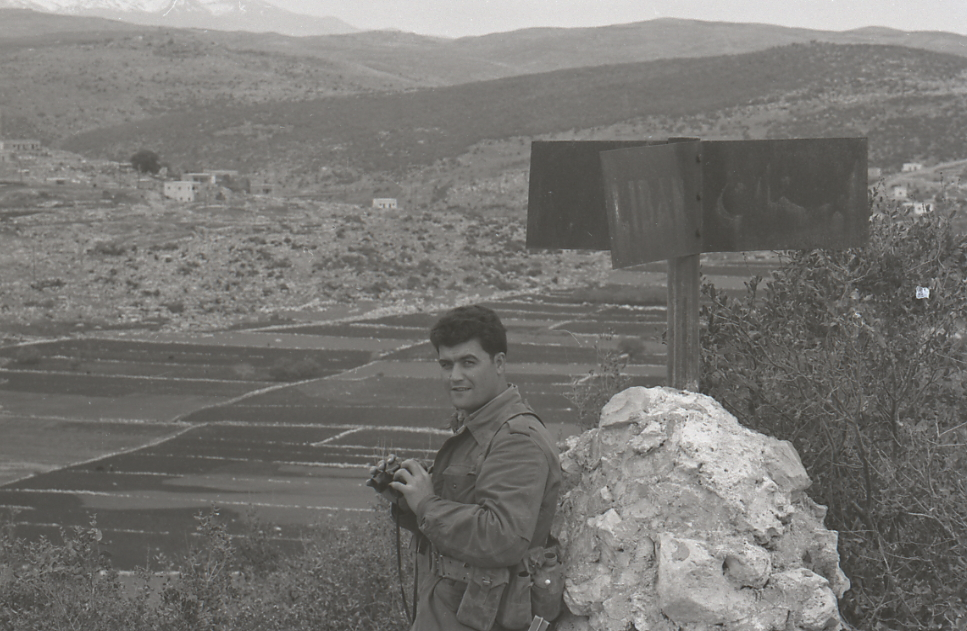
- Lebanese border
- Date: August 26 1969
- Meeting no.: 1,504
- Code: S/RES/270 (Document)
- Subject: The situation in the Middle East
- Result: Adopted

Security Council composition
- Permanent members: China; France; Soviet Union; United Kingdom; United States
- Non-permanent members: Algeria; Colombia; Finland; Hungary; Nepal; Pakistan; Paraguay; Senegal; Spain; Zambia

United Nations Security Council Resolution 270, adopted on August 26, 1969, after an air attack by Israel on Southern Lebanon, the Council condemned Israel and deplored all incidents in violation of the cease-fire and the extension of the area of fighting. The Council also declared that such grave violations of the cease-fire could not be tolerated and that the Council would have to consider further and more effective steps as envisaged in the Charter.

The resolution was adopted without vote.

== See also ==
- Arab–Israeli conflict
- List of United Nations Security Council Resolutions 201 to 300 (1965–1971)
