= United Nations Security Council Resolution 256 =

UN Security Council Resolution 256
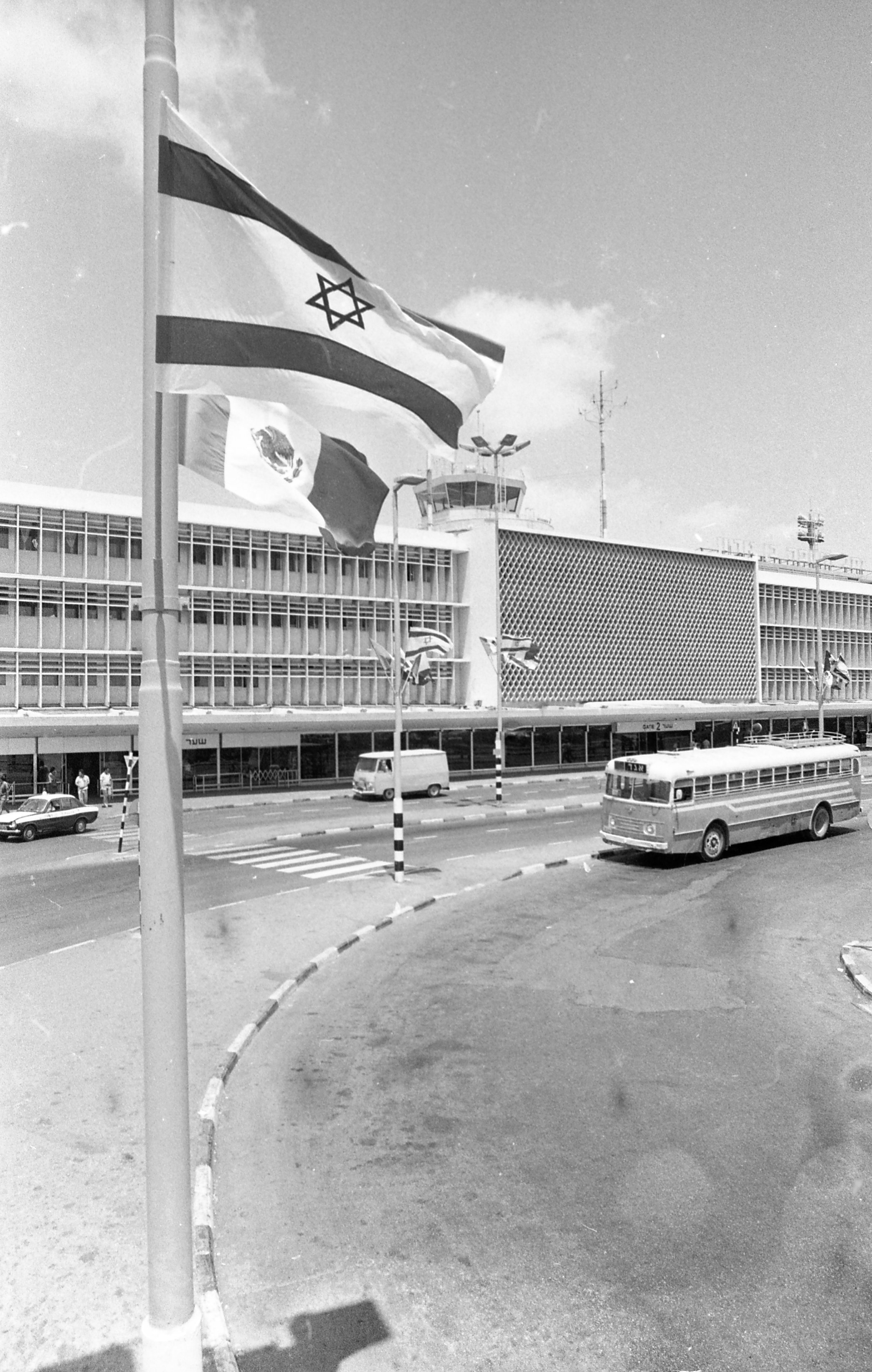
- Israel flag
- Date: 16 August 1968
- Meeting no.: 1440
- Code: S/RES/256 (Document)
- Subject: The situation in the Middle East
- Voting summary: 15 voted for; None voted against; None abstained
- Result: Adopted

Security Council composition
- Permanent members: China; France; Soviet Union; United Kingdom; United States
- Non-permanent members: Algeria; Brazil; Canada; Denmark; Ethiopia; Hungary; India; Pakistan; Paraguay; Senegal

United Nations Security Council Resolution 256, adopted unanimously on 16 August 1968, after two air attacks on Jordan were launched by Israel, the Council declared that grave violations of the cease-fire cannot be tolerated. The Council deplored the loss of life and heavy damage to property and condemned the further military attacks launched by Israel as flagrant violations of the Charter, warning that if such attacks were to be repeated, the council would duly take account of the failure to comply with the present resolution.

== See also ==
- Arab–Israeli conflict
- List of United Nations Security Council Resolutions 201 to 300 (1965–1971)
