= United Nations Security Council Resolution 206 =

UN Security Council Resolution 206
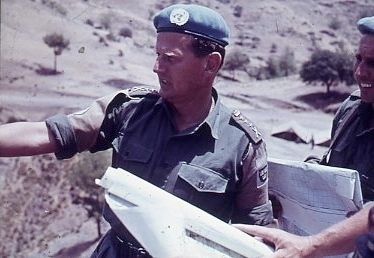
- Peacekeeping in Cyprus
- Date: June 15 1965
- Meeting no.: 1224
- Subject: The Cyprus Question
- Voting summary: 11 voted for; None voted against; None abstained
- Result: Adopted

Security Council composition
- Permanent members: China; France; Soviet Union; United Kingdom; United States
- Non-permanent members: Bolivia; Ivory Coast; Jordan; Malaysia; Netherlands; Uruguay

United Nations Security Council Resolution 206, adopted unanimously on June 15, 1965, after reaffirming previous resolutions on the topic, the Council extended the stationing in Cyprus of the United Nations Peacekeeping Force in Cyprus for an additional 6 months, now ending on December 26, 1965. The Council also called upon all member states to comply with this and previous resolutions, and upon the parties directly concerned to continue to act with the utmost restraint and to co-operate fully with the peacekeeping force.

== See also ==
- Cyprus dispute
- List of United Nations Security Council Resolutions 201 to 300 (1965–1971)
