= United Nations Security Council Resolution 275 =

UN Security Council Resolution 275
- Date: December 22 1969
- Meeting no.: 1,526
- Code: S/RES/275 (Document)
- Subject: Complaint by Guinea
- Voting summary: 9 voted for; None voted against; 6 abstained
- Result: Adopted

Security Council composition
- Permanent members: China; France; Soviet Union; United Kingdom; United States
- Non-permanent members: Algeria; Colombia; Finland; Hungary; Nepal; Pakistan; Paraguay; Senegal; Spain; Zambia

United Nations Security Council Resolution 275, adopted on December 22, 1969, after a letter from the representative of Guinea and observing that these incidents by Portugal jeopardize international peace and security, the Council called upon Portugal to desist from violating the sovereignty and territorial integrity of Guinea. The Council deeply deplored the loss of life and heavy damage to several Guinean villages inflicted by the action from Guinea-Bissau, a territory under Portuguese administration, solemnly warning Portugal that if such acts were to be repeated in the future the Council would consider further steps to give effect to the resolution. It also called upon Portugal to release a motor barge by the name of Patrice Lumumba and all of its passengers.

The resolution was passed with nine votes, with six abstentions from the Republic of China, Colombia, France, Spain, the United Kingdom and United States.

Guinea had first wrote to the Security Council on December 4, 1969, to request action, which was supported by 40 African states. It informed the Council of further airstrikes on its territory on December 12, prompting meetings to be held and a resolution to be passed.

== See also ==
- Guinea-Bissau War of Independence
- List of United Nations Security Council Resolutions 201 to 300 (1965–1971)
- Portuguese Empire
