= United Nations Security Council Resolution 226 =

UN Security Council Resolution 226
- Date: October 14 1966
- Meeting no.: 1306
- Subject: Question concerning the Democratic Republic of Congo
- Voting summary: 15 voted for; None voted against; None abstained
- Result: Adopted

Security Council composition
- Permanent members: China; France; Soviet Union; United Kingdom; United States
- Non-permanent members: Argentina; Bulgaria; Japan; Jordan; Mali; Netherlands; New Zealand; Nigeria; Uganda; Uruguay

United Nations Security Council Resolution 226 was adopted unanimously by the United Nations Security Council on October 14, 1966. The Council urged the government of Portugal to prevent foreign mercenaries in the Portuguese territory of Angola from interfering in the domestic affairs of the Democratic Republic of the Congo (DRC).

The Council called upon all member states to refrain or desist from intervening in the domestic affairs of the DRC.

== See also ==
- Colonial history of Angola
- Congo Crisis
- List of United Nations Security Council Resolutions 201 to 300 (1965–1971)
- Portuguese Empire
