= United Nations Security Council Resolution 238 =

United Nations Security Council resolution

UN Security Council Resolution 238
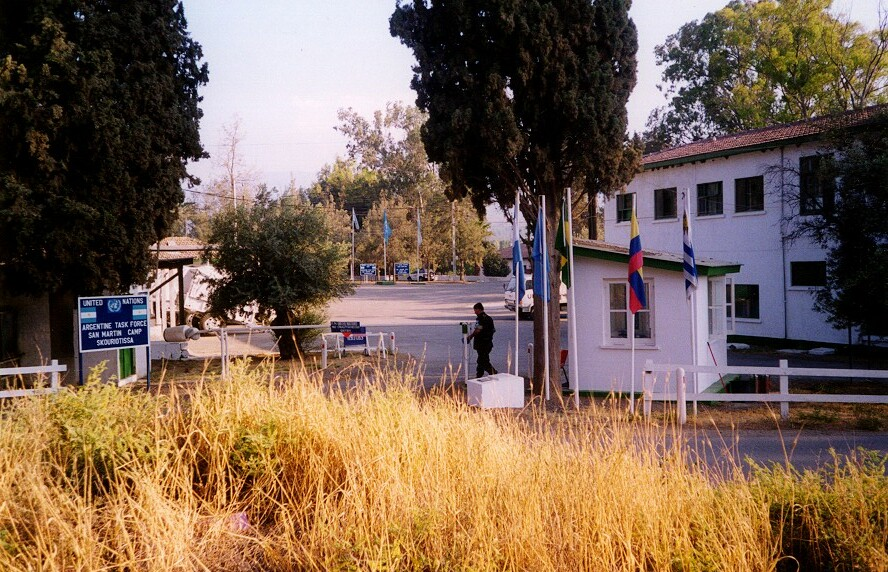
- The Argentine Contingent's San Martin Camp in Cyprus.
- Date: June 19 1967
- Meeting no.: 1362
- Subject: The Cyprus Question
- Voting summary: 15 voted for; None voted against; None abstained
- Result: Adopted

Security Council composition
- Permanent members: China; France; Soviet Union; United Kingdom; United States
- Non-permanent members: Argentina; Brazil; Bulgaria; Canada; Denmark; Ethiopia; India; Japan; Mali; Nigeria

United Nations Security Council Resolution 238, adopted unanimously on June 19, 1967, after reaffirming previous resolutions on the topic, the Council extended the stationing in Cyprus of the United Nations Peacekeeping Force in Cyprus for an additional 6 months, now ending on December 26, 1967. The Council also called upon the parties directly concerned to continue to act with the utmost restraint and to co-operate fully with the peacekeeping force.

== See also ==
- Cyprus dispute
- List of United Nations Security Council Resolutions 201 to 300 (1965–1971)
