= United Nations Security Council Resolution 201 =

UN Security Council Resolution 201
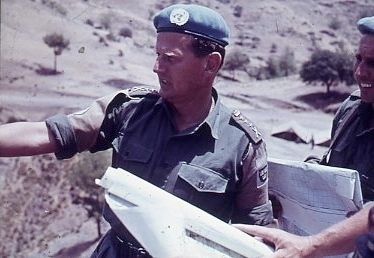
- Peacekeeping in Cyprus
- Date: March 19 1965
- Meeting no.: 1193
- Subject: The Cyprus Question
- Voting summary: 11 voted for; None voted against; None abstained
- Result: Adopted

Security Council composition
- Permanent members: China; France; Soviet Union; United Kingdom; United States
- Non-permanent members: Bolivia; Ivory Coast; Jordan; Malaysia; Netherlands; Uruguay

United Nations Security Council Resolution 201, adopted unanimously on March 19, 1965, after reaffirming its previous resolutions on the topic and thanking all that nations who had contributed to it, extended the stationing of the United Nations Peacekeeping Force in Cyprus for another three months, to end on June 26, 1965.

== See also ==
- Cyprus dispute
- List of United Nations Security Council Resolutions 201 to 300 (1965–1971)
