= United Nations Security Council Resolution 219 =

UN Security Council Resolution 219
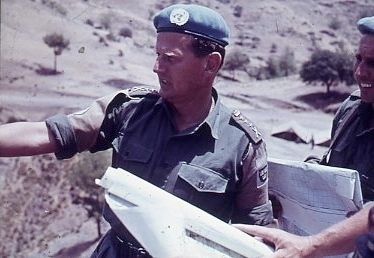
- Peacekeeping in Cyprus
- Date: December 17 1965
- Meeting no.: 1270
- Subject: The Cyprus Question
- Voting summary: 11 voted for; None voted against; None abstained
- Result: Adopted

Security Council composition
- Permanent members: China; France; Soviet Union; United Kingdom; United States
- Non-permanent members: Bolivia; Ivory Coast; Jordan; Malaysia; Netherlands; Uruguay

United Nations Security Council Resolution 219, adopted unanimously on December 17, 1965, after reaffirming previous resolutions on the topic, the Council extended the stationing in Cyprus of the United Nations Peacekeeping Force in Cyprus for an additional 3 months, now ending on March 26, 1966.

The resolution was the last to be adopted by 11 member states. The following year, membership of the Security Council increased to 15 members.

== See also ==
- Cyprus dispute
- List of United Nations Security Council Resolutions 201 to 300 (1965–1971)
