= United Nations Security Council Resolution 208 =

UN Security Council Resolution 208
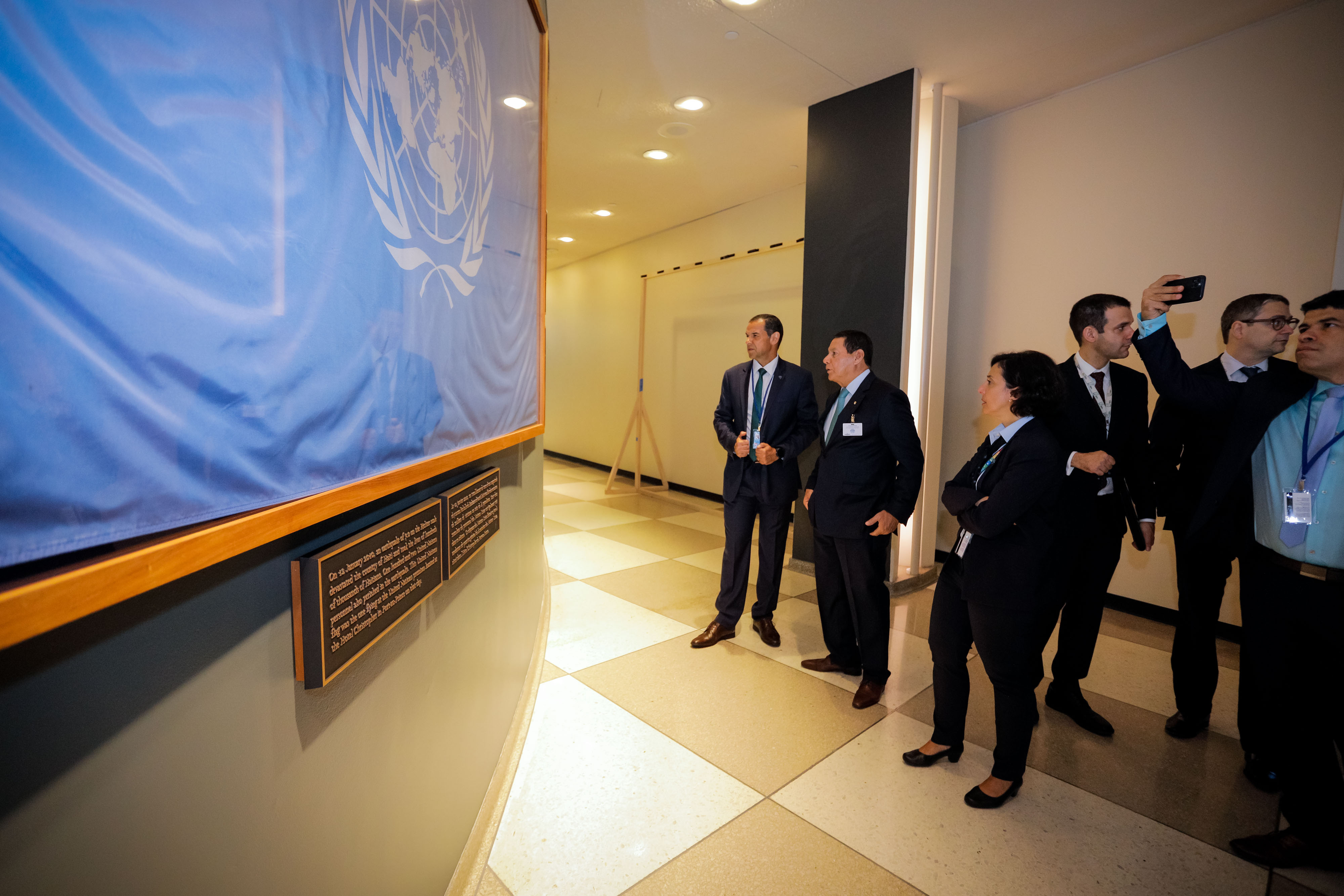
- UN Security Council headquarters
- Date: August 10 1965
- Meeting no.: 1236
- Subject: International Court of Justice
- Result: Adopted

Security Council composition
- Permanent members: China; France; Soviet Union; United Kingdom; United States
- Non-permanent members: Bolivia; Ivory Coast; Jordan; Malaysia; Netherlands; Uruguay

United Nations Security Council Resolution 208, adopted on August 10, 1965, after noting with regret the death of Judge Abdel Hamid Badawi, a judge on the International Court of Justice, the Council decided that the election to fill the vacancy would take place during the twentieth session of the General Assembly.

The resolution was adopted without vote.

== See also ==
- List of United Nations Security Council Resolutions 201 to 300 (1965–1971)
