= United Nations Security Council Resolution 280 =

UN Security Council Resolution 280
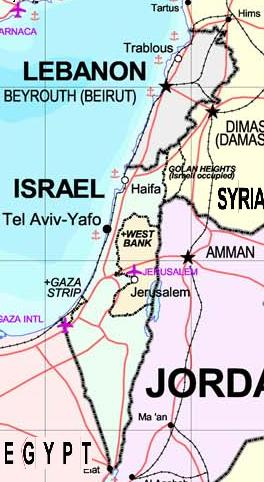
- Israel and Lebanon
- Date: May 19 1970
- Meeting no.: 1,542
- Code: S/RES/280 (Document)
- Subject: The Situation in the Middle East
- Voting summary: 11 voted for; None voted against; 4 abstained
- Result: Adopted

Security Council composition
- Permanent members: China; France; Soviet Union; United Kingdom; United States
- Non-permanent members: Burundi; Colombia; Finland; Nepal; Poland; Spain; Syria; Zambia

United Nations Security Council Resolution 280 was adopted on May 19, 1970. After reaffirming its previous resolutions on the topic, the Council condemned Israel for its premeditated military action in violation of its obligations under the Charter. The resolution declared that such armed attacks could no longer be tolerated and that if they were the Council would consider taking adequate and effective steps in accordance with the Charter. The Council also deplored the loss of life and damage to property. The resolution came in the context of Palestinian insurgency in South Lebanon.

The resolution was adopted with 11 votes; Colombia, Nicaragua, Sierra Leone and the United States abstained from voting.

== See also ==
- List of United Nations Security Council Resolutions 201 to 300 (1965–1971)
