= United Nations Security Council Resolution 284 =

UN Security Council Resolution 284
- Date: July 29 1970
- Meeting no.: 1,550
- Code: S/RES/284 (Document)
- Subject: The situation in Namibia
- Voting summary: 12 voted for; None voted against; 3 abstained
- Result: Adopted

Security Council composition
- Permanent members: China; France; Soviet Union; United Kingdom; United States
- Non-permanent members: Burundi; Colombia; Finland; Nepal; Poland; Spain; Syria; Zambia

United Nations Security Council Resolution 284, adopted on July 29, 1970, submitted the following question to the International Court of Justice for an advisory opinion: "What are the legal consequences for States of the continued presence of South Africa in Namibia notwithstanding Security Council resolution 276 (1970)?". The Council requested the Secretary-General transmit the resolution, along with all documents likely to shed light on the question to the Court.

The resolution was adopted by 12 votes; the People's Republic of Poland, Soviet Union and the United Kingdom abstained.

In response, in 1971, the Court issued the Consequences for States opinion, which held that South Africa's occupation of Namibia was unlawful, that all members of the UN were required to recognize that illegality, and that South Africa must withdraw. The UN General Assembly welcomed the Court's opinion with General Assembly Resolution 2871 on December 20, 1971.

== See also ==
- History of Namibia
- List of United Nations Security Council Resolutions 201 to 300 (1965–1971)
- United Nations Commissioner for Namibia
