= United Nations Security Council Resolution 289 =

UN Security Council Resolution 289
- Date: November 23 1970
- Meeting no.: 1,558
- Code: S/RES/289 (Document)
- Subject: Complaint by Guinea
- Voting summary: 15 voted for; None voted against; None abstained
- Result: Adopted

Security Council composition
- Permanent members: China; France; Soviet Union; United Kingdom; United States
- Non-permanent members: Burundi; Colombia; Finland; Nepal; Poland; Spain; Syria; Zambia

United Nations Security Council Resolution 289, adopted unanimously on November 23, 1970, following several previous incursions into the Republic of Guinea by Portuguese troops, the Council demanded the immediate withdrawal of all external armed forces, mercenaries and military equipment and decided that a special mission, to be formed after consultation between the President of the Security Council and the Secretary-General, would be sent to the territory.

== See also ==
- List of United Nations Security Council Resolutions 201 to 300 (1965–1971)
- Portuguese Empire
- Portuguese Guinea
- Portuguese invasion of Guinea (1970)
