= United Nations Security Council Resolution 272 =

United Nations Security Council resolution

UN Security Council Resolution 272
- Date: October 23 1969
- Meeting no.: 1,514
- Code: S/RES/272 (Document)
- Subject: International Court of Justice
- Result: Adopted

Security Council composition
- Permanent members: China; France; Soviet Union; United Kingdom; United States
- Non-permanent members: Algeria; Colombia; Finland; Hungary; Nepal; Pakistan; Paraguay; Senegal; Spain; Zambia

United Nations Security Council Resolution 272, adopted on October 23, 1969, regarding the General Assembly including an item relating to the amendment of the Statute of the International Court of Justice on the agenda of its 24th session, the Council has authority to make recommendations to the Assembly regarding the participation of nations party to the Statute but not members of the UN and decided to do so.

The Council recommended that those nations be allowed to participate in regard to amendments as though they were members and that amendments would come into force when they had been adopted by a vote of two-thirds of all the States party to the Statute and ratified by those states.

The resolution was adopted without vote.

== See also ==
- List of United Nations Security Council Resolutions 201 to 300 (1965–1971)
