= United Nations Security Council Resolution 283 =

UN Security Council Resolution 283
- Date: July 29 1970
- Meeting no.: 1,550
- Code: S/RES/283 (Document)
- Subject: The situation in Namibia
- Voting summary: 13 voted for; None voted against; 2 abstained
- Result: Adopted

Security Council composition
- Permanent members: China; France; Soviet Union; United Kingdom; United States
- Non-permanent members: Burundi; Colombia; Finland; Nepal; Poland; Spain; Syria; Zambia

United Nations Security Council Resolution 283 was a United Nations Security Council resolution adopted July 29, 1970. It was adopted by 13 votes to none, with France and the United Kingdom abstaining.

In the resolution the Security Council "noted with great concern the continued flagrant refusal of the Government of South Africa to comply with the decisions of the Security Council demanding the immediate withdrawal of South Africa" from Namibia.

The Council called upon all states to refrain from any diplomatic activities which might imply recognition of South African authority over the territory and called upon all the states which had diplomatic relations with Pretoria to issue a formal declaration to the effect that they do not recognize such an authority and consider the continued South African presence to be illegal.

The Council called upon all states to ensure all state-owned and controlled companies to cease dealings with Namibia, to withhold loans and investments to Namibia and Namibians, and to discourage the promotion of tourism and emigration Namibia.

A further request was made for states to re-examine bilateral treaties with South Africa in so far as these treaties applied to the territory. The Security Council also requested the Secretary-General to examine all multilateral treaties with South Africa in so far as they applied to the territory, that the United Nations Council for Namibia to make available to it the results of its studies and proposals with regard to the issuance of passports and visas for Namibians, and that the General Assembly set up a fund to provide assistance to Namibians who have suffered persecution and to finance a comprehensive educational and training program for Namibians in the territory. Finally, the Council re-established the Ad Hoc Sub-Committee on Namibia to study further recommendations on ways the relevant resolutions could be implemented.

== See also ==
- History of Namibia
- List of United Nations Security Council Resolutions 201 to 300 (1965–1971)
- United Nations Commissioner for Namibia
