= United Nations Security Council Resolution 207 =

UN Security Council Resolution 207
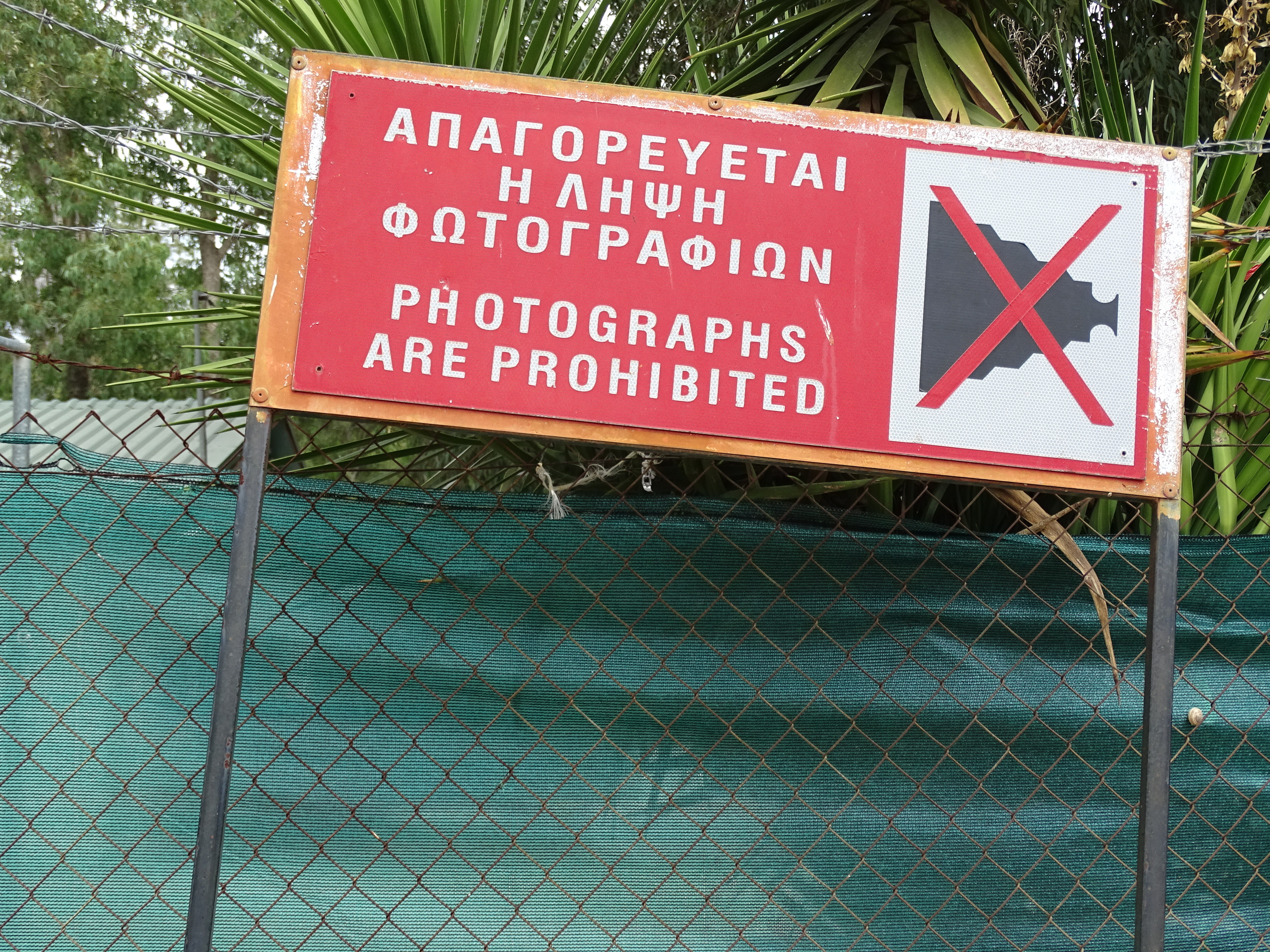
- Prohibition sign in Nicosia
- Date: August 10 1965
- Meeting no.: 1236
- Subject: The Cyprus Question
- Voting summary: 11 voted for; None voted against; None abstained
- Result: Adopted

Security Council composition
- Permanent members: China; France; Soviet Union; United Kingdom; United States
- Non-permanent members: Bolivia; Ivory Coast; Jordan; Malaysia; Netherlands; Uruguay

United Nations Security Council Resolution 207, adopted unanimously on August 10, 1965, after a receiving report by the Secretary-General stating that recent developments in Cyprus had increased tension on the island, the Council reaffirmed its Resolution 186 and called upon all parties to avoid any action which would be likely to worsen the situation.

== See also ==
- Cyprus dispute
- List of United Nations Security Council Resolutions 201 to 300 (1965–1971)
