= United Nations Security Council Resolution 244 =

United Nations Security Council resolution

UN Security Council Resolution 244
- Location of Cyprus within Europe
- Date: December 22 1967
- Meeting no.: 1386
- Code: S/RES/244 (Document)
- Subject: Question concerning the United Nations Peacekeeping Force in Cyprus
- Voting summary: 15 voted for; None voted against; None abstained
- Result: Adopted

Security Council composition
- Permanent members: China; France; Soviet Union; United Kingdom; United States
- Non-permanent members: Argentina; Brazil; Bulgaria; Canada; Denmark; Ethiopia; India; Japan; Mali; Nigeria

United Nations Security Council Resolution 244, adopted unanimously on December 22, 1967, after reaffirming previous resolutions on the topic the Council extended the stationing in Cyprus of the United Nations Peacekeeping Force in Cyprus for an additional 3 months, now ending on March 26, 1968. The Council also called upon the parties directly concerned to continue to act with the utmost restraint and to co-operate fully with the peacekeeping force.

This is the first of the resolutions regarding the stationing of the force since 1965 which did not express the hope that it would be removed at the end of the extended stationing.

== See also ==
- Cyprus dispute
- List of United Nations Security Council Resolutions 201 to 300 (1965–1971)
