= United Nations Security Council Resolution 286 =

UN Security Council Resolution 286
- Date: September 9 1970
- Meeting no.: 1,552
- Code: S/RES/286 (Document)
- Subject: The situation created by increasing incidents involving the hijacking of commercial aircraft
- Voting summary: 15 voted for
- Result: Adopted

Security Council composition
- Permanent members: China; France; Soviet Union; United Kingdom; United States
- Non-permanent members: Burundi; Colombia; Finland; Nepal; Poland; Spain; Syria; Zambia

United Nations Security Council Resolution 286 was adopted unanimously on September 9, 1970. The Council expressed grave concern over the threat to innocent civilians from the hijacking of aircraft and other international travel. It appealed to all parties concerned for the immediate release of all passengers and crews without exception, held as a result of hijackings and other interference in international travel and called on state to take all possible legal measures to prevent further hijackings and interferences in international civil air travel.

The resolution was adopted without vote.

== See also ==
- Dawson's Field hijackings
- List of United Nations Security Council Resolutions 201 to 300 (1965–1971)
