= United Nations Security Council Resolution 224 =

UN Security Council Resolution 224
- Date: October 14 1966
- Meeting no.: 1306
- Subject: Admission of new Members to the UN: Botswana
- Voting summary: 15 voted for; None voted against; None abstained
- Result: Adopted

Security Council composition
- Permanent members: China; France; Soviet Union; United Kingdom; United States
- Non-permanent members: Argentina; Bulgaria; Japan; Jordan; Mali; Netherlands; New Zealand; Nigeria; Uganda; Uruguay

United Nations Security Council Resolution 224 was adopted unanimously by the United Nations Security Council on October 14, 1966. The Council recommended that the General Assembly admit Botswana as a member state.

== See also ==
- List of United Nations Security Council Resolutions 201 to 300 (1965–1971)
