= United Nations Security Council Resolution 212 =

UN Security Council Resolution 212
- Date: September 20 1965
- Meeting no.: 1243
- Subject: Admission of new Members to the UN: Maldives Islands
- Voting summary: 11 voted for; None voted against; None abstained
- Result: Adopted

Security Council composition
- Permanent members: China; France; Soviet Union; United Kingdom; United States
- Non-permanent members: Bolivia; Ivory Coast; Jordan; Malaysia; Netherlands; Uruguay

United Nations Security Council Resolution 212, adopted unanimously on September 20, 1965, after examining the application of the Maldive Islands for membership in the United Nations, the Council recommended to the General Assembly that the Maldive Islands be admitted.

== See also ==
- List of United Nations Security Council Resolutions 201 to 300 (1965–1971)
