= United Nations Security Council Resolution 218 =

UN Security Council Resolution 218
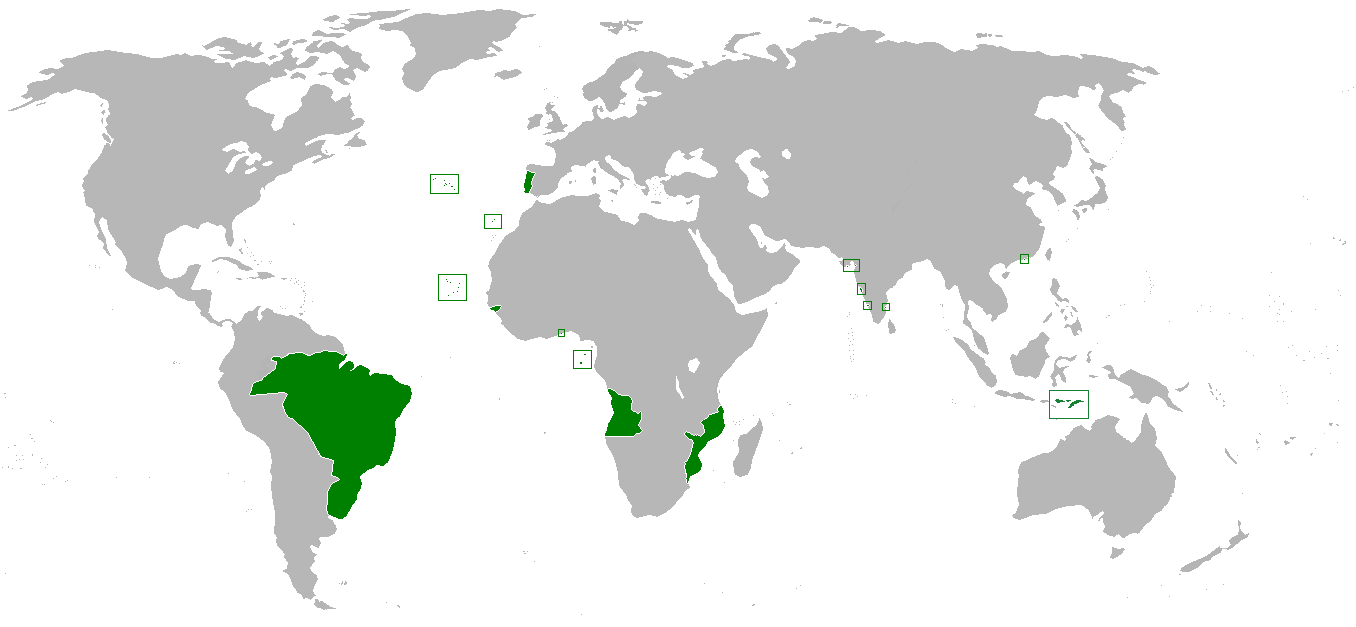
- Map of the Portuguese Empire
- Date: November 23 1965
- Meeting no.: 1268
- Subject: Question relating to Territories under Portuguese administration
- Voting summary: 7 voted for; None voted against; 4 abstained
- Result: Adopted

Security Council composition
- Permanent members: China; France; Soviet Union; United Kingdom; United States
- Non-permanent members: Bolivia; Ivory Coast; Jordan; Malaysia; Netherlands; Uruguay

United Nations Security Council Resolution 218, adopted on November 23, 1965, after recalling previous resolutions on the topic, and Portugal's failure to implement them, the Council again demanded that Portugal withdrawal its military presence from her colonies and enter negotiations with political parties there regarding independence.

The council also affirmed that the situation resulting from the conflict to retain the colonies seriously disturbed international peace and security and requested that all states refrain from supplying Portugal with any arms or war materials that would enable her to continue to repress the people of the territories under its administration.

The resolution passed with seven votes, while France, the Netherlands, United Kingdom and United States abstained.

== See also ==
- List of United Nations Security Council Resolutions 201 to 300 (1965–1971)
- Portuguese Empire
