= United Nations Security Council Resolution 231 =

UN Security Council Resolution 231
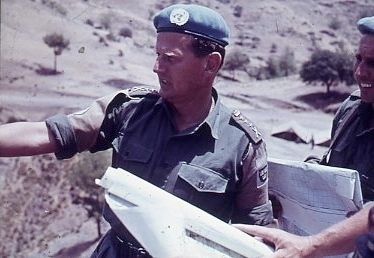
- Peacekeeping in Cyprus
- Date: December 15 1966
- Meeting no.: 1338
- Subject: The Cyprus Question
- Voting summary: 15 voted for; None voted against; None abstained
- Result: Adopted

Security Council composition
- Permanent members: China; France; Soviet Union; United Kingdom; United States
- Non-permanent members: Argentina; Bulgaria; Japan; Jordan; Mali; Netherlands; New Zealand; Nigeria; Uganda; Uruguay

United Nations Security Council Resolution 231 was adopted unanimously by the United Nations Security Council on December 15, 1966.

The Council extended the United Nations Peacekeeping Force in Cyprus for an additional 6 months, ending on June 26, 1967. The Council urged the involved parties to exercise maximum restraint and fully cooperate with the peacekeeping force.

== See also ==
- Cyprus dispute
- List of United Nations Security Council Resolutions 201 to 300 (1965–1971)
