= List of United Nations Security Council Resolutions 201 to 300 =

This is a list of United Nations Security Council Resolutions 201 to 300 adopted between 19 March 1965 and 12 October 1971.

Resolution	Date	Vote	Concerns
201	19 March 1965	11–0–0	Extending the mandate of the United Nations Peacekeeping Force in Cyprus
202	6 May 1965	7–0–4 (abstentions: France, USSR, United Kingdom, USA)	The Unilateral Declaration of Independence of Southern Rhodesia
203	14 May 1965	11–0–0	Calling for a ceasefire in the Dominican Civil War
204	19 May 1965	11–0–0	Portuguese Armed Forces in Senegalese territory
205	22 May 1965	10–0–1 (abstention: USA)	Calling for a ceasefire in the Dominican Republic
206	15 June 1965	11–0–0	Extending the mandate of the United Nations Peacekeeping Force in Cyprus
207	10 August 1965	11–0–0	Calling for cessation of acts in Cyprus
208	10 August 1965	Adopted without vote	Death of judge Abdel Hamid Badawi and elections to the International Court of Justice
209	4 September 1965	11–0–0	Deteriorating situation along ceasefire line in Kashmir
210	6 September 1965	11–0–0	Indo-Pakistani War of 1965
211	20 September 1965	10–0–1 (abstention: Jordan)	Demanding ceasefire between India and Pakistan
212	20 September 1965	11–0–0	Admission of Maldives
213	20 September 1965	11–0–0	Admission of Singapore
214	27 September 1965	Adopted without vote	Calling for ceasefire between India and Pakistan
215	5 November 1965	9–0–2 (abstentions: Jordan, USSR)	Meeting of representatives of India, Pakistan and Secretary-General
216	12 November 1965	10–0–1 (abstention: France)	Unilateral Declaration of Independence of Southern Rhodesia
217	20 November 1965	10–0–1 (abstention: France)	Calling on UK Government to act in Southern Rhodesia
218	23 November 1965	7–0–4 (abstentions: France, Netherlands, United Kingdom, USA)	Calling for an end to the Portuguese territories
219	17 December 1965	11–0–0 (last resolution adopted by 11 member states)	Extending the mandate of the United Nations Peacekeeping Force in Cyprus
220	16 March 1966	15–0–0 (first resolution adopted by 15 member states)	Extending the mandate of the United Nations Peacekeeping Force in Cyprus
221	9 April 1966	10–0–5 (abstentions: Bulgaria, France, Mali, USSR, Uruguay)	The Beira Patrol in Southern Rhodesia
222	16 June 1966	15–0–0	Extending the mandate of the United Nations Peacekeeping Force in Cyprus
223	21 June 1966	15–0–0	Admission of Guyana
224	14 October 1966	15–0–0	Admission of Botswana
225	14 October 1966	15–0–0	Admission of Lesotho
226	14 October 1966	15–0–0	Angolan-based foreign mercenary attacks in Democratic Republic of Congo
227	28 October 1966	15–0–0	Appointment of the Secretary-General U Thant
228	25 November 1966	14–0–1 (abstention: New Zealand)	Censures Israel attack on Jordan in violation of the United Nations Charter
229	2 December 1966	15–0–0	Appointment of the Secretary-General U Thant
230	7 December 1966	15–0–0	Admission of Barbados
231	15 December 1966	15–0–0	Extending the mandate of the United Nations Peacekeeping Force in Cyprus
232	16 December 1966	11–0–4 (abstentions: Bulgaria, France, Mali, USSR)	Sanctions against Southern Rhodesia
233	6 June 1967	15–0–0	Calls for Israel–Syria cease-fire
234	7 June 1967	15–0–0	Calls for Middle East cease-fire
235	9 June 1967	15–0–0	Asks Secretary-General to meet with Israel and Syria
236	11 June 1967	15–0–0	Condemns Israel–Syria cease-fire violation
237	14 June 1967	15–0–0	Calls on Israel to ensure safety of civilians and facilitate the return of refugees
238	19 June 1967	15–0–0	Extends peacekeeping operations in Cyprus
239	10 July 1967	15–0–0	Mercaneries attempting to destabilise Democratic Republic of Congo
240	25 October 1967	15–0–0	Condemns Middle East cease-fire violation
241	15 November 1967	15–0–0	Interference in the Democratic Republic of Congo
242	22 November 1967	15–0–0	Calls for the "Withdrawal of Israeli armed forces from territories occupied" during the Six-Day War
243	12 December 1967	15–0–0	Admission of Democratic Yemen
244	22 December 1967	15–0–0	Extends peacekeeping operations in Cyprus
245	25 January 1968	15–0–0	South Africa and detainees in South West Africa
246	14 March 1968	15–0–0	Deteriorating situation in South West Africa
247	18 March 1968	15–0–0	Extending mandate of the UN Peacekeeping Force in Cyprus
248	24 March 1968	15–0–0	Condemns Israeli attack on Karameh, Jordan
249	18 April 1968	15–0–0	Admission of Mauritius
250	27 April 1968	15–0–0	Condemns planned Israeli military parade in Jerusalem
251	2 May 1968	15–0–0	Condemns Israeli military parade
252	21 May 1968	13–0–2 (abstentions: Canada, USA)	Considers Israel's annexation of Jerusalem to be invalid
253	29 May 1968	15–0–0	Sanctions on Southern Rhodesia
254	18 June 1968	15–0–0	Extending UN Peacekeeping Force in Cyprus
255	19 June 1968	10–0–5 (abstentions: Algeria, Brazil, France, India, Pakistan)	Treaty on the Non-Proliferation of Nuclear Weapons
256	16 August 1968	15–0–0	Condemns Israel's attacks on Jordan.
257	11 September 1968	15–0–0	Admission of Swaziland
258	18 September 1968	14–0–1 (abstention: Algeria)	Condemns Israeli attack on Jordan
259	27 September 1968	12–0–3 (abstentions: Canada, Denmark, USA)	Deplores the delay in the implementation of resolution 237 (1967) because of the conditions still being set by Israel for receiving a Special Representative of the Secretary-General
260	6 November 1968	15–0–0	Admission of Equatorial Guinea
261	10 December 1968	15–0–0	Extends peacekeeping forces in Cyprus
262	31 December 1968	15–0–0	Condemns Israeli attack on the civil International Airport of Beirut, Lebanon.
263	24 January 1969	15–0–0	Adds Russian and Spanish to working languages of the Council
264	20 March 1969	13–0–2 (abstentions: France, United Kingdom)	Illegal presence of South Africa in Namibia
265	1 April 1969	11–0–4 (abstentions: Colombia, Paraguay, United Kingdom, USA)	Condemns the recent premeditated air attacks launched by Israel on Jordanian villages
266	10 June 1969	15–0–0	Extends peacekeeping operations in Cyprus
267	3 July 1969	15–0–0	Censures Israeli annexation of East Jerusalem
268	3 July 1969	11–0–4 (abstentions: France, Spain, United Kingdom, USA)	Portuguese attacks in Zambia
269	12 August 1969	11–0–4 (abstentions: Finland, France, United Kingdom, USA)	Continued South African presence in Namibia
270	26 August 1969	Adopted without vote	Condemns Israeli attack in southern Lebanon
271	15 September 1969	11–0–4 (abstentions: Colombia, Finland, Paraguay, USA)	Expresses grief over arson attack at the Jami Al-Aqsa
272	23 October 1969	15–0–0	Amendment to the Statute of the International Court of Justice
273	9 December 1969	13–0–2 (abstentions: Spain, USA)	Portuguese attacks in Senegal
274	11 December 1969	15–0–0	Extending peacekeeping operations Cyprus
275	22 December 1969	9–0–6 (abstentions: Republic of China, Colombia, France, Spain, United Kingdom, USA)	Portuguese attacks in Guinea from Guinea-Bissau
276	30 January 1970	13–0–2 (abstentions: France, United Kingdom)	Establishes ad hoc committee on South West Africa
277	15 March 1970	14–0–1 (abstention: Spain)	Deteriorating situation in Southern Rhodesia
278	11 May 1970	15–0–0	On the independence of Bahrain
279	12 May 1970	15–0–0	Demands the immediate withdrawal of all Israeli armed forces from Lebanese territory in response to the Israeli attack in which nine Lebanese were killed and 19 wounded.
280	19 May 1970	11–0–4 (abstentions: Colombia, Nicaragua, Sierra Leone, USA)	Condemns Israel for its premeditated military action with respect to Israeli–Lebanese conflict
281	9 June 1970	15–0–0	Extending peacekeeping operations in Cyprus
282	23 July 1970	12–0–3 (abstentions: France, United Kingdom, USA)	South African apartheid
283	29 July 1970	13–0–2 (abstentions: France, United Kingdom)	Discouraging investment in South African-occupied Namibia
284	29 July 1970	12–0–3 (abstentions: Poland, USSR, United Kingdom)	International Court of Justice opinion on Namibia
285	5 September 1970	14–0–1 (abstention: USA)	Demands the complete and immediate withdrawal of all Israeli armed forces from Lebanese territory
286	9 September 1970	Adopted without vote	Commercial aircraft hijacking in the aftermath of the Dawson's Field incident
287	10 October 1970	15–0–0	Admission of Fiji
288	17 November 1970	15–0–0	Calling on UK Government to end situation in Southern Rhodesia
289	23 November 1970	15–0–0	Portuguese invasion of Guinea
290	8 December 1970	11–0–4 (abstentions: France, Spain, United Kingdom, USA)	Condemns Portuguese Empire
291	10 December 1970	15–0–0	Extends peacekeeping operations in Cyprus
292	10 February 1971	15–0–0	Admission of Bhutan
293	26 May 1971	15–0–0	Extends peacekeeping operations in Cyprus
294	15 June 1971	13–0–2 (abstentions: United Kingdom, USA)	Portuguese violations of Senegalese territory
295	3 August 1971	15–0–0	Sending mission to Guinea
296	18 August 1971	15–0–0	Admission of Bahrain
297	15 September 1971	15–0–0	Admission of Qatar
298	25 September 1971	14–0–1 (abstention: Syria)	Deplores Israel's failure to respect UN resolutions against the annexation of Jerusalem
299	30 September 1971	15–0–0	Admission of Oman
300	12 October 1971	15–0–0	South African Border War in Zambia

== See also ==
- Lists of United Nations Security Council resolutions
- List of United Nations Security Council Resolutions 101 to 200
- List of United Nations Security Council Resolutions 301 to 400
