= United Nations Security Council Resolution 239 =

United Nations Security Council resolution

UN Security Council Resolution 239
- Location of the Democratic Republic of the Congo
- Date: July 10 1967
- Meeting no.: 1367
- Code: S/RES/239 (Document)
- Subject: Question concerning the Democratic Republic of Congo
- Voting summary: 15 voted for; None voted against; None abstained
- Result: Adopted

Security Council composition
- Permanent members: China; France; Soviet Union; United Kingdom; United States
- Non-permanent members: Argentina; Brazil; Bulgaria; Canada; Denmark; Ethiopia; India; Japan; Mali; Nigeria

United Nations Security Council Resolution 239, adopted unanimously on July 10, 1967, after reaffirming its concern over the issue and past condemnations, the Council again condemned any state which persisted in permitting or tolerating the recruitment of mercenaries or the provision of facilities to them, with the objective of overthrowing the governments of member states. The Council called upon governments to ensure that their territory and nationals were not being used for the planning of subversion, the recruitment, training or transit of mercenaries designed to overthrow the government of the Democratic Republic of the Congo.

== See also ==
- Congo Crisis
- List of United Nations Security Council Resolutions 201 to 300 (1965–1971)
