= United Nations Security Council Resolution 247 =

UN Security Council Resolution 247
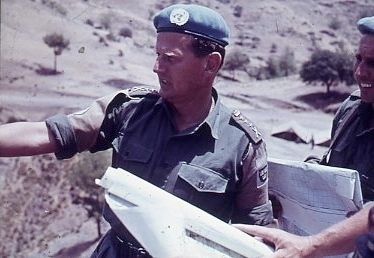
- Peacekeeping in Cyprus
- Date: March 18 1968
- Meeting no.: 1398
- Code: S/RES/247 (Document)
- Subject: The Question of the United Nations Peacekeeping Force in Cyprus
- Voting summary: 15 voted for; None voted against; None abstained
- Result: Adopted

Security Council composition
- Permanent members: China; France; Soviet Union; United Kingdom; United States
- Non-permanent members: Algeria; Brazil; Canada; Denmark; Ethiopia; Hungary; India; Pakistan; Paraguay; Senegal

United Nations Security Council Resolution 247, adopted unanimously on March 18, 1968, after reaffirming previous resolutions on the topic, the extension of the stationing in Cyprus of the United Nations Peacekeeping Force in Cyprus for an additional 3 months, now ending on June 26, 1968. The Council also called upon the parties directly concerned to continue to act with the utmost restraint and to co-operate fully with the peacekeeping force.

== See also ==
- Cyprus dispute
- List of United Nations Security Council Resolutions 201 to 300 (1965–1971)
