= United Nations Security Council Resolution 299 =

UN Security Council Resolution 299
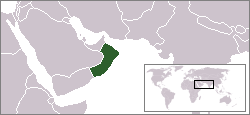
- Location of Oman
- Date: 30 September 1971
- Meeting no.: 1,587
- Code: S/RES/299 (Document)
- Subject: Admission of new Members to the UN: Oman
- Voting summary: 15 voted for; None voted against; None abstained
- Result: Adopted

Security Council composition
- Permanent members: China; France; Soviet Union; United Kingdom; United States
- Non-permanent members: Argentina; Belgium; Burundi; Italy; Japan; Nicaragua; Poland; Sierra Leone; Somalia; Syria

United Nations Security Council Resolution 299, adopted unanimously on September 30, 1971, after examining the application of Oman for membership in the United Nations, the Council recommended to the General Assembly that Oman be admitted.

== See also ==
- List of United Nations Security Council Resolutions 201 to 300 (1965–1971)
