= United Nations Security Council Resolution 227 =

UN Security Council Resolution 227
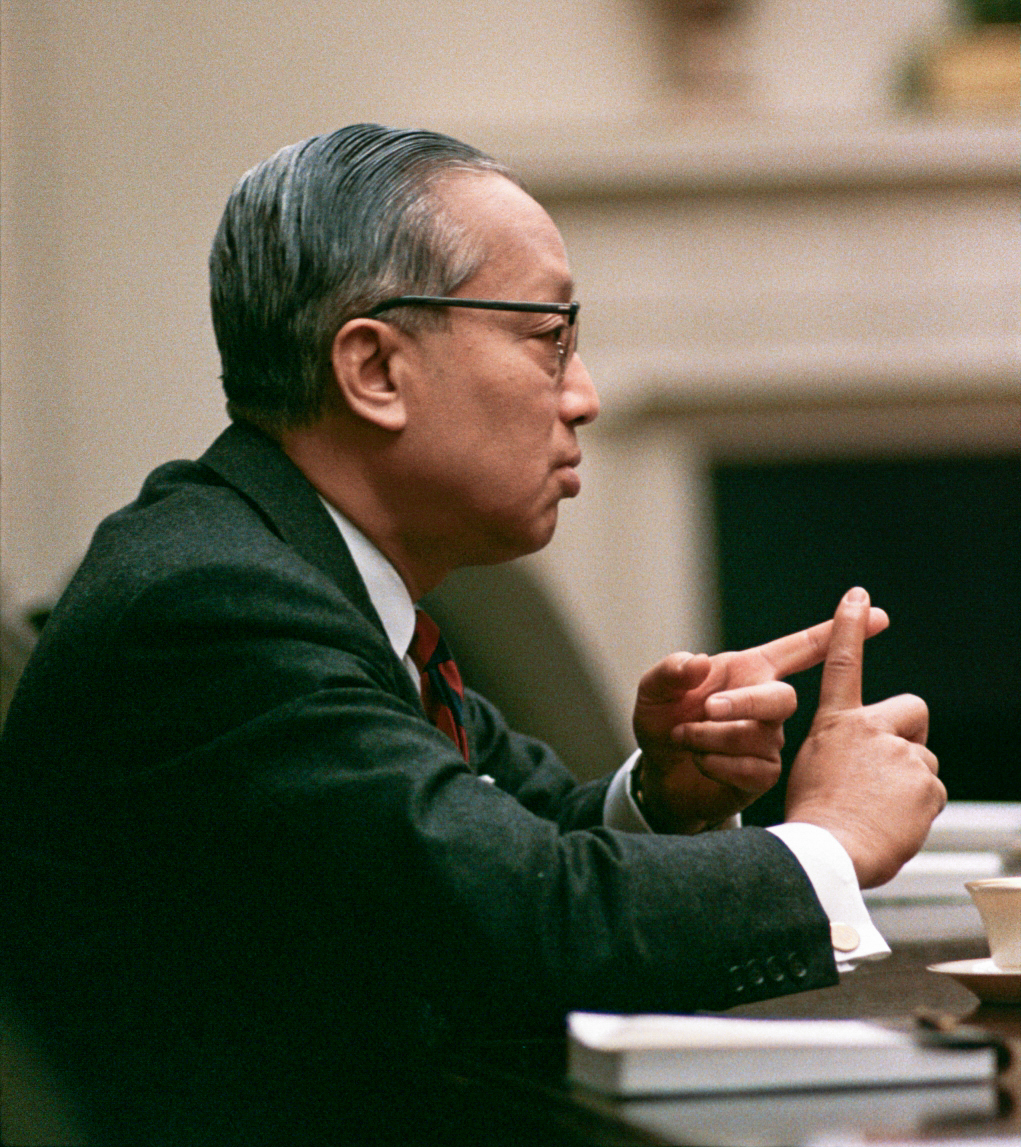
- U Thant
- Date: October 28 1966
- Meeting no.: 1311
- Subject: Recommendation regarding the appointment of the Secretary-General
- Result: Adopted

Security Council composition
- Permanent members: China; France; Soviet Union; United Kingdom; United States
- Non-permanent members: Argentina; Bulgaria; Japan; Jordan; Mali; Netherlands; New Zealand; Nigeria; Uganda; Uruguay

United Nations Security Council Resolution 227 was adopted by the United Nations Security Council on October 28, 1966 in a closed meeting. The Council recommended that the General Assembly extend the appointment of U Thant as Secretary-General until the end of the 21st regular session of the General Assembly.

== See also ==
- List of United Nations Security Council Resolutions 201 to 300 (1965–1971)
