= United Nations Security Council Resolution 277 =

UN Security Council Resolution 277
- Date: March 18 1970
- Meeting no.: 1,535
- Code: S/RES/277 (Document)
- Subject: Question concerning the situation in Southern Rhodesia
- Voting summary: 14 voted for; None voted against; 1 abstained
- Result: Adopted

Security Council composition
- Permanent members: China; France; Soviet Union; United Kingdom; United States
- Non-permanent members: Burundi; Colombia; Finland; Nepal; Poland; Spain; Syria; Zambia

United Nations Security Council Resolution 277, adopted on March 18, 1970, concerned the state of Southern Rhodesia, now known as Zimbabwe. The Council reaffirmed its previous resolutions and noted with grave concern that efforts thus far to bring the rebellion to the end had failed, some countries (Portugal and South Africa mentioned specifically) had not been obeying the Council's resolutions and that the situation in Southern Rhodesia continued to deteriorate as a result of the regime's new measures.

The Council also reaffirmed the United Kingdom's responsibility over the territory and demanded the immediate withdrawal of South African armed personnel from Southern Rhodesia. The Council finished by deciding that all member states shall immediately sever all diplomatic, consular, trade, military and other relations and terminate any representation that they maintained in the territory, immediately interrupt any existing means of transportation to and from Southern Rhodesia and that international and regional organizations suspend the illegal regime's membership.

The resolution was adopted near unanimously, while Spain abstained.

== See also ==
- List of United Nations Security Council Resolutions 201 to 300 (1965–1971)
- Unilateral Declaration of Independence (Rhodesia)
