= United Nations Security Council Resolution 241 =

United Nations Security Council resolution

UN Security Council Resolution 241
- Date: November 15 1967
- Meeting no.: 1378
- Code: S/RES/241 (Document)
- Subject: Question concerning the Democratic Republic of Congo
- Voting summary: 15 voted for; None voted against; None abstained
- Result: Adopted

Security Council composition
- Permanent members: China; France; Soviet Union; United Kingdom; United States
- Non-permanent members: Argentina; Brazil; Bulgaria; Canada; Denmark; Ethiopia; India; Japan; Mali; Nigeria

United Nations Security Council Resolution 241, adopted unanimously on November 15, 1967, after reaffirming past resolutions on the topic, the Council condemned any act of interference in the internal affairs of the Democratic Republic of the Congo, in particular the failure of Portugal to prevent mercenaries from using its colony in Angola as a base of operations for armed attacks against the DR Congo. The Council called upon Portugal to put and immediate end to this and called upon all countries receiving mercenaries who had participated in the attacks against the DR Congo to take appropriate measures to prevent them from renewing their activities against any state.

== See also ==
- Congo Crisis
- List of United Nations Security Council Resolutions 201 to 300 (1965–1971)
- Portuguese Empire
