= United Nations Security Council Resolution 297 =

UN Security Council Resolution 297
- Date: September 15 1971
- Meeting no.: 1,578
- Code: S/RES/297 (Document)
- Subject: Admission of new Members to the UN: Qatar
- Voting summary: 15 voted for; None voted against; None abstained
- Result: Adopted

Security Council composition
- Permanent members: China; France; Soviet Union; United Kingdom; United States
- Non-permanent members: Argentina; Belgium; Burundi; Italy; Japan; Nicaragua; Poland; Sierra Leone; Somalia; Syria

United Nations Security Council Resolution 297, adopted unanimously on September 15, 1971, after examining the application of Qatar for membership in the United Nations, the Council recommended to the General Assembly that Qatar be admitted.

== See also ==
- List of United Nations Security Council Resolutions 201 to 300 (1965–1971)
