= United Nations Security Council Resolution 257 =

UN Security Council Resolution 257
- Date: September 11, 1968
- Meeting no.: 1450
- Code: S/RES/257 (Document)
- Subject: Admission of new Members to the UN: Swaziland
- Voting summary: 15 voted for; None voted against; None abstained
- Result: Adopted

Security Council composition
- Permanent members: China; France; Soviet Union; United Kingdom; United States
- Non-permanent members: Algeria; Brazil; Canada; Denmark; Ethiopia; Hungary; India; Pakistan; Paraguay; Senegal

United Nations Security Council Resolution 257, adopted unanimously on September 11, 1968, after examining the application of Swaziland for membership in the United Nations, the Council recommended to the General Assembly that Swaziland be admitted.

== See also ==
- List of United Nations Security Council Resolutions 201 to 300 (1965–1971)
