= United Nations Security Council Resolution 287 =

UN Security Council Resolution 287
- Date: October 10 1970
- Meeting no.: 1,554
- Code: S/RES/287 (Document)
- Subject: Admission of new Members to the UN: Fiji
- Voting summary: 15 voted for; None voted against; None abstained
- Result: Adopted

Security Council composition
- Permanent members: China; France; Soviet Union; United Kingdom; United States
- Non-permanent members: Burundi; Colombia; Finland; Nepal; Poland; Spain; Syria; Zambia

United Nations Security Council Resolution 287, adopted unanimously on October 10, 1970, after examining the application of Fiji for membership in the United Nations, the Council recommended to the General Assembly that Fiji be admitted.

== See also ==
- List of United Nations Security Council Resolutions 201 to 300 (1965–1971)
