= United Nations Security Council Resolution 245 =

UN Security Council Resolution 245
- Location of South Africa
- Date: January 25 1968
- Meeting no.: 1387
- Code: S/RES/245 (Document)
- Subject: The Question of South West Africa
- Voting summary: 15 voted for; None voted against; None abstained
- Result: Adopted

Security Council composition
- Permanent members: China; France; Soviet Union; United Kingdom; United States
- Non-permanent members: Algeria; Brazil; Canada; Denmark; Ethiopia; Hungary; India; Pakistan; Paraguay; Senegal

United Nations Security Council Resolution 245, adopted on January 25, 1968, after the government of the Republic of South Africa refused to comply with a General Assembly resolution 2324 and continued to illegally try detainees from South West Africa, the Council demanded that those prisoners be released and repatriated and invited all states to exert their influence in order to induce the South Africans government to comply with the resolution.

The resolution was adopted unanimously.

== See also ==
- History of Namibia
- List of United Nations Security Council Resolutions 201 to 300 (1965–1971)
