= United Nations Security Council Resolution 223 =

UN Security Council Resolution 223
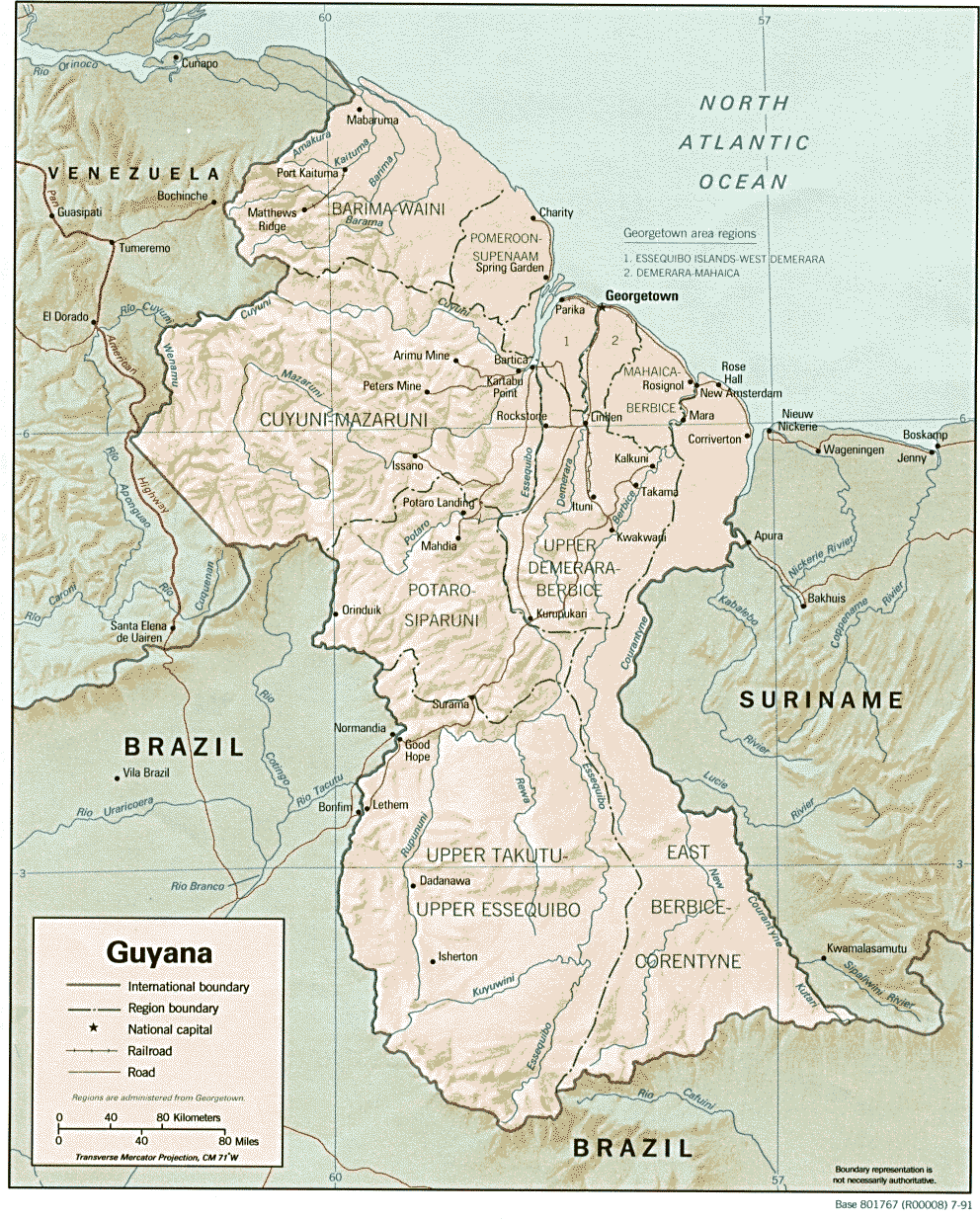
- Location of Guyana
- Date: June 21 1966
- Meeting no.: 1287
- Subject: Admission of new Members to the UN: Guyana
- Voting summary: 15 voted for; None voted against; None abstained
- Result: Adopted

Security Council composition
- Permanent members: China; France; Soviet Union; United Kingdom; United States
- Non-permanent members: Argentina; Bulgaria; Japan; Jordan; Mali; Netherlands; New Zealand; Nigeria; Uganda; Uruguay

United Nations Security Council Resolution 223 was adopted unanimously by the United Nations Security Council on June 21, 1966. The Council recommended that the General Assembly admit Guyana as a member state.

A representative from Venezuela was also present at the meeting but could not vote.

== See also ==
- List of United Nations Security Council Resolutions 201 to 300 (1965–1971)
