= United Nations Security Council Resolution 260 =

UN Security Council Resolution 260
- Date: November 6 1968
- Meeting no.: 1458
- Code: S/RES/260 (Document)
- Subject: Admission of new Members to the UN: Equatorial Guinea
- Voting summary: 15 voted for; None voted against; None abstained
- Result: Adopted

Security Council composition
- Permanent members: China; France; Soviet Union; United Kingdom; United States
- Non-permanent members: Algeria; Brazil; Canada; Denmark; Ethiopia; Hungary; India; Pakistan; Paraguay; Senegal

United Nations Security Council Resolution 260, adopted unanimously on November 6, 1968, after examining the application of the Republic of Equatorial Guinea for membership in the United Nations, the Council recommended to the General Assembly that the Republic of Equatorial Guinea be admitted.

== See also ==
- List of United Nations Security Council Resolutions 201 to 300 (1965–1971)
