= United Nations Security Council Resolution 202 =

UN Security Council Resolution 202
- Date: May 6 1965
- Meeting no.: 1202
- Subject: Question concerning the Situation in Southern Rhodesia
- Voting summary: 7 voted for; None voted against; 4 abstained
- Result: Adopted

Security Council composition
- Permanent members: China; France; Soviet Union; United Kingdom; United States
- Non-permanent members: Bolivia; Ivory Coast; Jordan; Malaysia; Netherlands; Uruguay

United Nations Security Council Resolution 202, adopted on May 6, 1965, after reaffirming motions from the General Assembly, the Council requested that no member state accept a Unilateral Declaration of Independence from Southern Rhodesia and that the United Kingdom take all measures necessary to prevent it. The resolution also called on all political prisoners to be released and for the freedom of political parties to operate. The Council requested that the UK work toward and equitable constitution and for the future independence of a majority-ruled Southern Rhodesia.

The resolution was adopted with seven votes to none; France, the Soviet Union, United Kingdom and United States abstained from voting.

== See also ==
- List of United Nations Security Council Resolutions 201 to 300 (1965–1971)
- Rhodesia's Unilateral Declaration of Independence
