= United Nations Security Council Resolution 235 =

United Nations Security Council resolution

UN Security Council Resolution 235
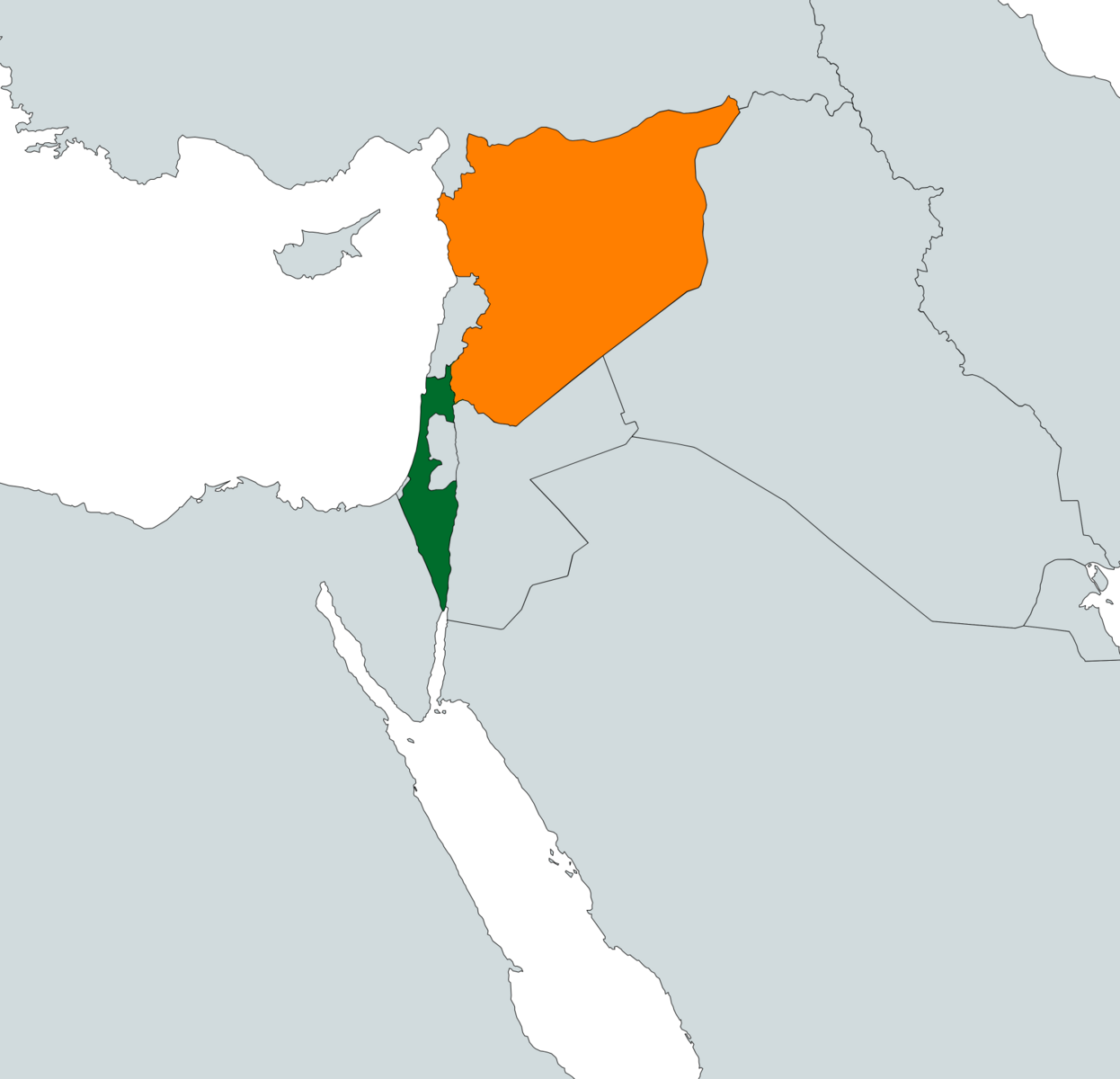
- Map highlighting Israel (green) and Syria (orange)
- Date: June 9 1967
- Meeting no.: 1352
- Subject: The situation in the Middle East
- Voting summary: 15 voted for; None voted against; None abstained
- Result: Adopted

Security Council composition
- Permanent members: China; France; Soviet Union; United Kingdom; United States
- Non-permanent members: Argentina; Brazil; Bulgaria; Canada; Denmark; Ethiopia; India; Japan; Mali; Nigeria

United Nations Security Council Resolution 235, adopted on June 9, 1967, after noting that the governments of both Israel and Syria have accepted the Council's demand for a cease-fire, the Council demanded that hostilities should cease forthwith and requested that the Secretary-General make immediate contacts with the Governments of Israel and Syria to immediately arrange compliance with the cease-fire and to report to the Security Council within 2 hours of the resolution.

The meeting, requested by the Soviet Union and United States, adopted the resolution unanimously. The same day, Syria and Israel accepted the terms of the resolution.

== See also ==
- List of United Nations Security Council Resolutions 201 to 300 (1965–1971)
- Six-Day War
