= United Nations Security Council Resolution 296 =

UN Security Council Resolution 296
- Date: August 18 1971
- Meeting no.: 1,575
- Code: S/RES/296 (Document)
- Subject: Admission of new Members to the UN: Bahrain
- Voting summary: 15 voted for; None voted against; None abstained
- Result: Adopted

Security Council composition
- Permanent members: China; France; Soviet Union; United Kingdom; United States
- Non-permanent members: Argentina; Belgium; Burundi; Italy; Japan; Nicaragua; Poland; Sierra Leone; Somalia; Syria

United Nations Security Council Resolution 296, adopted unanimously on August 18, 1971, after examining the application of Bahrain for membership in the United Nations, the Council recommended to the General Assembly that Bahrain be admitted.

== See also ==
- List of United Nations Security Council Resolutions 201 to 300 (1965–1971)
