= United Nations Security Council Resolution 246 =

UN Security Council Resolution 246
- Date: March 14 1968
- Meeting no.: 1387
- Code: S/RES/246 (Document)
- Subject: The Question of South West Africa
- Voting summary: 15 voted for; None voted against; None abstained
- Result: Adopted

Security Council composition
- Permanent members: China; France; Soviet Union; United Kingdom; United States
- Non-permanent members: Algeria; Brazil; Canada; Denmark; Ethiopia; Hungary; India; Pakistan; Paraguay; Senegal

United Nations Security Council Resolution 246, adopted unanimously on March 14, 1968, after reaffirming previous resolution of the topic of the independence of South West Africa and the rights of its people, the Council censured the government of South Africa and demanded they release and repatriate the South West African prisoners in their custody. The Council also decided that if South Africa failed to comply with the previous and present resolutions the Council would meet immediately to determine effective steps or measures in conformity with the relevant provisions of the Charter of the United Nations.

== See also ==
- History of Namibia
- List of United Nations Security Council Resolutions 201 to 300 (1965–1971)
