= United Nations Security Council Resolution 233 =

United Nations Security Council resolution

UN Security Council Resolution 233
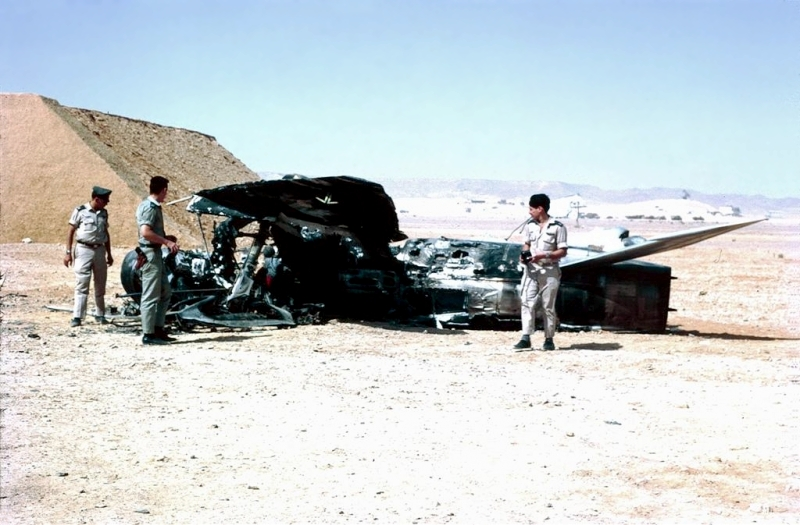
- Israeli troops examine destroyed Arab aircraft
- Date: June 6 1967
- Meeting no.: 1348
- Subject: The situation in the Middle East
- Voting summary: 15 voted for; None voted against; None abstained
- Result: Adopted

Security Council composition
- Permanent members: China; France; Soviet Union; United Kingdom; United States
- Non-permanent members: Argentina; Brazil; Bulgaria; Canada; Denmark; Ethiopia; India; Japan; Mali; Nigeria

United Nations Security Council Resolution 233 was unanimously adopted by the United Nations Security Council on June 6, 1967, after an oral report by the Secretary-General regarding the outbreak of fighting and the situation in the Near East. The Council called for an immediate cessation of all military activities in the area and requested that the Secretary-General keep the Council promptly and currently informed on the situation.

== See also ==
- List of United Nations Security Council Resolutions 201 to 300 (1965–1971)
- Six-Day War
