= United Nations Security Council Resolution 288 =

UN Security Council Resolution 288
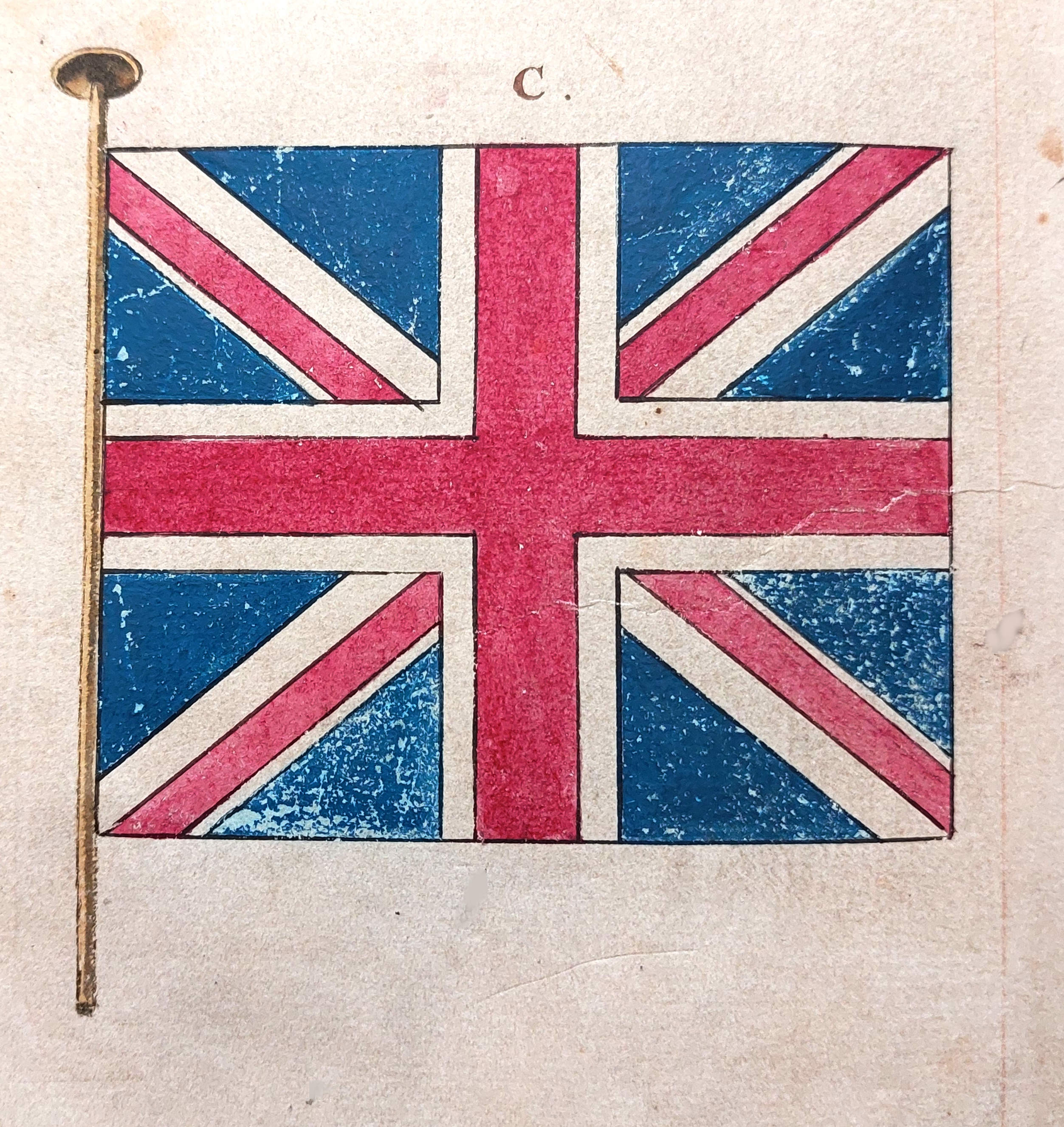
- UK flag
- Date: November 17 1970
- Meeting no.: 1,557
- Code: S/RES/288 (Document)
- Subject: Question concerning the situation in Southern Rhodesia
- Voting summary: 15 voted for; None voted against; None abstained
- Result: Adopted

Security Council composition
- Permanent members: China; France; Soviet Union; United Kingdom; United States
- Non-permanent members: Burundi; Colombia; Finland; Nepal; Poland; Spain; Syria; Zambia

United Nations Security Council Resolution 288, adopted unanimously on November 17, 1970, after reaffirming previous resolutions on the topic, the Council called upon the United Kingdom, as the legal administering Power of Southern Rhodesia, to bring an end to the illegal rebellion. The Council decided that the present sanctions against Rhodesia would remain in place and urged all states to implement all pertinent resolutions and not to grant any form of recognition to the regime.

== See also ==
- List of United Nations Security Council Resolutions 201 to 300 (1965–1971)
