= United Nations Security Council Resolution 265 =

UN Security Council Resolution 265
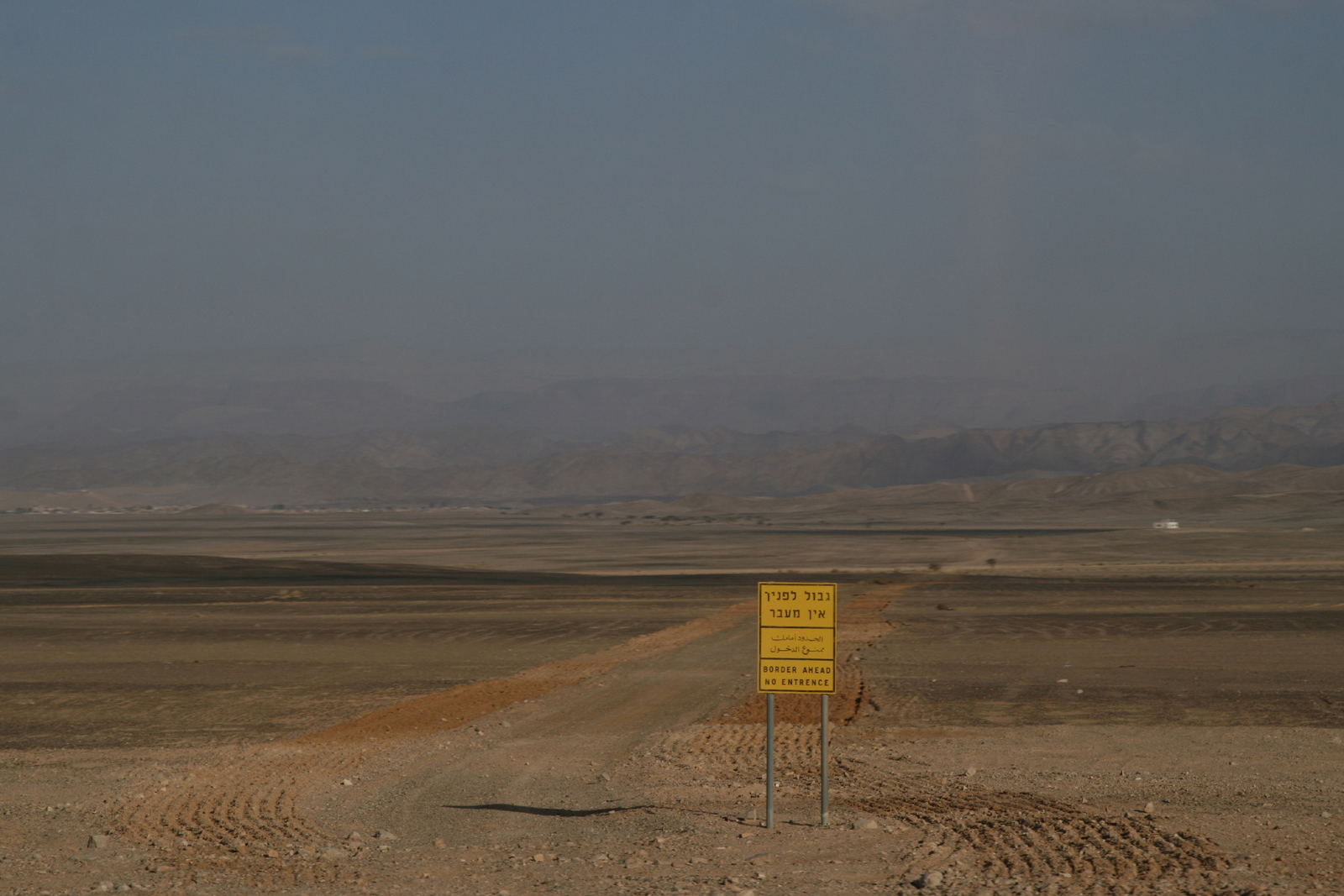
- Israel-Jordan border
- Date: April 1 1969
- Meeting no.: 1,473
- Code: S/RES/265 (Document)
- Subject: The Situation in the Middle East
- Voting summary: 11 voted for; None voted against; 4 abstained
- Result: Adopted

Security Council composition
- Permanent members: China; France; Soviet Union; United Kingdom; United States
- Non-permanent members: Algeria; Colombia; Finland; Hungary; Nepal; Pakistan; Paraguay; Senegal; Spain; Zambia

United Nations Security Council Resolution 265, adopted on April 1, 1969, after reaffirming resolution 248, the Council condemned Israel's for its premeditated air attacks on Jordan villages in flagrant violation of the United Nations Charter and cease-fire resolutions and deplored the loss of civilian life and damage to property.

The resolution was adopted by 11 votes to none; Colombia, Paraguay, the United Kingdom and United States abstained from voting.

== See also ==
- Arab–Israeli conflict
- List of United Nations Security Council Resolutions 201 to 300 (1965–1971)
