= United Nations Security Council Resolution 281 =

UN Security Council Resolution 281
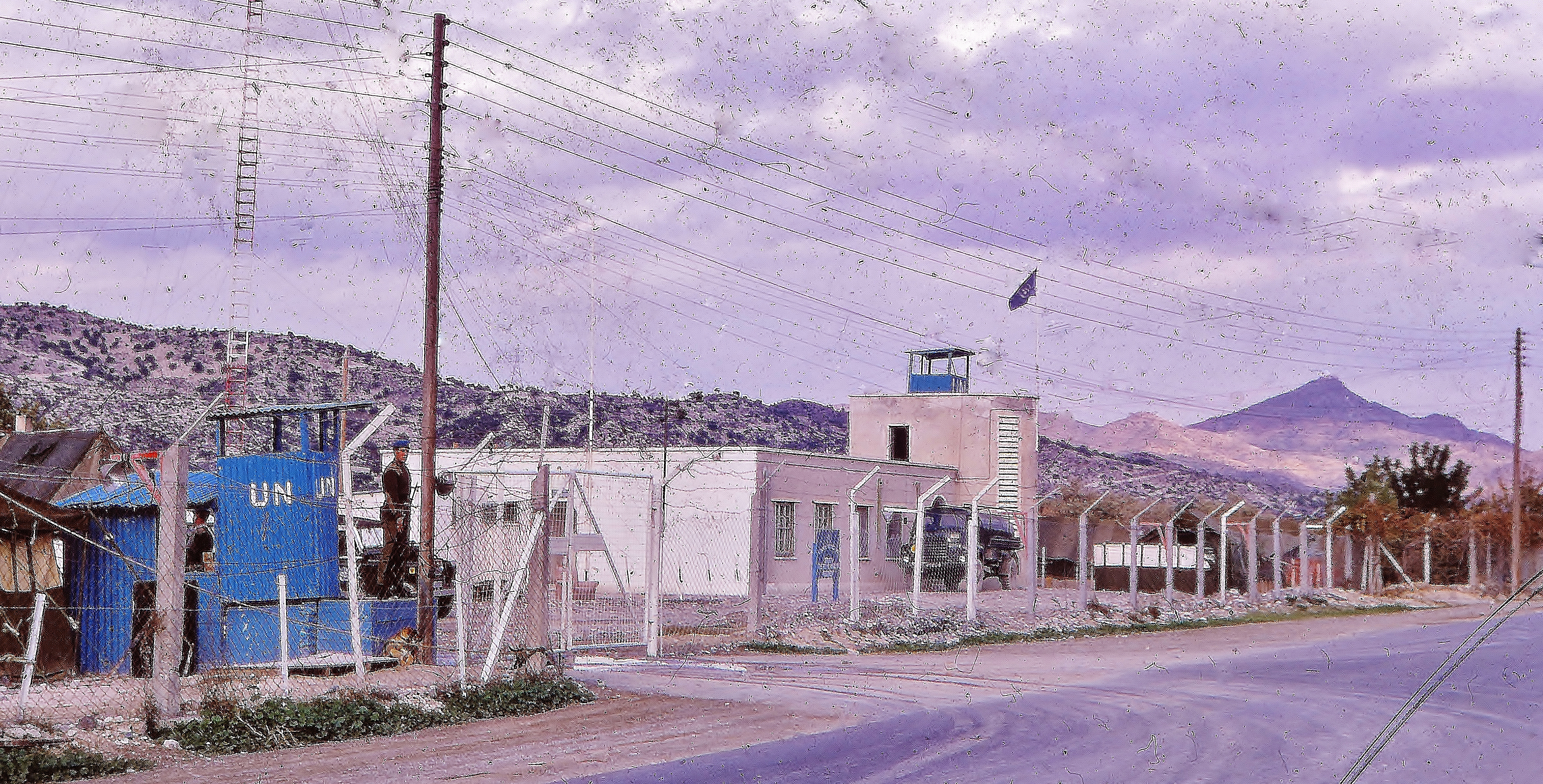
- UN base in Cyprus
- Date: June 9 1970
- Meeting no.: 1,543
- Code: S/RES/281 (Document)
- Subject: The Cyprus Question
- Voting summary: 15 voted for; None voted against; None abstained
- Result: Adopted

Security Council composition
- Permanent members: China; France; Soviet Union; United Kingdom; United States
- Non-permanent members: Burundi; Colombia; Finland; Nepal; Poland; Spain; Syria; Zambia

United Nations Security Council Resolution 281, adopted unanimously on June 9, 1970, after reaffirming previous resolutions on the topic, and noting recent encouraging developments, the Council extended the stationing in Cyprus of the United Nations Peacekeeping Force in Cyprus for a further period, now ending on December 15, 1970. The council also called upon the parties directly concerned to continue to act with the utmost restraint and to co-operate fully with the peacekeeping force.

== See also ==
- Cyprus dispute
- List of United Nations Security Council Resolutions 201 to 300 (1965–1971)
