= United Nations Security Council Resolution 292 =

United Nations Security Council resolution

UN Security Council Resolution 292
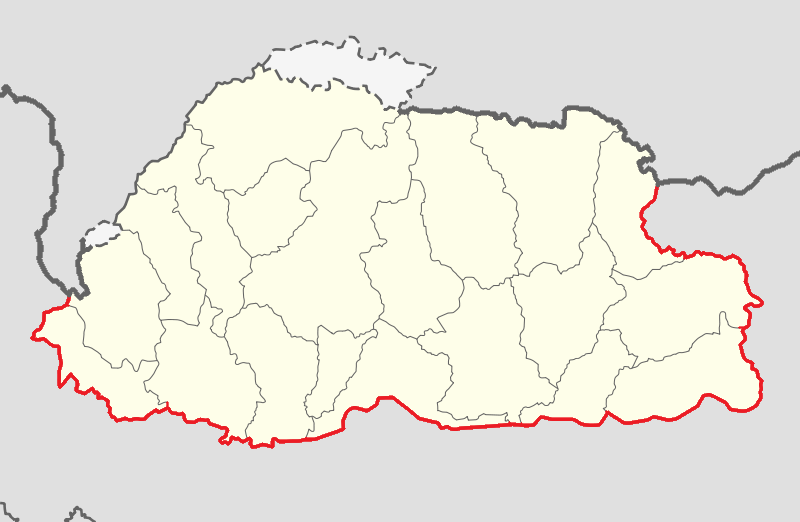
- Map of Bhutan
- Date: February 10 1971
- Meeting no.: 1,566
- Code: S/RES/292 (Document)
- Subject: Admission of new Members to the UN: Bhutan
- Voting summary: 15 voted for; None voted against; None abstained
- Result: Adopted

Security Council composition
- Permanent members: China; France; Soviet Union; United Kingdom; United States
- Non-permanent members: Argentina; Belgium; Burundi; Italy; Japan; Nicaragua; Poland; Sierra Leone; Somalia; Syria

United Nations Security Council Resolution 292, adopted unanimously on February 10, 1971, after examining the application of Bhutan for membership in the United Nations, the Council recommended to the General Assembly that Bhutan be admitted.

== See also ==
- List of United Nations Security Council Resolutions 201 to 300 (1965–1971)
