= United Nations Security Council Resolution 268 =

UN Security Council Resolution 268
- Date: July 28 1969
- Meeting no.: 1,491
- Code: S/RES/268 (Document)
- Subject: Complaint by Zambia
- Voting summary: 11 voted for; None voted against; 4 abstained
- Result: Adopted

Security Council composition
- Permanent members: China; France; Soviet Union; United Kingdom; United States
- Non-permanent members: Algeria; Colombia; Finland; Hungary; Nepal; Pakistan; Paraguay; Senegal; Spain; Zambia

United Nations Security Council Resolution 268, adopted on July 28, 1969, after hearing statements by the parties involved, the Council strongly censured Portugal for attacks on in Katete in eastern Zambia. The Council called upon Portugal to desist from violating the territorial integrity of and carrying out unprovoked raids against Zambia. The Council demanded the Portuguese military return all civilians kidnapped and all property taken declaring that if Portugal failed to comply they would meet to consider further measures.

Resolution 268 was adopted by 11 votes to none, while France, Spain, the United Kingdom and United States abstained.

== See also ==
- List of United Nations Security Council Resolutions 201 to 300 (1965–1971)
