= United Nations Security Council Resolution 220 =

UN Security Council Resolution 220
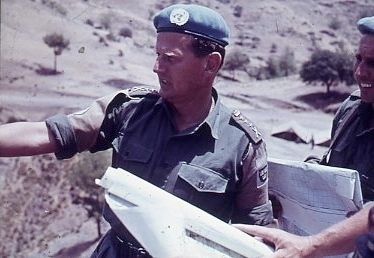
- Peacekeeping in Cyprus
- Date: March 16 1966
- Meeting no.: 1275
- Subject: The Cyprus Question
- Voting summary: 15 voted for; None voted against; None abstained
- Result: Adopted

Security Council composition
- Permanent members: China; France; Soviet Union; United Kingdom; United States
- Non-permanent members: Argentina; Bulgaria; Japan; Jordan; Mali; Netherlands; New Zealand; Nigeria; Uganda; Uruguay

United Nations Security Council Resolution 220, adopted unanimously on March 16, 1966, after reaffirming previous resolutions on the topic, the Council extended the stationing in Cyprus of the United Nations Peacekeeping Force in Cyprus for an additional 3 months, now ending on June 26, 1966. The Council also called upon the parties directly concerned to continue to act with the utmost restraint and to co-operate fully with the peacekeeping force.

Resolution 220 was the first to be passed with the newly expanded Security Council of 15 members.

== See also ==
- Cyprus dispute
- List of United Nations Security Council Resolutions 201 to 300 (1965–1971)
