= United Nations Security Council Resolution 294 =

UN Security Council Resolution 294
- Date: July 15 1971
- Meeting no.: 1,572
- Code: S/RES/294 (Document)
- Subject: Complaint by Senegal
- Voting summary: 13 voted for; None voted against; 2 abstained
- Result: Adopted

Security Council composition
- Permanent members: China; France; Soviet Union; United Kingdom; United States
- Non-permanent members: Argentina; Belgium; Burundi; Italy; Japan; Nicaragua; Poland; Sierra Leone; Somalia; Syria

United Nations Security Council Resolution 294, adopted on July 15, 1971, disturbed by the longstanding Portuguese violations of Senegalese territory and the recent laying of mines inside that nation which was giving shelter to independentist guerrillas of PAIGC, during the Portuguese Colonial War. The Council noted Portugal's failure to comply with previous resolutions and demanded that they immediately cease all acts of violence and destruction in Senegal and respect her territorial integrity. The Council included the usual condemnations and requested that the Secretary-General urgently send a special mission of members of the Council assisted by their military experts to carry out an inquiry into the facts of the situation and make recommendations.

The resolution was adopted with 13 votes to none; the United Kingdom and United States abstained.

== See also ==
- Guinea-Bissau War of Independence
- List of United Nations Security Council Resolutions 201 to 300 (1965–1971)
- Portuguese Empire
