= United Nations Security Council Resolution 203 =

UN Security Council Resolution 203
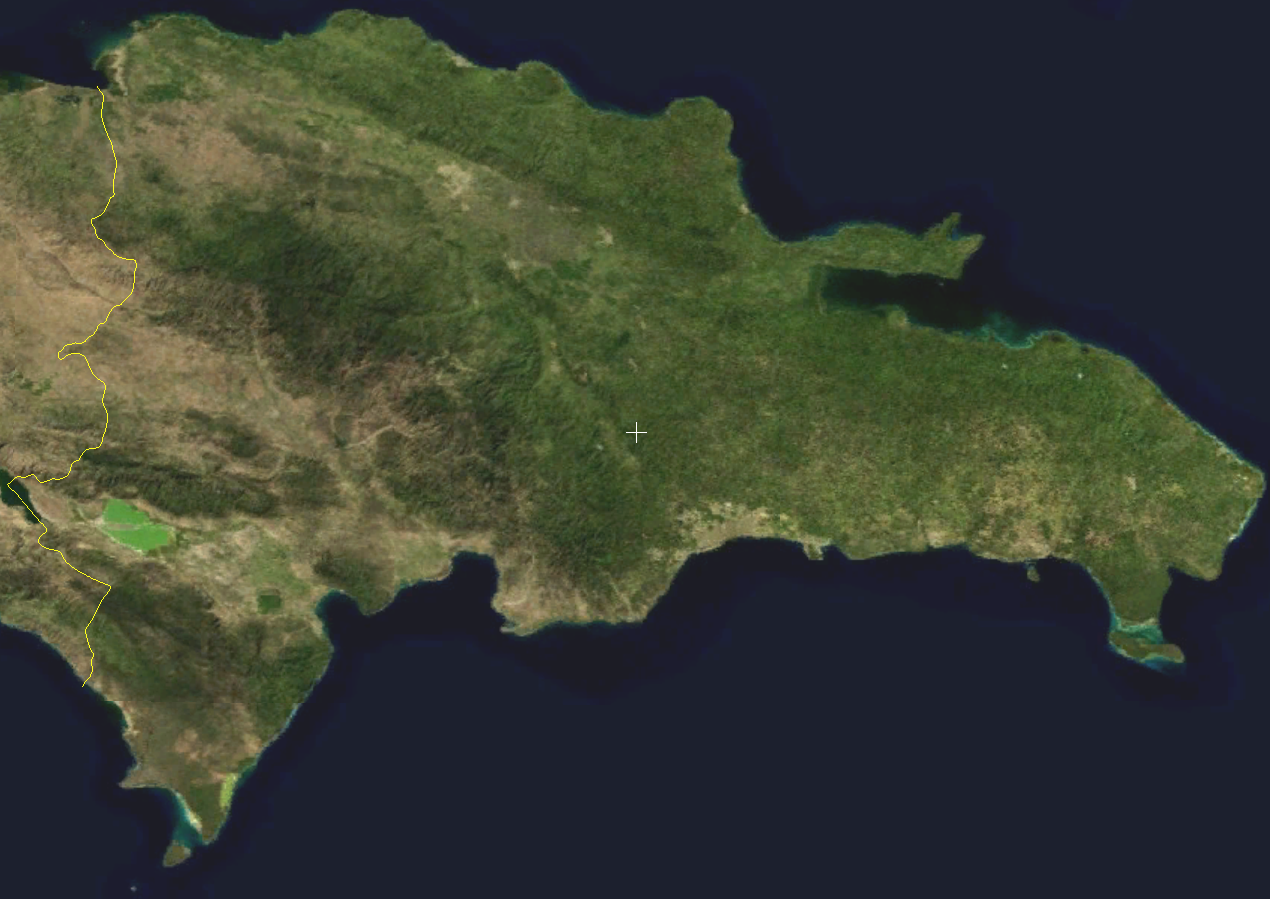
- Map of the Dominican Republic
- Date: May 14 1965
- Meeting no.: 1208
- Subject: The situation in the Dominican Republic
- Voting summary: 11 voted for; None voted against; None abstained
- Result: Adopted

Security Council composition
- Permanent members: China; France; Soviet Union; United Kingdom; United States
- Non-permanent members: Bolivia; Ivory Coast; Jordan; Malaysia; Netherlands; Uruguay

United Nations Security Council Resolution 203, adopted on May 14, 1965, addressed the escalating instability, an emerging civil war and the probability of foreign intervention in the Dominican Republic. The Council called for a strict cease-fire and requested the Secretary-General to dispatch a representative to the Dominican Republic to report on the situation to the council.

The resolution was passed unanimously.

== See also ==
- Dominican Civil War
- List of United Nations Security Council Resolutions 201 to 300 (1965–1971)
- Operation Power Pack
