= United Nations Security Council Resolution 279 =

UN Security Council Resolution 279
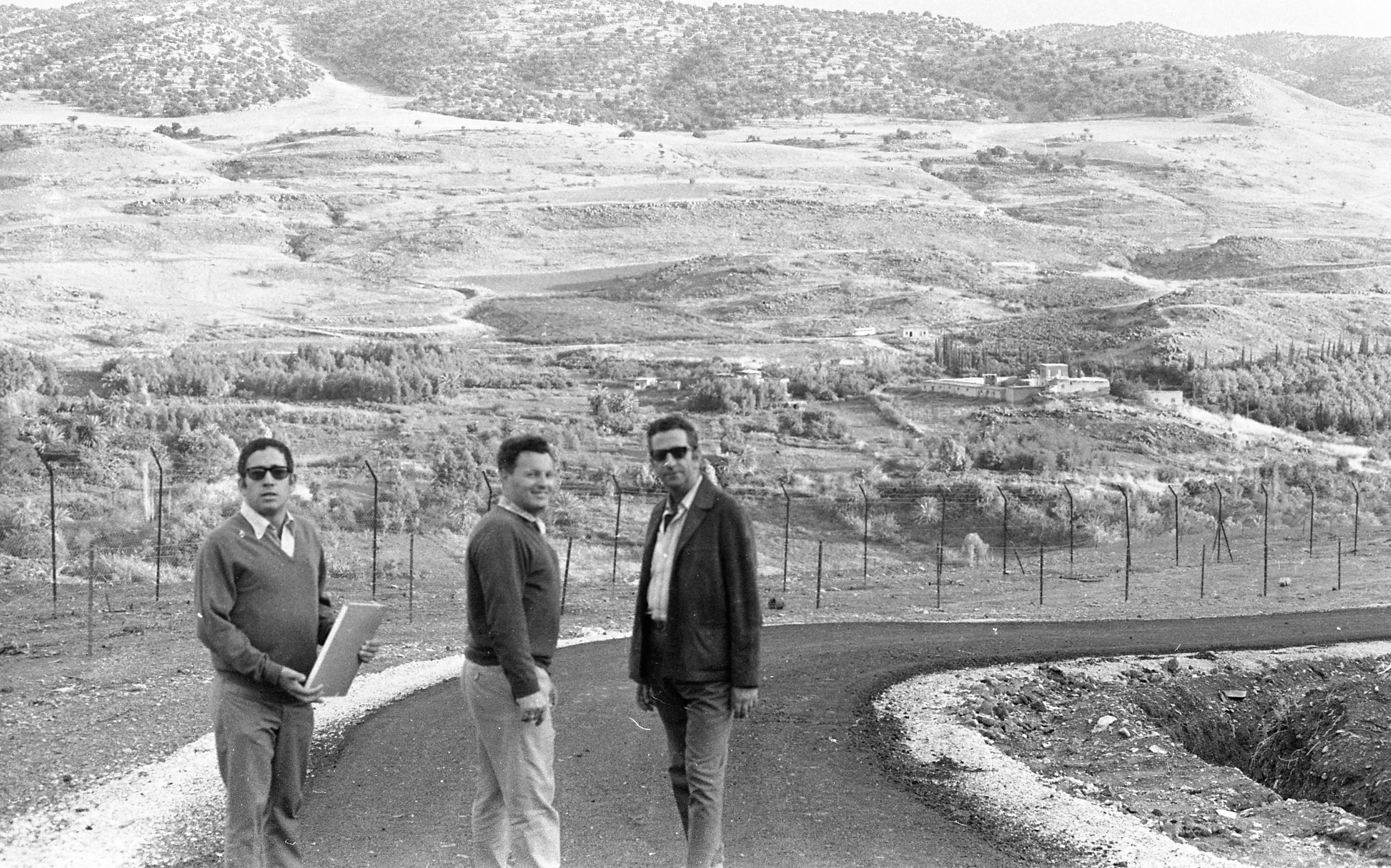
- Lebanese border
- Date: May 12 1970
- Meeting no.: 1,537
- Code: S/RES/279 (Document)
- Subject: The Situation in the Middle East
- Voting summary: 15 voted for; None voted against; None abstained
- Result: Adopted

Security Council composition
- Permanent members: China; France; Soviet Union; United Kingdom; United States
- Non-permanent members: Burundi; Colombia; Finland; Nepal; Poland; Spain; Syria; Zambia

United Nations Security Council Resolution 279, adopted unanimously on May 12, 1970, at 15 words is the second shortest Security Council resolution ever adopted; it reads simply "The Security Council Demands the immediate withdrawal of all Israeli armed forces from Lebanese territory." The resolution came in the context of Palestinian insurgency in South Lebanon.

== See also ==
- List of United Nations Security Council Resolutions 201 to 300 (1965–1971)
