= United Nations Security Council Resolution 234 =

United Nations Security Council resolution

UN Security Council Resolution 234
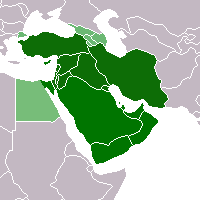
- Map of the Near East region
- Date: June 7 1967
- Meeting no.: 1350
- Subject: The situation in the Middle East
- Voting summary: 15 voted for; None voted against; None abstained
- Result: Adopted

Security Council composition
- Permanent members: China; France; Soviet Union; United Kingdom; United States
- Non-permanent members: Argentina; Brazil; Bulgaria; Canada; Denmark; Ethiopia; India; Japan; Mali; Nigeria

United Nations Security Council Resolution 234 was adopted unanimously by the United Nations Security Council on June 7, 1967. The Council demanded the immediate discontinuation of all military activity in the Near East by 20:00 GMT on June 7, 1967.

The meeting was called by the Soviet Union. Jordan, Israel, the United Arab Republic also accepted the ceasefire solution, on the condition of reciprocity.

== See also ==
- List of United Nations Security Council Resolutions 201 to 300 (1965–1971)
- Six-Day War
