= List of United Nations resolutions concerning Israel =

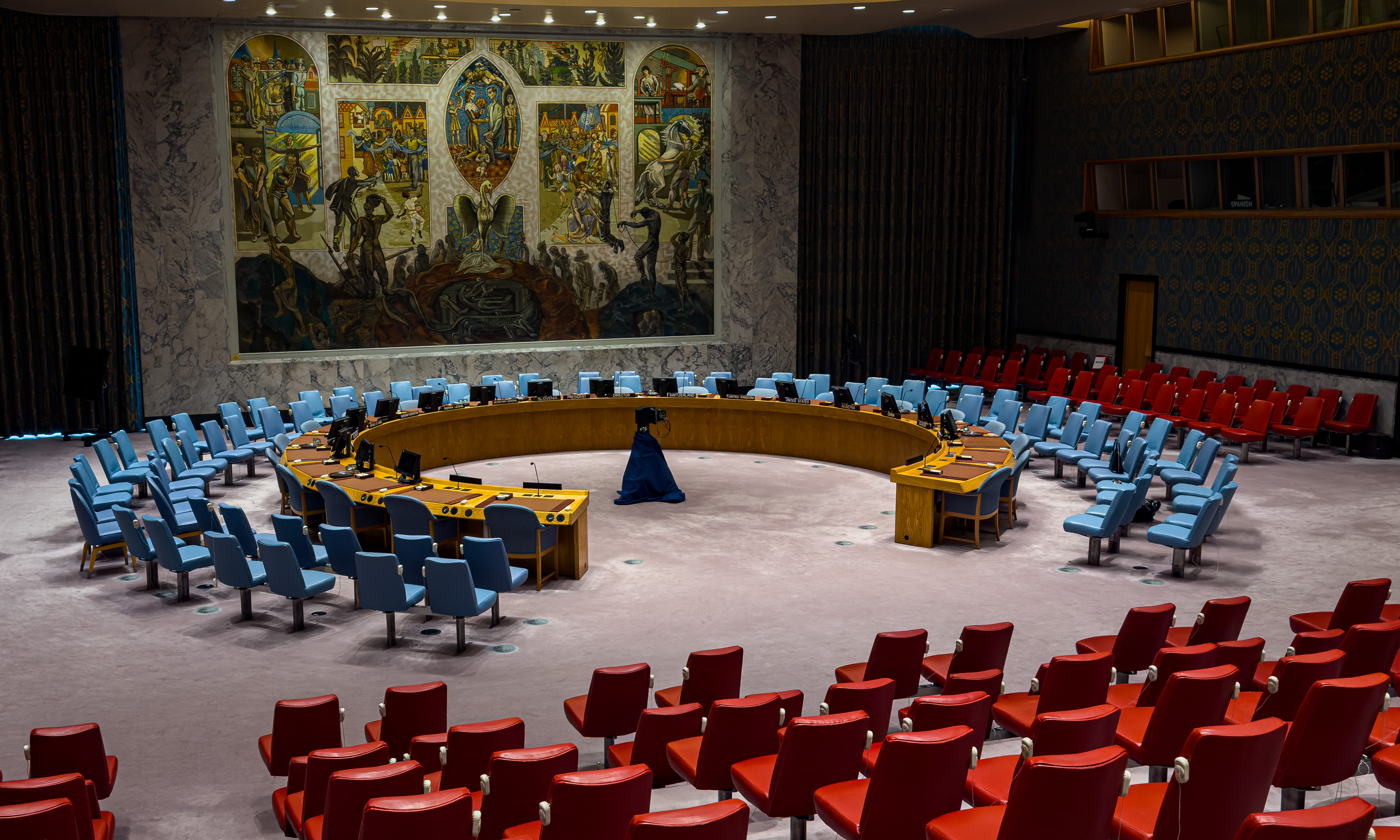
UN Security Council Chamber in New York City, United States

As of 2013, the State of Israel had been condemned in 45 resolutions by the United Nations Human Rights Council (UNHRC).

From 1967 to 1989, the United Nations Security Council (UNSC) adopted 131 Security Council resolutions directly addressing the Arab–Israeli conflict. In early UNSC practice, resolutions did not directly invoke Chapter VII of the United Nations Charter. They made an explicit determination of a threat, breach of the peace, or act of aggression, and ordered an action in accordance with Article 39 or 40. UNSC Resolution 54 determined that a threat to peace existed within the meaning of Article 39 of the Charter, reiterated the need for a truce, and ordered a ceasefire pursuant to Article 40 of the Charter. Although the phrase "Acting under Chapter VII" was never mentioned as the basis for the action taken, the chapter's authority was being used.

The United Nations General Assembly (UNGA) has adopted a number of resolutions stating that Israel's strategic relationship with the United States, a superpower and permanent member of the Security Council with veto power, encourages the former to pursue aggressive and expansionist policies and practices in the Israeli–Palestinian conflict. The 9th Emergency Session of the UNGA was convened at the request of the UNSC when the United States blocked all efforts to adopt sanctions against Israel. The United States responded to the frequent criticism from United Nations organs by adopting the Negroponte doctrine of opposing any UNSC resolutions criticizing Israel that did not also denounce Palestinian militant activity.

== United Nations General Assembly resolutions ==
United Nations General Assembly resolutions are as follows:

- 1947:
  - 29 November: Resolution 181: Recommending partition of the British Mandate for Palestine into Arab and Jewish states, and international status for the City of Jerusalem.
- 1948:
  - 11 December: Resolution 194: Establishes Conciliation Commission; protection of and free access to Jerusalem and other Holy Places; Resolves that the refugees wishing to return to their homes and live at peace with their neighbours should be permitted to do so at the earliest practicable date, and that compensation should be paid for the property of those choosing not to return and for loss of or damage to property which, under principles of international law or in equity, should be made good by the Governments or authorities responsible
- 1949:
  - 11 May: Resolution 273: Admission of Israel to membership in the UN
  - 9 December: Resolution 303(IV): International Regime for Jerusalem
  - 10 December: Resolution 356: Jerusalem
- 1950:
  - 14 December: Resolution 468: Reduces financing for an international regime in Jerusalem.
- 1952:
  - 26 January: Resolution 512: Report of the United Nations Conciliation Commission for Palestine.
  - 21 December: Resolution 619: "Takes note" of Israel's complaint against Arab ceasefire violations.
- 1956:
  - 2 November: Resolution 997: Called for an immediate ceasefire in the Suez Crisis, an arms embargo on the area, and condemned Israel's participation in the conflict as a violation of the 1949 Israel-Egypt General Armistice Agreement.
  - 4 November: Resolution 998: Called for the Secretary-General to submit a plan for a United Nations peacekeeping force to secure and supervise a ceasefire in the Suez Crisis.
  - 4 November: Resolution 999: Reaffirmed UN General Assembly Resolution 997.
  - 5 November: Resolution 1000: UN Force for Sinai.
  - 7 November: Resolution 1001: UN Force for Sinai.
  - 7 November: Resolution 1002: Calls for an unconditional Israeli withdrawal from the Sinai.
  - 10 November: Resolution 1003: The Suez Crisis.
  - 24 November: Resolution 1120: The Suez Crisis.
  - 24 November: Resolution 1121: The Suez Crisis.
  - 26 November: Resolution 1122: The Suez Crisis.
  - 26 November: Resolution 1089: Regarding the United Nations Emergency Force (UNEF).
- 1957:
  - 19 January: Resolution 1123: The Suez Crisis.
  - 2 February: Resolution 1124: The Suez Crisis.
  - 2 February: Resolution 1125: The Suez Crisis.
  - 22 February: Resolution 1126: The Suez Crisis.
  - 27 February: Resolution 1090: Administrative and financial arrangements for the UNEF.
  - 22 November: Resolution 1151: UNEF.
- 1958:
  - 21 August: Resolution 1237: The Situation in the Middle East.
  - 14 November: Resolution 1263: UNEF
  - 13 December: Resolution 1337: Cost estimates for the UNEF.
- 1959:
  - 5 December: Resolution 1441: UNEF.
  - 5 December: Resolution 1442: Approval of Major-General Gyani as commander of the UNEF.
- 1960:
  - 20 December: Resolution 1575: Cost estimates for the UNEF.
- 1961:
  - 20 December: Resolution 1733: Cost estimates for the UNEF.
- 1962:
  - 20 December: Resolution 1864: UNEF.
- 1963
  - 27 June: UN Special Assembly Resolution 1874.
  - 27 June: UN Special Assembly Resolution 1875.
  - 17 December: Resolution 1983 UNEF.
- 1965:
  - 21 December: Resolution 2115: UNEF.
- 1966:
  - 16 December: Resolution 2194: UNEF.
- 1967:
  - 4 July: Resolution 2252: Humanitarian assistance in the 1967 war.
  - 4 July: Resolution 2253 (ES-V): Condemns Israel's measures to change the status of Jerusalem as invalid
  - 14 July: Resolution 2254: "Deplores" Israel's failure to abide by UN General Assembly Resolution 2253 (ES-V)
  - 21 July: Resolution 2256: The Situation in the Middle East
  - 18 September: Resolution 2257: The Situation in the Middle East.
  - 13 December: Resolution 2304: UNEF.
- 1968:
  - 19 December: Resolution 2443: Establishes the Special Committee to Investigate Israeli Practices Affecting the Human Rights of the Palestinian People.
- 1969:
  - 11 December: Resolution 2546: Condemns Israeli "violations of human rights and fundamental freedoms" in the occupied territories
- 1970:
  - 4 November: Resolution 2628: Urges the speedy implementation of UN Security Council Resolution 242 and recognizes that "respect for the rights of the Palestinians is an indisputable element in the establishment of a just and lasting peace in the Middle East"
  - 5 December: Resolution 2727: Calls on Israel to implement the recommendations of the UN special committee investigating Israeli practices in the occupied territories
  - 15 December: Resolution 2728: Report of the Special Committee to investigate Israeli practices affecting the Human Rights of the population of the Occupied Territories.
- 1971:
  - 6 December: Resolution 2792: UNRWA Report. Calls for the implementation of UN General Assembly Resolution 194, stresses the "inalienable rights of the people of Palestine", and calls on Israel to stop resettling the inhabitants of Palestinian refugee camps.
  - 13 December: Resolution 2799: The Situation in the Middle East.
  - 20 December: Resolution 2851: Report of the Special Committee to investigate Israeli practices affecting the Human Rights of the population of the Occupied Territories. Condemns Israeli practices in the occupied territories.
- 1972:
  - 8 December: Resolution 2949: The Situation in the Middle East.
  - 15 December: Resolution 3005: Report of the Special Committee to investigate Israeli practices affecting the Human Rights of the population of the Occupied Territories.
- 1973:
  - 7 December: Resolution 3092: Report of the Special Committee to investigate Israeli practices affecting the Human Rights of the population of the Occupied Territories.
  - 11 December: Resolution 3101: Financing of the UNEF.
  - 17 December: Resolution 3175: Permanent sovereignty over natural resources in the occupied Arab territories.
- 1974:
  - 31 October and 29 November: Resolution 3211: Financing of the UNEF and the United Nations Disengagement Observer Force (UNDOF).
  - 29 November: Resolution 3240: Report of the Special Committee to Investigate Israeli Practices Affecting the Human Rights of the Population of the Occupied Territories.
  - 29 November: Resolution 3246: Affirms the legitimacy of armed resistance by oppressed peoples in pursuit of the right to self-determination, and condemns governments which do not support that right
  - 9 December: Resolution 3263: Calling for an establishment of a nuclear-weapon-free zone in the Middle East.
  - 17 December: Resolution 3336: Permanent sovereignty over national resources in the occupied Arab territories.
- 1975:
  - 30 October 28 November and 2 December: Resolution 3374: Financing of the UNEF and the UNDOF.
  - 10 November: United Nations General Assembly Resolution 3379: equating Zionism with racism.
  - 5 December: Resolution 3414: Calls for economic sanctions and an arms embargo on Israel until it withdraws from all territories occupied in 1967 and grants the Palestinians their "inalienable national rights".
  - 11 December: Resolution 3474: Calling for an establishment of a nuclear-weapon-free zone in the Middle East.
  - 15 December: Resolution 3516: Permanent sovereignty over national resources in the occupied Arab territories.
  - 15 December: Resolution 3525: Report of the Special Committee to Investigate Israeli Practices Affecting the Human Rights of the Population of the Occupied Territories.
- 1976:
  - 9 November: Resolution 31/6-E: Condemnation of the collaboration of Israel and South Africa.
  - 24 November: Resolution 31/20: Expresses deep concern that no "just solution" to the "problem of Palestine" has been achieved, refers to the problem as the core of the Middle East conflict, and reaffirms the "inalienable rights" of the Palestinians, including the right of return and the right to national independence.
  - 1 December: Resolution 31/5: Financing of the UNEF and the UNDOF.
  - 9 December: Resolution 31/61: Reaffirms previous condemnations of Israel, and calls for the Security Council to take "effective measures" against Israel, and requests sanctions on Israel.
  - 9 December: Resolution 31/62: Calls for an international Middle East peace conference under the auspices of the UN and co-chaired by the United States and Soviet Union.
  - 10 December: Resolution 31/71: Calling for an establishment of a nuclear-weapon-free zone in the Middle East.
  - 16 December: Resolution 31/106: Report of the Special Committee to Investigate Israeli Practices Affecting the Human Rights of the Occupied Territories.
  - 21 December: Resolution 31/186: Permanent sovereignty over national resources in the occupied Arab territories.
- 1977:
  - 25 October and 2 December: Resolution 32/4: Financing of the UNEF and the UNDOF.
  - 28 October: Resolution 32/5: Reaffirms previous condemnations of Israel, and stresses the "urgent need" to achieve a "just and lasting peace in the Middle East".
  - 25 November: Resolution 32/20: Reaffirms previous calls for a full Israeli withdrawal from the occupied territories and an international peace conference with PLO participation.
  - 2 December: Resolution 32/40: Reaffirms the "inalienable rights of the Palestinian people", including the right to national sovereignty and the right of return.
  - 12 December: Resolution 32/82: Calling for an establishment of a nuclear-weapon-free zone in the Middle East.
  - 13 December: Resolution 32/91: Report of the Special Committee to Investigate Israeli Practices Affecting the Human Rights of the Population of the Occupied Territories. Calls on Israel to respect the Geneva Conventions
  - 19 December: Resolution 32/161: Permanent sovereignty over national resources in the occupied Arab territories.
- 1978:
  - 3 November: Resolution 33/13: Financing of the UNEF and the UNDOF.
  - 7 December: Resolution 33/29: Reaffirms previous calls for a full Israeli withdrawal from the occupied territories and an international peace conference with PLO participation.
  - 14 December: Resolution 33/64: Calling for an establishment of a nuclear-weapon-free zone in the Middle East.
  - 14 December: Resolution 33/71-A: Expressing concern over military build-up and attempts to acquire nuclear weapons of Israel. Calling for arms embargo against Israel.
  - 18 December: Resolution 33/113: Report of the Special Committee to Investigate Israeli Practices Affecting the Human Rights of the Population of the Occupied Territories.
- 1979:
  - 24 January: Resolution 33/183-D: Demanding that Israel terminate all form of collaboration with South Africa.
  - 25 October 3 and 17 December: Resolution 34/7: Financing of the UNEF and the UNDOF.
  - 16 November: Resolution 34/29: Expressing concern over the deportation of the Bassam Shakaa, Mayor of Nablus, by Israel.
  - 6 December: Resolution 34/70: Reaffirms previous calls for a full Israeli withdrawal from the occupied territories and an international peace conference with PLO participation.
  - 11 December: Resolution 34/77: Calling for an establishment of a nuclear-weapon-free zone in the Middle East.
  - 11 December: Resolution 34/89: Israeli nuclear armament.
  - 12 December: Resolution 34/90: Report of the Special Committee to Investigate Israeli Practices Affecting the Human Rights of the Population of the Occupied Territories.
  - 12 December: Resolution 34/93-P: Demanding that Israel terminate all forms of collaboration with South Africa.
  - 14 December: Resolution 34/136: Permanent sovereignty over national resources in the occupied Arab territories.
- 1980:
  - 1 December: Resolution 35/45: Financing of UNDOF.
  - 5 December: Resolution 35/110: Permanent sovereignty over national resources in the occupied Arab territories.
  - 11 December: Resolution 35/122: Report of the Special Committee to Investigate Israeli Practices Affecting the Human Rights of the Population of the Occupied Territories.
  - 12 December: Resolution 35/147: Calling for an establishment of a nuclear-weapon-free zone in the Middle East.
  - 12 December: Resolution 35/157: Israeli nuclear armament.
  - 16 December: Resolution 35/206-H: Demanding that Israel terminate all forms of collaboration with South Africa.
  - 16 December: Resolution 35/207: Reaffirms previous calls for a full Israeli withdrawal from the occupied territories and the establishment of a Palestinian state.
- 1981:
  - 28 October: Resolution 36/15: Demanding that Israel desist any archaeological excavations in the Temple Mount.
  - 13 November: Resolution 36/27: Condemns Israeli attack on Iraqi nuclear facilities and demands Israel to compensate Iraq.
  - 30 November: Resolution 36/66: Financing of UNDOF.
  - 9 December: Resolution 36/87: Calling for an establishment of a nuclear-weapon-free zone in the Middle East.
  - 9 December: Resolution 36/98: Israeli nuclear armament. Demands that Israel renounce possession of nuclear weapons and submit its facilities to inspection.
  - 16 December: Resolution 36/147: Report of the Special Committee to Investigate Israeli Practices Affecting the Human Rights of the Population of the Occupied Territories.
  - 16 December: Resolution 36/150: Demands Israel to cease planning of a canal between the Dead Sea and the Mediterranean.
  - 17 December: Resolution 36/172-M: Demanding that Israel terminate all forms of collaboration with South Africa.
  - 17 December: Resolution 36/173: Permanent sovereignty over national resources in the occupied Arab territories.
  - 17 December: UN General Assembly Resolutions 36/226 A & B: Reaffirms previous calls for a full Israeli withdrawal from the occupied territories and the establishment of a Palestinian state.
- 1982:
  - 5 February: Ninth Emergency Special Session ES/9-1: The situation in the occupied Arab territories.
  - 16 November: Resolution 37/18: Condemns Israel's refusal to implement Security Council resolution 487, and demands Israel to withdraw its threat to attack nuclear facilities of neighbouring nations.
  - 30 November: Resolution 37/38: Financing of UNDOF.
  - 9 December: Resolution 37/75: Calling for an establishment of a nuclear-weapon-free zone in the Middle East.
  - 9 December: Resolution 37/82: Israeli nuclear armament.
  - 10 December: Resolution 37/88: Report of the Special Committee to Investigate Israeli Practices Affecting the Human Rights of the Population of the Occupied Territories.
  - 16 December: Resolution 37/122: Demands Israel not to build a canal between the Dead Sea and the Mediterranean.
  - 16 December: Resolution 37/123: Condemnation of Israel's alleged responsibility for the Sabra and Shatila massacre by Kataeb Party in Beirut, Lebanon; resolves that the massacre was an act of genocide; condemns acts of plundering Palestinian cultural heritage; condemns the occupation of the West Bank, Gaza and the Golan Heights; and condemns the annexation of Jerusalem.
  - 17 December: Resolution 37/135: Permanent sovereignty over national resources in the occupied Palestinian and other Arab territories.
  - 20 December: Resolution 37/222: Living conditions of the Palestinian people in the occupied Palestinian territories.
- 1983:
  - 10 November: Resolution 38/9: Reiterates the demand that Israel withdraw its threat to attack the nuclear facilities of neighbouring nations.
  - 1 December: Resolution 38/35: Financing of UNDOF.
  - 5 December: Resolution 38/39-F: Demanding that Israel terminate all forms of collaboration with South Africa.
  - 13 December: Resolution 38/64: Calling for an establishment of a nuclear-weapon-free zone in the Middle East.
  - 15 December: Resolution 38/69: Israeli nuclear armament.
  - 15 December: Resolutions 38/79: Report of the Special Committee to Investigate Israeli Practices Affecting the Human Rights of the Population of the Occupied Territories.
  - 15 December: Resolution 38/85: Demands Israel not to build a canal between the Dead Sea and the Mediterranean.
  - 19 December: Resolution 38/144: Permanent sovereignty over national resources in the occupied Palestinian and other Arab territories.
  - 19 December: Resolution 38/166: Living conditions of the Palestinian people in the occupied Palestinian territories.
  - 19 December: Resolutions 38/180: Calls all nations to suspend or sever all diplomatic, economic and technological ties with Israel. Condemnation of Israel on various topics including the occupation of the West Bank, Gaza and the Golan Heights, war in Lebanon and the annexation of Jerusalem.
- 1984:
  - 23 November: Resolution 39/14: Reiterates the demand that Israel withdraw its threat to attack the nuclear facilities of neighbouring nations.
  - 30 November: Resolution 39/28: Financing of UNDOF.
  - 12 December: Resolution 39/54: Calling for an establishment of a nuclear-weapon-free zone in the Middle East.
  - 13 December: Resolution 39/72-C: Demanding that Israel terminate all form of collaboration with South Africa.
  - 14 December: Resolutions 39/95: Report of the Special Committee to Investigate Israeli Practices Affecting the Human Rights of the Population of the Occupied Territories.
  - 14 December: Resolution 39/101: Demands Israel not to build a canal between the Dead Sea and the Mediterranean.
  - 14 December: Resolution 39/146: Reaffirmation of resolution 38/180 condemning Israel and calling all nations to cut ties with it.
  - 17 December: Resolution 39/147: Israeli nuclear armament.
  - 17 December: Resolution 39/169: Living conditions of the Palestinian people in the occupied Palestinian territories.
  - 18 December: Resolution 39/223: Economic development projects in the occupied Palestinian territories.
- 1985:
  - 1 November: Resolution 40/6: Reaffirmation of the condemnation of Israel on its attack on the Iraqi nuclear facility.
  - 2 December: Resolution 40/59: Financing of UNDOF.
  - 10 December: Resolution 40/64-E: Demanding that Israel terminate all forms of collaboration with South Africa.
  - 12 December: Resolution 40/82: Calling for an establishment of a nuclear-weapon-free zone in the Middle East.
  - 12 December: Resolution 40/93: Israeli nuclear armament.
  - 16 December: Resolutions 40/161: Report of the Special Committee to Investigate Israeli Practices Affecting the Human Rights of the Population of the Occupied Territories.
  - 16 December: Resolution 40/167: Decides to monitor Israel's decision to construct a canal between the Dead Sea and the Mediterranean.
  - 16 December: Resolution 40/168: Reaffirmation of resolution 38/180 condemning Israel and calling all nations to cut ties with it.
  - 17 December: Resolution 40/169: Economic development projects in the occupied Palestinian territories.
  - 17 December: Resolution 40/201: Living conditions of the Palestinian people in the occupied Palestinian territories.
- 1986:
  - 29 October: Resolution 41/12: Calling Israel to place its nuclear facilities under the supervision of the International Atomic Energy Agency (IAEA).
  - 10 November: Resolution 41/35-C: Demanding that Israel terminate all forms of collaboration with South Africa.
  - 3 December: Resolution 41/44: Financing of UNDOF.
  - 3 December: Resolution 41/48: Calling for an establishment of a nuclear-weapon-free zone in the Middle East.
  - 3 December: Resolutions 41/63: Report of the Special Committee to Investigate Israeli Practices Affecting the Human Rights of the Population of the Occupied Territories.
  - 4 December: Resolution 41/93: Israeli nuclear armament.
  - 4 December: Resolution 41/162: Reaffirmation of resolution 38/180 condemning Israel and calling all nations to cut ties with it.
- 1987:
  - 20 November: Resolution 42/23-D: Demanding that Israel terminate all forms of collaboration with South Africa.
  - 30 November: Resolution 42/28: Calling for an establishment of a nuclear-weapon-free zone in the Middle East.
  - 30 November: Resolution 42/44: Israeli nuclear armament.
  - 3 December: Resolution 42/70: Financing of UNDOF.
  - 8 December: Resolutions 42/160: Report of the Special Committee to Investigate Israeli Practices Affecting the Human Rights of the Population of the Occupied Territories.
  - 11 December: Resolution 42/166: Assistance to the Palestinian people.
  - 11 December: Resolution 42/190: Living conditions of the Palestinian people in the occupied Palestinian territories.
  - 11 December: Resolution 42/209: Reaffirmation of resolution 38/180 condemning Israel and calling all nations to cut ties with it.
- 1988:
  - 3 November: Resolution 43/21: The First Palestinian Intifada.
  - 5 December: Resolution 43/50-E: Demanding that Israel terminate all forms of collaboration with South Africa.
  - 6 December: Resolution 43/54: Reaffirmation of resolution 38/180 condemning Israel and calling all nations to cut ties with it.
  - 6 December: Resolutions 43/58: Report of the Special Committee to Investigate Israeli Practices Affecting the Human Rights of the Population of the Occupied Territories.
  - 7 December: Resolution 43/65: Calling for an establishment of a nuclear-weapon-free zone in the Middle East.
  - 7 December: Resolution 43/80: Israeli nuclear armament.
  - 15 December: UN General Assembly Resolution 43/176: International Peace Conference; principles for peace
  - 21 December: Resolution 43/228: Financing of UNDOF.
- 1989:
  - 20 April: Resolution 43/233: Expressing shock over killing of Palestinian civilians in Nahalin.
- 1991:
  - 16 December: Resolution 4686: Annulled Res. 3379
- 2012
  - 29 March: Resolution 66/225: Exploitation of natural resources.
- 2017
  - 21 December: Resolution ES-10/19: Criticizing US policy on Jerusalem.
- 2018
  - 13 June: Resolution ES-10/20: Criticizing the Israeli response to the 2018 Gaza border protests.
- 2023
  - 27 October: Resolution ES-10/21: Protection of civilians and upholding legal and humanitarian obligations in the Gaza war.
  - 12 December: Resolution ES-10/22

== United Nations Security Council resolutions ==
United Nations Security Council resolutions are as follows:

1. Resolution 42: The Palestine Question (5 March 1948) Requests recommendations for the Palestine Commission
2. Resolution 43: The Palestine Question (1 Apr 1948) Recognizes "increasing violence and disorder in Palestine" and requests that representatives of "the Jewish Agency for Palestine and the Arab Higher Committee" arrange, with the Security Council, "a truce between the Arab and Jewish Communities of Palestine ... Calls upon Arab and Jewish armed groups in Palestine to cease acts of violence immediately."
3. Resolution 44: The Palestine Question (1 Apr 1948) Requests convocation of special session of the General Assembly
4. Resolution 46: The Palestine Question (17 Apr 1948) As the United Kingdom is the Mandatory Power, "it is responsible for the maintenance of peace and order in Palestine." The Resolutions also "Calls upon all persons and organizations in Palestine" to stop importing "armed bands and fighting personnel ... whatever their origin; ... weapons and war materials; ... Refrain, pending the future government of Palestine...from any political activity which might prejudice the rights, claims, or position of either community; ... refrain from any action which will endanger the safety of the Holy Places in Palestine."
5. Resolution 48: 23 April 1948, calls on all concerned parties to comply with UNSC Resolution 46 and establishes a Truce Commission for Palestine to assist the SC in implementing the truce. Approved 8–0, abstentions from Colombia, Ukrainian SSR and USSR.
6. Resolution 49: 22 May 1948 issues a cease-fire order to come into effect at noon, 24 May 1948, New York City local time. Orders the Truce Commission for Palestine previously set up to report on compliance. Adopted by 8–0, abstentions from Ukrainian SSR, USSR and Syria.
7. Resolution 50: 29 May 1948, calls for a four-week ceasefire covering Palestine, Egypt, Iraq, Lebanon, Saudi Arabia, Syria, Transjordan and Yemen. Urges all to protect the Holy Places and Jerusalem. Offers the UN Mediator as many military observers as necessary. Further violations and the council would consider action under Chapter VII of the UN Charter. Adopted in parts; no voting on the resolution as a whole.
8. Resolution 53: The Palestine Question (7 Jul 1948)
9. Resolution 54: The Palestine Question (15 Jul 1948)
10. Resolution 56: The Palestine Question (19 Aug 1948)
11. Resolution 57: The Palestine Question (18 Sep 1948)
12. Resolution 59: The Palestine Question (19 Oct 1948)
13. Resolution 60: The Palestine Question (29 Oct 1948)
14. Resolution 61: The Palestine Question (4 Nov 1948)
15. Resolution 62: The Palestine Question (16 Nov 1948)
16. Resolution 66: The Palestine Question (29 Dec 1948)
17. Resolution 69: Israel's admission to the UN (4 Mar 1949)
18. Resolution 72: The Palestine Question (11 Aug 1949)
19. Resolution 73: The Palestine Question (11 Aug 1949)
20. Resolution 89 (17 November 1950): regarding Armistice in 1948 Arab–Israeli War and "transfer of persons".
21. Resolution 92: The Palestine Question (8 May 1951)
22. Resolution 93: The Palestine Question (18 May 1951)
23. Resolution 95: The Palestine Question (1 Sep 1951)
24. Resolution 100: The Palestine Question (27 Oct 1953)
25. Resolution 101: The Palestine Question (24 Nov 1953)
26. Resolution 106: The Palestine Question (29 Mar 1955) 'condemns' Israel for Gaza raid.
27. Resolution 107: The Palestine Question (30 March)
28. Resolution 108: The Palestine Question (8 September)
29. Resolution 111: The Palestine Question (19 January 1956) " ... 'condemns' Israel for raid on Syria that killed fifty-six people".
30. Resolution 113: The Palestine Question (4 April)
31. Resolution 114: The Palestine Question (4 June)
32. Resolution 127: The Palestine Question (22 January 1958) " ... 'recommends' Israel suspends its 'no-man's zone' in Jerusalem".
33. Resolution 138: (23 June 1960) Question relating to the case of Israel's capture of Adolf Eichmann, concerning Argentina's complaint that Israel breached its sovereignty.
34. Resolution 162: The Palestine Question (11 April 1961) " ... 'urges' Israel to comply with UN decisions".
35. Resolution 171: The Palestine Question (9 April 1962) " ... determines flagrant violations' by Israel in its attack on Syria".
36. Resolution 228: The Palestine Question (25 November 1966) " ... 'censures' Israel for its attack on Samu in the West Bank, then under Jordanian control".
37. Resolution 233 Six-Day War (6 June 1967)
38. Resolution 234 Six-Day War (7 June 1967)
39. Resolution 235 Six-Day War (9 June 1967)
40. Resolution 236 Six-Day War (11 June 1967)
41. Resolution 237: Six-Day War 14 June 1967) " ... 'urges' Israel to allow return of new 1967 Palestinian refugees". and called on Israel to ensure the safety and welfare of inhabitants of areas where fighting had taken place.
42. Resolution 240 (25 October 1967): concerning violations of the cease-fire
43. Resolution 242 (22 November 1967): Termination of all claims or states of belligerency and respect for and acknowledgment of the sovereignty, territorial integrity and political independence of every State in the area. Calls on Israel's neighbors to end the state of belligerency and calls upon Israel to reciprocate by withdraw its forces from land claimed by other parties in 1967 war. Interpreted commonly today as calling for the land for peace principle as a way to resolve Arab–Israeli conflict.
44. Resolution 248: (24 March 1968) " ... 'condemns' Israel for its massive attack on Karameh in Jordan".
45. Resolution 250: (27 April) " ... 'calls' on Israel to refrain from holding military parade in Jerusalem".
46. Resolution 251: (2 May) " ... 'deeply deplores' Israeli military parade in Jerusalem in defiance of Resolution 250".
47. Resolution 252: (21 May) " ... 'declares invalid' Israel's acts to unify Jerusalem as Jewish capital".
48. Resolution 256: (16 August) " ... 'condemns' Israeli raids on Jordan as 'flagrant violation".
49. Resolution 258: (18 September) ... expressed 'concern' with the welfare of the inhabitants of the Israeli-occupied territories, and requested a special representative to be sent to report on the implementation of Resolution 237, and that Israel cooperate.
50. Resolution 259: (27 September) " ... 'deplores' Israel's refusal to accept UN mission to probe occupation".
51. Resolution 262: (31 December) " ... 'condemns' Israel for attack on Beirut airport".
52. Resolution 265: (1 April 1969) " ... 'condemns' Israel for air attacks on Salt".
53. Resolution 267: (3 July) " ... 'censures' Israel for administrative acts to change the status of Jerusalem".
54. Resolution 270: (26 August) " ... 'condemns' Israel for air attacks on villages in southern Lebanon".
55. Resolution 271: (15 September) " ... 'condemns' Israel's failure to obey UN resolutions on Jerusalem".
56. Resolution 279: (12 May 1970) "Demands the immediate withdrawal of all Israeli armed forces from Lebanese territory."(full text)
57. Resolution 280: (19 May) " ... 'condemns' Israeli's attacks against Lebanon".
58. Resolution 285: (5 September) " ... 'demands' immediate Israeli withdrawal from Lebanon".
59. Resolution 298: (25 September 1971) " ... 'deplores' Israel's changing of the status of Jerusalem".
60. Resolution 313: (28 February 1972) " ... 'demands' that Israel stop attacks against Lebanon".
61. Resolution 316: (26 June) " ... 'condemns' Israel for repeated attacks on Lebanon".
62. Resolution 317: (21 July) " ... 'deplores' Israel's refusal to release Arabs abducted in Lebanon".
63. Resolution 331: (20 April 1973)
64. Resolution 332: (21 April) " ... 'condemns' Israel's repeated attacks against Lebanon".
65. Resolution 337: (15 August) " ... 'condemns' Israel for violating Lebanon's sovereignty and territorial integrity and for the forcible diversion and seizure of a Lebanese airliner from Lebanon's air space".
66. Resolution 338 (22 October 1973): " ...'calls' for a cease fire" in Yom Kippur War and "the implementation of Security Council Resolution 242 (1967) in all of its parts", and "Decides that, immediately and concurrently with the cease-fire, negotiations shall start between the parties concerned under appropriate auspices aimed at establishing a just and durable peace in the Middle East."
67. Resolution 339 (23 October 1973): Confirms Res. 338, dispatch UN observers.
68. Resolution 340 (25 October): "Demands that immediate and complete cease-fire be observed, per 338 and 339, and requests to increase the number of United Nations military observers"
69. Resolution 341 (27 October): "Approves the report on the implementation resolution 340"
70. Resolution 344 (15 December)
71. Resolution 346 (8 April 1974)
72. Resolution 347: (24 April)" ... 'condemns' Israeli attacks on Lebanon".
73. Resolution 350 (31 May 1974) established the United Nations Disengagement Observer Force, to monitor the ceasefire between Israel and Syria in the wake of the Yom Kippur War.
74. Resolution 362 (23 October) decides to extend the mandate of the United Nations Emergency Force for another six months
75. Resolution 363 (29 November)
76. Resolution 368 (17 April 1975), called on the parties involved in the prevailing state of tension in the Middle East to immediately implement Resolution 338.
77. Resolution 369 (28 May 1975), expressed concern over the prevailing state of tension in the Middle East, reaffirmed that the two previous agreements were only a step towards the implementation of Resolution 338 and called on the parties to implement it, and extended the mandate of the United Nations Disengagement Observer Force.
78. Resolution 371, expressed concern at a lack of progress towards a lasting peace in the Middle East.
79. Resolution 378, called for the implementation of Resolution 338 and extended the mandate of the United Nations Emergency Force.
80. Resolution 381, expressed concern over continued tensions, extended the mandate of the United Nations Emergency Force, and scheduled a later meeting to continue the debate on the Middle East.
81. Resolution 390, considered a report regarding the United Nations Disengagement Observer Force and extended its mandate, noted the efforts to establish peace in the Middle East, but expressed concern over the prevailing state of tensions, and called for the implementation of Resolution 338.
82. Resolution 396
83. Resolution 408
84. Resolution 416
85. Resolution 420, regarding the United Nations Disengagement Observer Force.
86. Resolution 425 (1978): " ... 'calls' on Israel to withdraw its forces from Lebanon". Israel's withdrawal from Lebanon was completed by 16 June 2000.
87. Resolution 426, established the United Nations Interim Force in Lebanon (UNIFIL).
88. Resolution 427: " ... 'calls' on Israel to complete its withdrawal from Lebanon".
89. Resolution 429
90. Resolution 434, renewed the mandate of UNIFIL and called upon Israel and Lebanon to implement prior resolutions.
91. Resolution 438
92. Resolution 441
93. Resolution 444: " ... 'deplores' Israel's lack of cooperation with UN peacekeeping forces".
94. Resolution 446 (1979): 'determines' that Israeli settlements are a 'serious obstruction' to peace and calls on Israel to abide by the Fourth Geneva Convention".
95. Resolution 449, regarding the United Nations Disengagement Observer Force.
96. Resolution 450: " ... 'calls' on Israel to stop attacking Lebanon".
97. Resolution 452: " ... 'calls' on Israel to cease building settlements in occupied territories".
98. Resolution 456, regarding the United Nations Disengagement Observer Force.
99. Resolution 459, regarding UNIFIL.
100. Resolution 465: " ... 'deplores' Israel's settlements and asks all member states not to assist Israel's settlements program".
101. Resolution 467: " ... 'strongly deplores' Israel's military intervention in Lebanon".
102. Resolution 468: " ... 'calls' on Israel to rescind illegal expulsions of two Palestinian mayors and a judge and to facilitate their return".
103. Resolution 469: " ... 'strongly deplores' Israel's failure to observe the council's order not to deport Palestinians".
104. Resolution 470, regarding the United Nations Disengagement Observer Force.
105. Resolution 471: " ... 'expresses deep concern' at Israel's failure to abide by the Fourth Geneva Convention".
106. Resolution 474, regarding the United Nations Disengagement Observer Force.
107. Resolution 476: " ... 'reiterates' that Israel's claim to Jerusalem are 'null and void'". The altering of the status of Jerusalem constitutes as a flagrant violation of the 4th Geneva Convention.
108. Resolution 478 (20 August 1980): 'censures (Israel) in the strongest terms' for its claim to Jerusalem in its 'Basic Law'.
109. Resolution 481, regarding the United Nations Disengagement Observer Force.
110. Resolution 483, noted the continuing need for UNIFIL given the situation between Israel and Lebanon, and extended its mandate.
111. Resolution 484: " ... 'declares it imperative' that Israel re-admit two deported Palestinian mayors".
112. Resolution 485, regarding the United Nations Disengagement Observer Force.
113. Resolution 487: " ... 'strongly condemns' Israel for its attack on Iraq's nuclear facility", and 'Calls upon' Israel urgently to place its nuclear facilities under the safeguards of the International Atomic Energy Agency.
114. Resolution 488, regarding UNIFIL.
115. Resolution 493, regarding the United Nations Disengagement Observer Force.
116. Resolution 497 (17 December 1981), decides that Israel's annexation of Syria's Golan Heights is 'null and void' and demands that Israel rescinds its decision forthwith.
117. Resolution 498: " ... 'calls' on Israel to withdraw from Lebanon".
118. Resolution 501: " ... 'calls' on Israel to stop attacks against Lebanon and withdraw its troops".
119. Resolution 506, regarding the United Nations Disengagement Observer Force.
120. Resolution 508: demanded an end to hostilities between Israel and the PLO taking place in Lebanon, and called for a cease-fire.
121. Resolution 509: " ... 'demands' that Israel withdraw its forces forthwith and unconditionally from Lebanon".
122. Resolution 511, extended the mandate of UNIFIL.
123. Resolution 515: " ... 'demands' that Israel lift its siege of Beirut and allow food supplies to be brought in".
124. Resolution 516, demanded an immediate cessation of military activities in Lebanon, noting violations of the cease-fire in Beirut.
125. Resolution 517: " ... 'censures' Israel for failing to obey UN resolutions and demands that Israel withdraw its forces from Lebanon".
126. Resolution 518: " ... 'demands' that Israel cooperate fully with UN forces in Lebanon".
127. Resolution 519, extended the mandate of UNIFIL, and authorized it to carry out humanitarian tasks.
128. Resolution 520: " ... 'condemns' Israel's attack into West Beirut".
129. Resolution 523, regards UNIFIL
130. Resolution 524
131. Resolution 529
132. Resolution 531
133. Resolution 536
134. Resolution 538
135. Resolution 543
136. Resolution 549
137. Resolution 551
138. Resolution 555
139. Resolution 557
140. Resolution 561
141. Resolution 563
142. Resolution 573: " ... 'condemns' Israel 'vigorously' for bombing Tunisia in attack on PLO headquarters."
143. Resolution 575
144. Resolution 576
145. Resolution 583
146. Resolution 584
147. Resolution 586
148. Resolution 587 " ... 'takes note' of previous calls on Israel to withdraw its forces from Lebanon and urges all parties to withdraw".
149. Resolution 590: UNDOF
150. Resolution 592: " ... 'strongly deplores' the killing of Palestinian students at Birzeit University by Israeli troops".
151. Resolution 594
152. Resolution 596
153. Resolution 599
154. Resolution 603
155. Resolution 605: " ... 'strongly deplores' Israel's policies and practices denying the human rights of Palestinians."
156. Resolution 607: " ... 'calls' on Israel not to deport Palestinians and strongly requests it to abide by the Fourth Geneva Convention."
157. Resolution 608: " ... 'deeply regrets' that Israel has defied the United Nations and deported Palestinian civilians".
158. Resolution 609
159. Resolution 611: "... condemned Israel's assassination of Khalil al-Wazir as a 'flagrant violation of the Charter'"
160. Resolution 613
161. Resolution 617
162. Resolution 624
163. Resolution 630
164. Resolution 633
165. Resolution 636: " ... 'deeply regrets' Israeli deportation of Palestinian civilians."
166. Resolution 639 (31 Jul 1989)
167. Resolution 641 (30 Aug 1989): " ... 'deplores' Israel's continuing deportation of Palestinians."
168. Resolution 645 (29 Nov 1989)
169. Resolution 648 (31 Jan 1990) The Security Council extends the mandate of the UN Interim Force in Lebanon until 31 July 1990.
170. Resolution 655 (31 May 1990)
171. Resolution 659 (31 Jul 1990): Regards UNIFIL, extends the mandate for UNIFIL
172. Resolution 672 (12 Oct 1990): " ... 'condemns' Israel for "violence against Palestinians" at the Haram al-Sharif/Temple Mount."
173. Resolution 673 (24 Oct 1990): " ... 'deplores' Israel's refusal to cooperate with the United Nations."
174. Resolution 679 (30 Nov 1990)
175. Resolution 681 (20 Dec 1990): " ... 'deplores' Israel's resumption of the deportation of Palestinians."
176. Resolution 684 (30 Jan 1991)
177. Resolution 694 (24 May 1991): " ... 'deplores' Israel's deportation of Palestinians and calls on it to ensure their safe and immediate return."
178. Resolution 695 (30 May 1991)
179. Resolution 701 (31 Jul 1991)
180. Resolution 722 (29 Nov 1991)
181. Resolution 726 (6 Jan 1992): " ... 'strongly condemns' Israel's deportation of Palestinians."
182. Resolution 734 (29 Jan 1992)
183. Resolution 756 (29 May 1992)
184. Resolution 768 (30 Jul 1992)
185. Resolution 790 (25 Nov 1992)
186. Resolution 799 (18 Dec 1992): ". . . 'strongly condemns' Israel's deportation of 413 Palestinians and calls for their immediate return."
187. Resolution 803 (28 Jan 1993)
188. Resolution 830 (26 May 1993)
189. Resolution 852 (28 Jul 1993)
190. Resolution 887 (29 Nov 1993)
191. Resolution 895 (28 Jan 1994)
192. Resolution 904 (18 Mar 1994): Cave of the Patriarchs massacre.
193. Resolution 938 (28 Jul 1994): extends mandate of the United Nations Interim Force in Lebanon until 31 January 1995.
194. Resolution 1039 (29 Jan 1996): Extends mandate of the UNIFIL until 31 July 1996.
195. Resolution 1052 (18 Apr 1996)
196. Resolution 1057 (30 May 1996)
197. Resolution 1068 (30 Jul 1996)
198. Resolution 1073 (28 Sep 1996) on the status of Jerusalem
199. Resolution 1081 (27 Nov 1996)
200. Resolution 1095 (28 Jan 1997)
201. Resolution 1109 (28 May 1997)
202. Resolution 1122 (29 Jul 1997)
203. Resolution 1139 (21 Nov 1997)
204. Resolution 1151 (30 Jan 1998)
205. Resolution 1169 (27 May 1998)
206. Resolution 1188 (30 Jul 1998)
207. Resolution 1211 (25 Nov 1998)
208. Resolution 1223 (28 Jan 1999)
209. Resolution 1243 (27 May 1999)
210. Resolution 1254 (30 Jul 1999)
211. Resolution 1276 (24 Nov 1999)
212. Resolution 1288 (31 Jan 2000)
213. Resolution 1300 (31 May 2000)
214. Resolution 1310 (27 Jul 2000)
215. Resolution 1322 (7 Oct 2000) deplored Ariel Sharon's visit to the Temple Mount and the violence that followed
216. Resolution 1328 (27 Nov 2000)
217. Resolution 1337 (30 Jan 2001)
218. Resolution 1351 (30 May 2001)
219. Resolution 1397 (12 Mar 2002) the first resolution to explicitly call for a two-state solution.
220. Resolution 1435 (24 Sep 2002) demanded an end to Israeli measures in and around Ramallah, and an Israeli withdrawal to positions held before September 2000.
221. Resolution 1583 (28 January 2005) calls on Lebanon to assert full control over its border with Israel. It also states that "the Council has recognized the Blue Line as valid for the purpose of confirming Israel's withdrawal pursuant to resolution 425."
222. Resolution 1648 (21 December 2005)
223. Resolution 1701 (11 August 2006) called for the full cessation of hostilities between Israel and Hezbollah.
224. Resolution 1860 (9 January 2009) called for the full cessation of war between Israel and Hamas.
225. Resolution 2334 (23 December 2016) called for an end to Israeli settlement building.
226. Resolution 2712 (15 November 2023) called for humanitarian pauses and corridors in Gaza during the Gaza war
227. Resolution 2720 (22 December 2023) called for increased aid for the Gaza humanitarian crisis, including the provisioning of fuel, food, and medical supplies, opening of all Gaza border crossings to humanitarian aid, and proposed the appointment of a Senior Humanitarian and Reconstruction Coordinator for Gaza
228. Resolution 2728 (25 March 2024) called for ceasefire in the Gaza war
229. Resolution 2735 (10 June 2024) backed a hostage and ceasefire proposal in the Gaza war and reiterated support for a two-state solution

== See also ==
- Israel and the United Nations
- League of Nations
- List of United Nations resolutions concerning Palestine
- Palestine and the United Nations
- Palestinian Security Council Resolution, 2011
- UN Watch
- United Nations
- United Nations General Assembly resolution 67/19 (2012)
- United Nations Security Council resolution
