= United Nations Security Council Resolution 446 =

UN Security Council Resolution 446
- Map of territories occupied by Israel
- Date: 22 March 1979
- Meeting no.: 2,134
- Code: S/RES/446 (Document)
- Subject: Territories occupied by Israel
- Voting summary: 12 voted for; None voted against; 3 abstained
- Result: Adopted

Security Council composition
- Permanent members: China; France; Soviet Union; United Kingdom; United States
- Non-permanent members: Bangladesh; Bolivia; Czechoslovakia; Gabon; Jamaica; Kuwait; Nigeria; Norway; Portugal; Zambia

United Nations Security Council resolution 446, adopted on 22 March 1979, concerned the issue of Israeli settlements in the "Arab territories occupied by Israel since 1967, including Jerusalem". This refers to the Palestinian territories of the West Bank, East Jerusalem and the Gaza Strip as well as the Syrian Golan Heights.

In the resolution, the Security Council determined: "that the policy and practices of Israel in establishing settlements in the Palestinian and other Arab territories occupied since 1967 have no legal validity and constitute a serious obstruction to achieving a comprehensive, just and lasting peace in the Middle East".

The resolution was adopted by 12 votes to none, with 3 abstentions from Norway, the United Kingdom and the United States.

== Text of resolution ==
The Security Council,

Having heard the statement of the Permanent Representative of Jordan and other statements made before the Council,

Stressing the urgent need to achieve a comprehensive, just and lasting peace in the Middle East,

Affirming once more that the Geneva Convention relative to the Protection of Civilian Persons in Time of War, of 12 August 1949 is applicable to the Arab territories occupied by Israel since 1967, including Jerusalem,

1. Determines that the policy and practices of Israel in establishing settlements in the Palestinian and other Arab territories occupied since 1967 have no legal validity and constitute a serious obstruction to achieving a comprehensive, just and lasting peace in the Middle East;

2. Strongly deplores the failure of Israel to abide by Security Council resolutions 237 (1967) of 14 June 1967, 252 (1968) of 21 May 1968 and 298 (1971) of 25 September 1971 and the consensus statement by the President of the Security Council on 11 November 1976 and General Assembly resolutions 2253 (ES-V) and 2254 (ES-V) of 4 and 14 July 1967, 32/5 of 28 October 1977 and 33/113 of 18 December 1978;

3. Calls once more upon Israel, as the occupying Power, to abide scrupulously by the 1949 Fourth Geneva Convention, to rescind its previous measures and to desist from taking any action which would result in changing the legal status and geographical nature and materially affecting the demographic composition of the Arab territories occupied since 1967, including Jerusalem, and, in particular, not to transfer parts of its own civilian population into the occupied Arab territories;

4. Establishes a Commission consisting of three members of the Security Council, to be appointed by the President of the Council after consultations with the members of the Council, to examine the situation relating to settlements in the Arab territories occupied since 1967, including Jerusalem;

5. Requests the Commission to submit its report to the Security Council by 1 July 1979;

6. Requests the Secretary-General to provide the Commission with the necessary facilities to enable it to carry out its mission.

7. Decides to keep the situation in the occupied territories under constant and close scrutiny and to reconvene in July 1979 to review the situation in the light of the findings of the Commission.

== UNSC Resolution 446 and the Fourth Geneva Convention ==
Resolution 446 affirms "once more that the Fourth Geneva Convention relative to the Protection of Civilian Persons in Time of War of 12 August 1949 is applicable to the Arab territories occupied by Israel since 1967, including Jerusalem". Tomis Kapitan reports that:

"In the eyes of the world community, its [Israel's] presence there [in the Occupied Territories] is subject to international law dealing with belligerent occupancy, specifically, the Fourth Geneva Convention of 1949... Allowing for measures of military necessity, the Convention forbids alterations of the legal system, forcible transfer or deportation of the resident population, and resettlement by the occupying power of its own civilian population within the occupied territory. Israel has violated these provisions, but contested their application on the grounds that the West Bank (in particular) is "disputed" or "unallocated" rather than the occupied territory of a nation that is party to the Geneva Convention."

Israel's argument against the applicability of the convention was formulated by Meir Shamgar and is based on an interpretation of Article 2, which reads:

"In addition to the provisions which shall be implemented in peace-time, the present Convention shall apply to all cases of declared war or of any other armed conflict which may arise between two or more of the High Contracting Parties, even if the state of war is not recognized by one of them.

The Convention shall also apply to all cases of partial or total occupation of the territory of a High Contracting Party, even if the said occupation meets with no armed resistance."

The government's argument (first made by Moshe Dayan in a speech to the UN in 1977) is that neither the West Bank nor Gaza were the territory of a "High Contracting Power" at the time they were occupied by Israel and that therefore the Convention does not apply.

In 1993 the UN Security Council "acting under Chapter VII of the Charter on the United Nations" approved a report by the Secretary General which concluded beyond doubt that the law applicable in armed conflict as embodied in the Geneva Conventions of 12 August 1949 and the Hague Convention (IV) of 18 October 1907 had become part of international customary law. Breaches of the principles contained in the conventions were subsequently placed within the competence of international criminal tribunals, including International Criminal Tribunal for the former Yugoslavia and International Criminal Court.

Gershom Gorenberg has written that the Israeli government knew at the outset that it was violating the Geneva Convention by creating civilian settlements in the territories under IDF administration. He explained that as the legal counsel of the Foreign Ministry, Theodor Meron was the Israeli government's expert on international law. On 16 September 1967 Meron wrote a top secret memo to Mr. Adi Yafeh, Political Secretary of the Prime Minister regarding "Settlement in the Administered Territories" which said "My conclusion is that civilian settlement in the Administered territories contravenes the explicit provisions of the Fourth Geneva Convention." Moshe Dayan authored a secret memo in 1968 proposing massive settlement in the territories which said "Settling Israelis in administered territory, as is known, contravenes international conventions, but there is nothing essentially new about that".

Israel's positions have not been accepted by the International Committee of the Red Cross, nor has it been endorsed by the other High Contracting Parties to the Fourth Geneva Convention. Article 1 of the Convention states that "The High Contracting Parties undertake to respect and to ensure respect for the present Convention in all circumstances" (emphasis added).

On 15 July 1999 a conference of the High Contracting Parties to the Fourth Geneva Convention met at the United Nations headquarters in Geneva. It ruled that the Convention did apply in the Occupied Palestinian Territory, including Jerusalem. In 2001, at a one-day conference of High Contracting Parties, 114 countries adopted a three-page declaration re-affirming that the terms of the Convention applied to the Palestinian territories.

In August 2004 an Israeli justice ministry team set up by Attorney General Menachem Mazuz to study the ramifications of a ruling by the World Court recommended that the Israeli government should consider applying the Fourth Geneva Convention to the West Bank and Gaza.

Israel argues that it is not in violation of it. Firstly, Israel argues that the article was created in the context of World War II only.

Secondly, it is only intended to cover forcible transfers and to protect the local population from displacement. Article 49(1)of the Convention specifically covers "[i]ndividual or mass forcible transfers" whereas the Israelis who live in the settlements have moved there voluntarily, and argue that settlements are not intended to, nor have ever resulted in, the displacement of Palestinians from the area. However, Article 49(6) also prohibits Israel to 'transfer parts of its own civilian population into the territory it occupies', which would cover the Israeli settlements.

Thirdly, Israel claims that some of the settlers have returned to areas where Jewish settlements existed before 1948 (such as Gush Etzion) and therefore it is an entirely different issue.

Fourthly, Israel claims that the Geneva Convention only applies in the absence of an operative peace agreement and between two powers accepting the convention. Since the Oslo Accords leave the issue of settlements to be negotiated later, proponents of this view argue that the Palestinians accepted the temporary presence of Israeli settlements pending further negotiation, and that there is no basis for declaring them illegal.

== Unilateral withdrawal from the Gaza Strip ==
Israel disengaged from the Gaza Strip in September 2005, removing all its settlements and military forces, but remaining in control of Gaza's airspace and territorial waters. It relinquished control of the Rafah crossing between Gaza and Egypt, until it took back control in May 2024, during the Gaza war.

== See also ==
- International law and the Arab–Israeli conflict
- Israeli–Palestinian conflict
- Israeli-occupied territories
- Israeli settlement
- Israeli West Bank barrier
- List of United Nations Security Council Resolutions 401 to 500 (1976–1982)
- Palestinian territories
- Jordanian annexation of the West Bank
- Status of territories captured by Israel
