= United Nations Security Council Resolution 259 =

UN Security Council Resolution 259
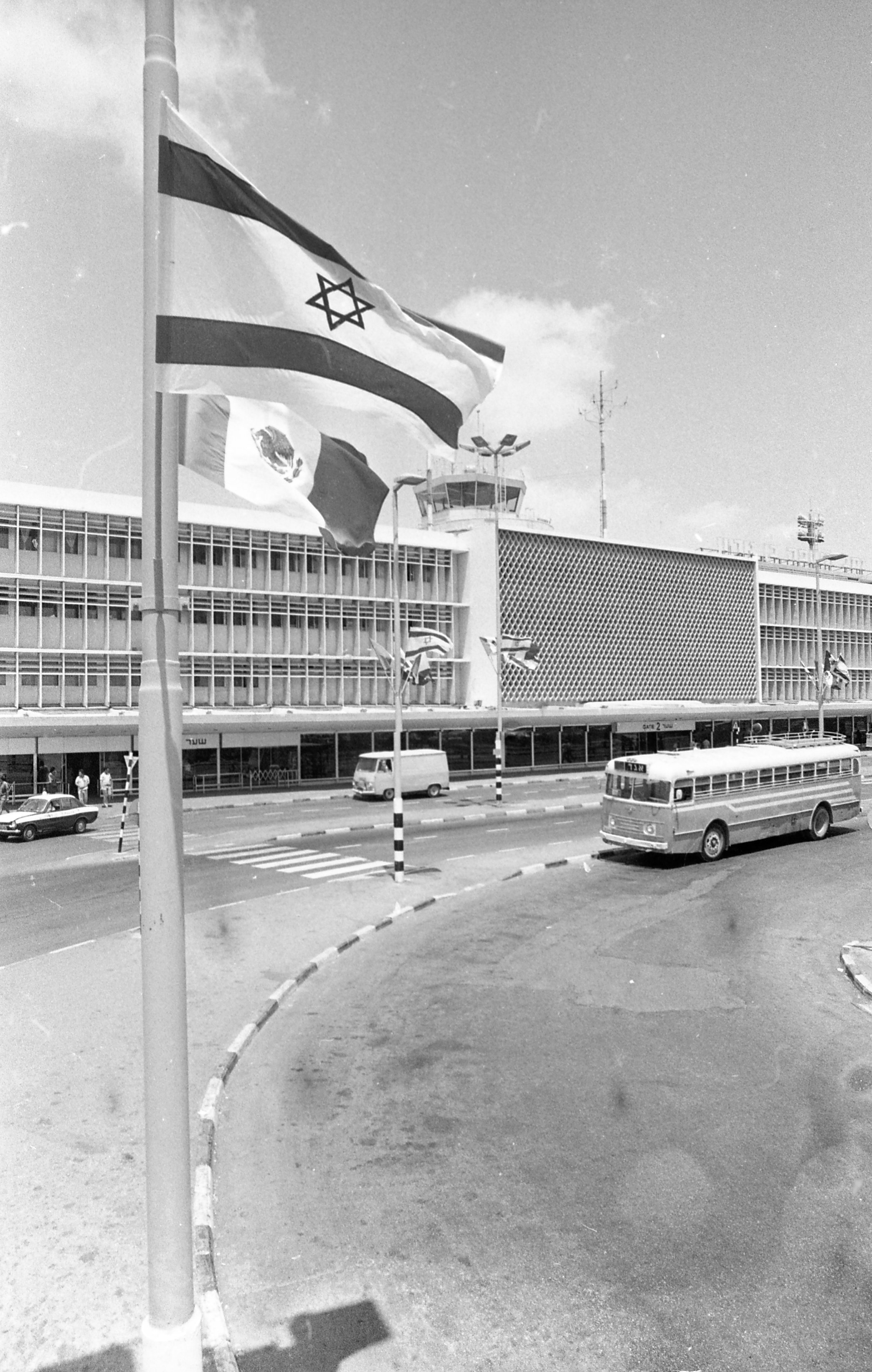
- Israel flag
- Date: September 27 1968
- Meeting no.: 1454
- Code: S/RES/259 (Document)
- Subject: The situation in the Middle East
- Voting summary: 12 voted for; None voted against; 3 abstained
- Result: Adopted

Security Council composition
- Permanent members: China; France; Soviet Union; United Kingdom; United States
- Non-permanent members: Algeria; Brazil; Canada; Denmark; Ethiopia; Hungary; India; Pakistan; Paraguay; Senegal

United Nations Security Council Resolution 259, adopted on September 27, 1968, concerned with the welfare of the inhabitants of the Arab territories then occupied by Israel after the Six-Day War, the Council requested the Secretary-General send a Special Representative to report on the implementation of resolution 237. The Council requested that Israel receive and co-operate with the Special Representative and that the Secretary-General should be afforded all co-operation in order to implement the present resolution.

The resolution was passed with 12 votes to none; Canada, Denmark and the United States abstained.

== See also ==
- Arab–Israeli conflict
- List of United Nations Security Council Resolutions 201 to 300 (1965–1971)
