= United Nations Security Council Resolution 938 =

UN Security Council Resolution 938
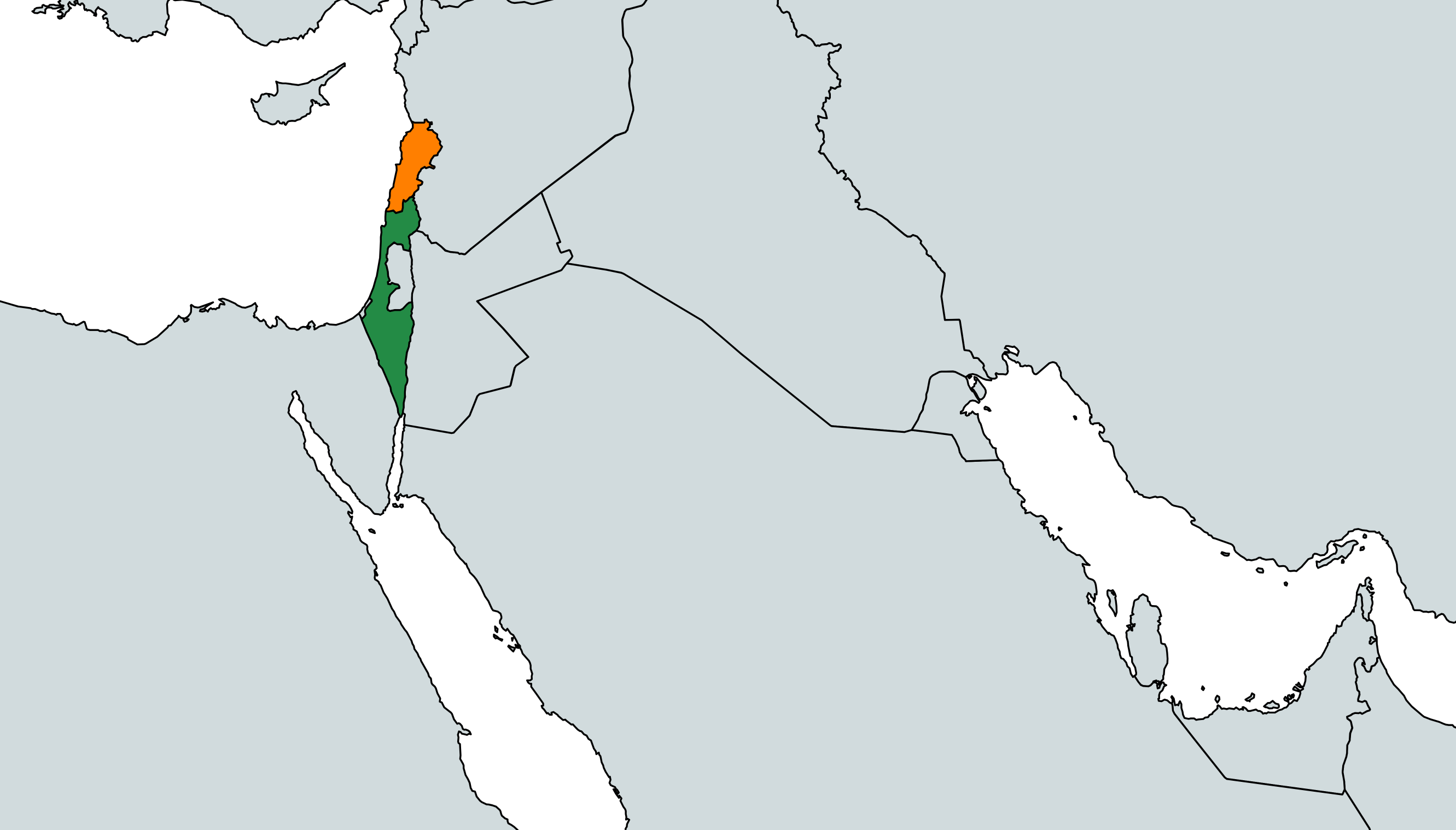
- Israel (blue) and Lebanon (red)
- Date: 28 July 1994
- Meeting no.: 3,409
- Code: S/RES/938 (Document)
- Subject: South Lebanon conflict (1985–2000)
- Voting summary: 14 voted for; None voted against; None abstained
- Result: Adopted

Security Council composition
- Permanent members: China; France; Russia; United Kingdom; United States
- Non-permanent members: Argentina; Brazil; Czech Republic; Djibouti; New Zealand; Nigeria; Oman; Pakistan; Rwanda; Spain

United Nations Security Council resolution 938, adopted on 28 July 1994, after recalling previous resolutions on Israel and Lebanon including 501 (1982), 508 (1982), 509 (1982) and 520 (1982) as well as studying the report by the Secretary-General Boutros Boutros-Ghali on the United Nations Interim Force in Lebanon (UNIFIL) approved in 426 (1978), the Council decided to extend the mandate of UNIFIL for a further six months until 31 January 1995.

The Council then reemphasised the mandate of the Force and requested the Secretary-General Boutros Boutros-Ghali to report back on the progress made with regard to the implementation of resolutions 425 (1978) and 426 (1978).

Resolution 938 was adopted by 14 votes to none; Rwanda was absent from the meeting.

== See also ==
- List of United Nations Security Council Resolutions 901 to 1000 (1994–1995)
- South Lebanon conflict (1985–2000)
