= United Nations Security Council Resolution 1068 =

UN Security Council Resolution 1068
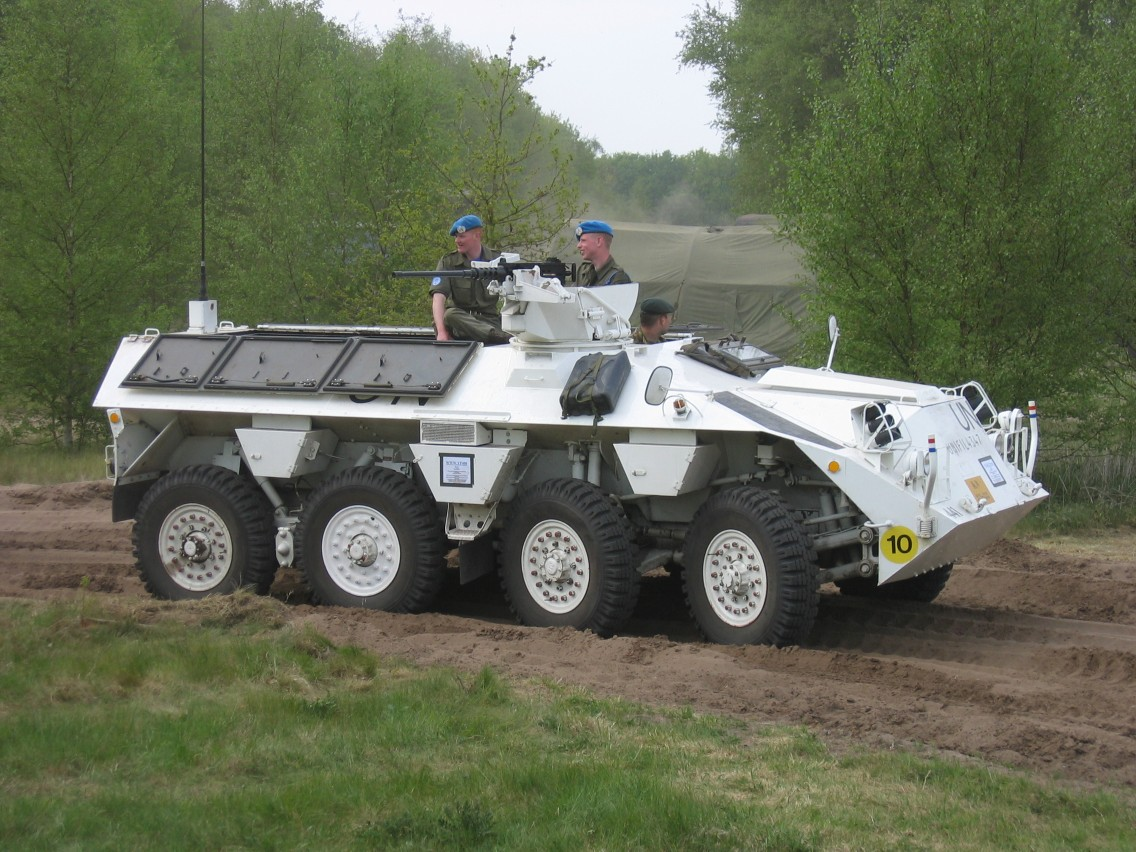
- UNIFIL units
- Date: 30 July 1996
- Meeting no.: 3,685
- Code: S/RES/1068 (Document)
- Subject: The situation in the Middle East
- Voting summary: 15 voted for; None voted against; None abstained
- Result: Adopted

Security Council composition
- Permanent members: China; France; Russia; United Kingdom; United States
- Non-permanent members: Botswana; Chile; Egypt; Guinea-Bissau; Germany; Honduras; Indonesia; Italy; South Korea; Poland

United Nations Security Council resolution 1068, adopted unanimously on 30 July 1996, after recalling previous resolutions on Israel and Lebanon including 501 (1982), 508 (1982), 509 (1982) and 520 (1982) as well as studying the report by the Secretary-General Boutros Boutros-Ghali on the United Nations Interim Force in Lebanon (UNIFIL) approved in 426 (1978), the Council decided to extend the mandate of UNIFIL for a further six months until 31 January 1997.

The Council then reemphasised the mandate of the Force and requested the Secretary-General to continue negotiations with the Government of Lebanon and other parties concerned with regard to the implementation of resolutions 425 (1978) and 426 (1978) and report thereon.

The completion of streamlining measures concerning UNIFIL was welcomed and further savings were encouraged, but noting that the operational capacity of the Force should not be affected.

== See also ==
- List of United Nations Security Council Resolutions 1001 to 1100 (1995–1997)
- South Lebanon conflict (1985–2000)
