= United Nations Security Council Resolution 59 =

UN Security Council Resolution 59
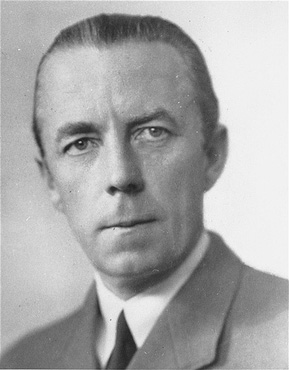
- Folke Bernadotte
- Date: October 20 1948
- Meeting no.: 367
- Code: S/1045 (Document)
- Subject: The Palestine Question
- Result: Adopted

Security Council composition
- Permanent members: China; France; Soviet Union; United Kingdom; United States
- Non-permanent members: Argentina; Belgium; Canada; Colombia; Syria; Ukrainian SSR

United Nations Security Council Resolution 59, adopted on October 19, 1948, concern that the Provisional government of Israel had yet to submit a report to the Council regarding the progress of the investigation into the assassinations of United Nations Mediator Count Folke Bernadotte and Observer Colonel Andre Serot. The Council requested the Israeli Government submit an account of the progress made in the investigation and to indicate therein the measures taken with regard to negligence on the part of officials or other factors affecting the crime.

The Resolution reminded the Governments and authorities concerned of their obligations to live up to the goals and responsibilities established in United Nations Security Council Resolution 54 and United Nations Security Council Resolution 56. The Council charged the Governments and authorities to allow accredited UN observers ready access to all places where their duties might require them to go, to simplify the procedures on UN aircraft then in effect, to co-operate fully with the truce supervision personnel, to implement instructions to the commanders in the field all agreements entered into through the offices of the Mediator and to take reasonable measures to ensure the safety of all truce supervision personnel and their equipment.

The President of the Council announced the resolution had passed in the absence of any objection.

== See also ==
- List of United Nations Security Council Resolutions 1 to 100 (1946–1953)
