= United Nations Security Council Resolution 452 =

UN Security Council Resolution 452
- Middle East
- Date: 20 July 1979
- Meeting no.: 2,159
- Code: S/RES/452 (Document)
- Subject: Territories occupied by Israel
- Voting summary: 14 voted for; None voted against; 1 abstained
- Result: Adopted

Security Council composition
- Permanent members: China; France; Soviet Union; United Kingdom; United States
- Non-permanent members: Bangladesh; Bolivia; Czechoslovakia; Gabon; Jamaica; Kuwait; Nigeria; Norway; Portugal; Zambia

United Nations Security Council Resolution 452, adopted on 20 July 1979, addressed the issue of the Israeli settlements in Jerusalem, the West Bank, Gaza Strip and the Golan Heights, specifically the illegality thereof. It states that "the policy of Israel in establishing settlements in the occupied Arab territories has no legal validity and constitutes a violation of the [Fourth] Geneva Convention relative to the Protection of Civilian Persons in Time of War, of 12 August 1949" and "calls upon the Government and people of Israel to cease, on an urgent basis, the establishment, construction and planning of settlements in the Arab territories occupied since 1967, including Jerusalem."

The resolution was adopted by 14 votes to none, with 1 abstention (United States).

The resolution also noted the "lack of cooperation" shown by Israel to the Security Council Commission established under Security Council resolution 446 in March 1979, paragraph 4, and drew attention to the "grave consequences" of the settlements policy for reaching a potential "peaceful solution in the Middle East".

== See also ==
- Israeli–Palestinian conflict
- List of United Nations Security Council Resolutions 401 to 500 (1976–1982)
- Geneva Convention relative to the Protection of Civilian Persons in Time of War
