= United Nations Security Council Resolution 803 =

UN Security Council Resolution 803
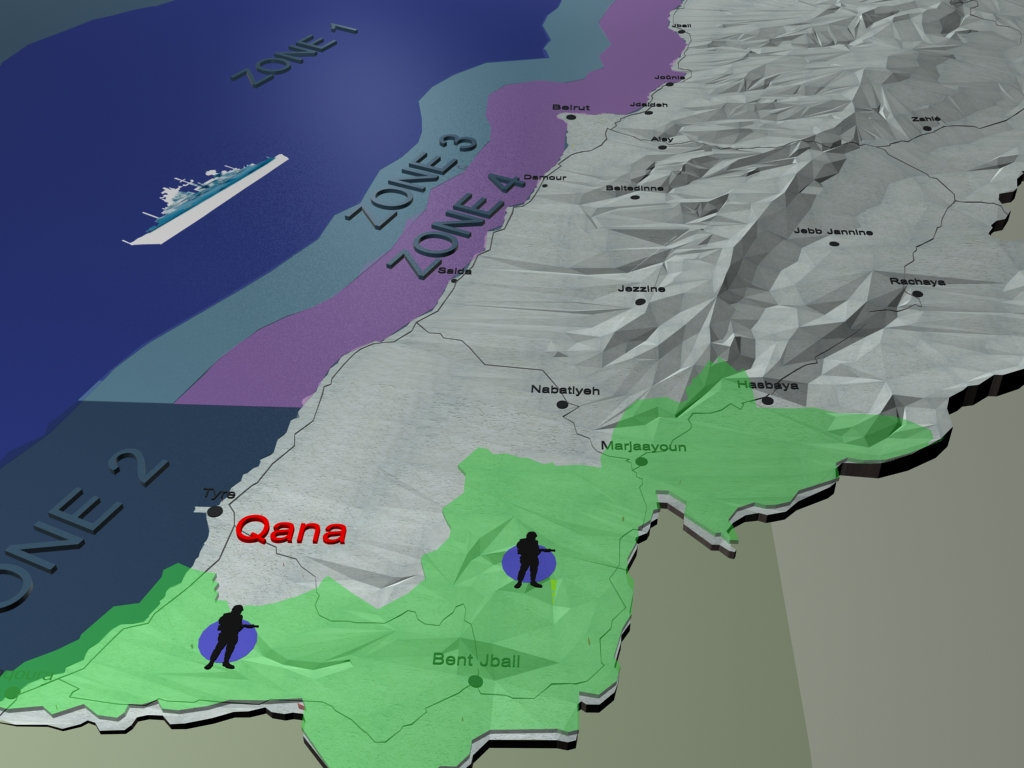
- UNIFIL area of operation
- Date: 28 January 1993
- Meeting no.: 3,167
- Code: S/RES/803 (Document)
- Subject: Israel–Lebanon
- Voting summary: 15 voted for; None voted against; None abstained
- Result: Adopted

Security Council composition
- Permanent members: China; France; Russia; United Kingdom; United States
- Non-permanent members: Brazil; Cape Verde; Djibouti; Hungary; Japan; Morocco; New Zealand; Pakistan; Spain; Venezuela

United Nations Security Council resolution 803, adopted unanimously on 28 January 1993, after recalling previous resolutions on the topic including 501 (1982), 508 (1982), 509 (1982) and 520 (1982) as well as studying the report by the Secretary-General on the United Nations Interim Force in Lebanon (UNIFIL) approved in 426 (1978), the Council decided to extend the mandate of UNIFIL for a further six months until 31 July 1993.

The Council then reemphasised the mandate of the Force and requested the Secretary-General to report back on the progress made with regard to the implementation of resolutions 425 (1978) and 426 (1978).

== See also ==
- List of United Nations Security Council Resolutions 801 to 900 (1993–1994)
- South Lebanon conflict (1985–2000)
