= United Nations Security Council Resolution 317 =

UN Security Council Resolution 317
- Lebanon flag
- Date: 21 July 1972
- Meeting no.: 1,653
- Code: S/RES/317 (Document)
- Subject: The situation in the Middle East
- Voting summary: 14 voted for; None voted against; 1 abstained
- Result: Adopted

Security Council composition
- Permanent members: China; France; Soviet Union; United Kingdom; United States
- Non-permanent members: Argentina; Belgium; Guinea; India; Italy; Japan; Panama; Somalia; Sudan; Yugoslavia

United Nations Security Council Resolution 317, adopted on July 21, 1972, following up on Resolution 316 the Council deplored the fact that despite its efforts Syrian and Lebanese military personnel abducted by Israeli armed forces from Lebanese territory on June 21 had not been released. The Council requested the President of the Security Council and the Secretary-General make renewed efforts to implement the resolution and called upon Israel to return the Syrian and Lebanese personnel without delay.

The resolution was passed with 14 votes; the United States abstained from voting.

== See also ==
- Israeli–Lebanese conflict
- List of United Nations Security Council Resolutions 301 to 400 (1971–1976)
