= United Nations Security Council Resolution 1322 =

UN Security Council Resolution 1322
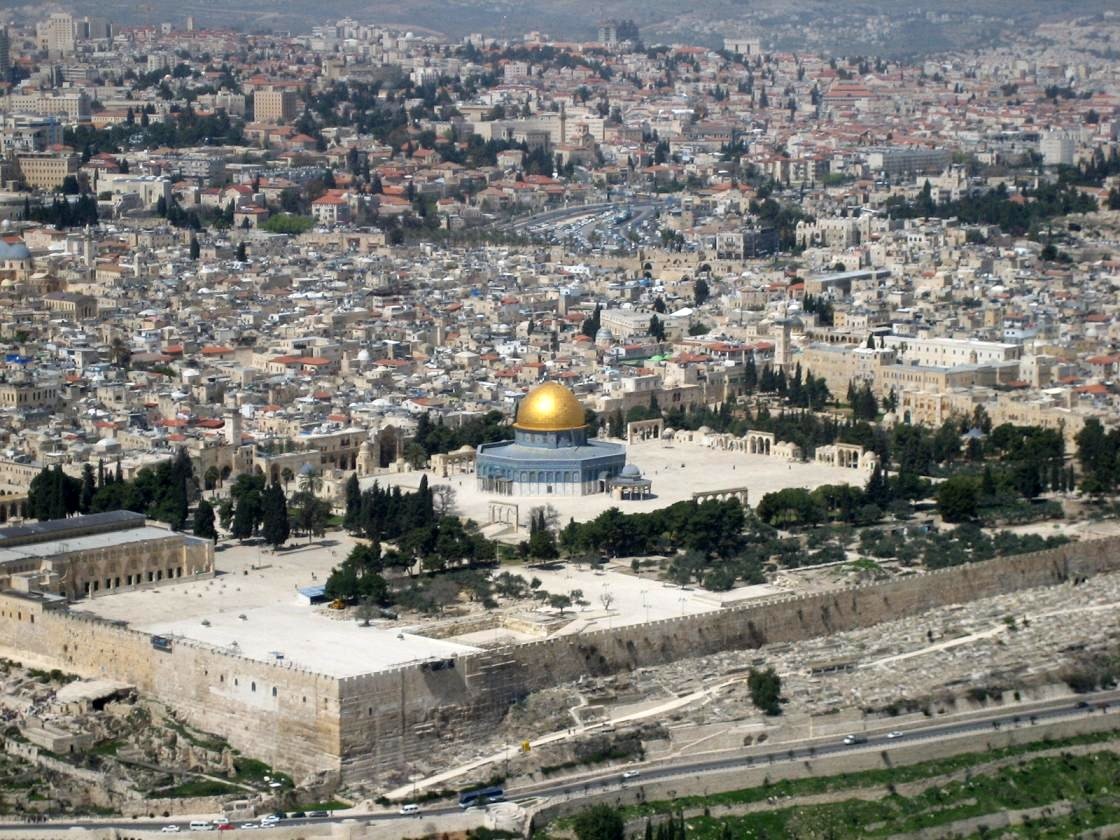
- Temple Mount
- Date: 7 October 2000
- Meeting no.: 4,205
- Code: S/RES/1322 (Document)
- Subject: The situation in the Middle East, including the Palestinian question
- Voting summary: 14 voted for; None voted against; 1 abstained
- Result: Adopted

Security Council composition
- Permanent members: China; France; Russia; United Kingdom; United States
- Non-permanent members: Argentina; Bangladesh; Canada; Jamaica; Malaysia; Mali; Namibia; Netherlands; Tunisia; Ukraine

In United Nations Security Council resolution 1322, adopted on 7 October 2000, after recalling resolutions 476 (1980), 478 (1980), 672 (1990) and 1073 (1996), the Council deplored the visit by Ariel Sharon to the Temple Mount (referred to in the Resolution by its Arab name Al-Haram Al-Sharif) and the subsequent violence which, according to the Resolution, had resulted in the deaths of over 80 Palestinians. The Resolution did not condemn or mention reported Israeli deaths, although it did deplore what it described as "many other casualties."

The Security Council reaffirmed that a settlement of the conflict must be based on resolutions 242 (1967) and 338 (1973), which called for peace based on negotiations between the Israeli and Arab sides. In this regard, it supported the Israeli-Palestinian peace process and reaffirmed the need for the full respect of the Holy Places of Jerusalem by all.

The resolution labeled Sharon's visit to the Temple Mount a "provocation," and it deplored the visit as well as subsequent violence there and throughout the other Israeli-occupied territories, particularly the use of force against Palestinians. The violence was the worst in years, and marked the beginning of the Second Intifada. The Council called for an immediate cessation of hostilities and return to negotiations and it called upon Israel to abide by its responsibilities under the Fourth Geneva Convention concerning the protection of civilians in war. It stressed the importance of an objective inquiry into the recent events with the aim of preventing further repetition. Finally, the Secretary-General Kofi Annan was required to keep the Council informed on developments.

The resolution was sponsored by Malaysia and supported by several European countries. The original version of the resolution sought a strong condemnation of Israel. The United States, which abstained, threatened to veto this version, and the language was modified to remove mention of Israel by name.

== See also ==
- Arab–Israeli conflict
- Israeli–Palestinian conflict
- List of United Nations Security Council Resolutions 1301 to 1400 (2000–2002)
- First Intifada
- Second Intifada
