= United Nations Security Council Resolution 248 =

UN Security Council Resolution 248
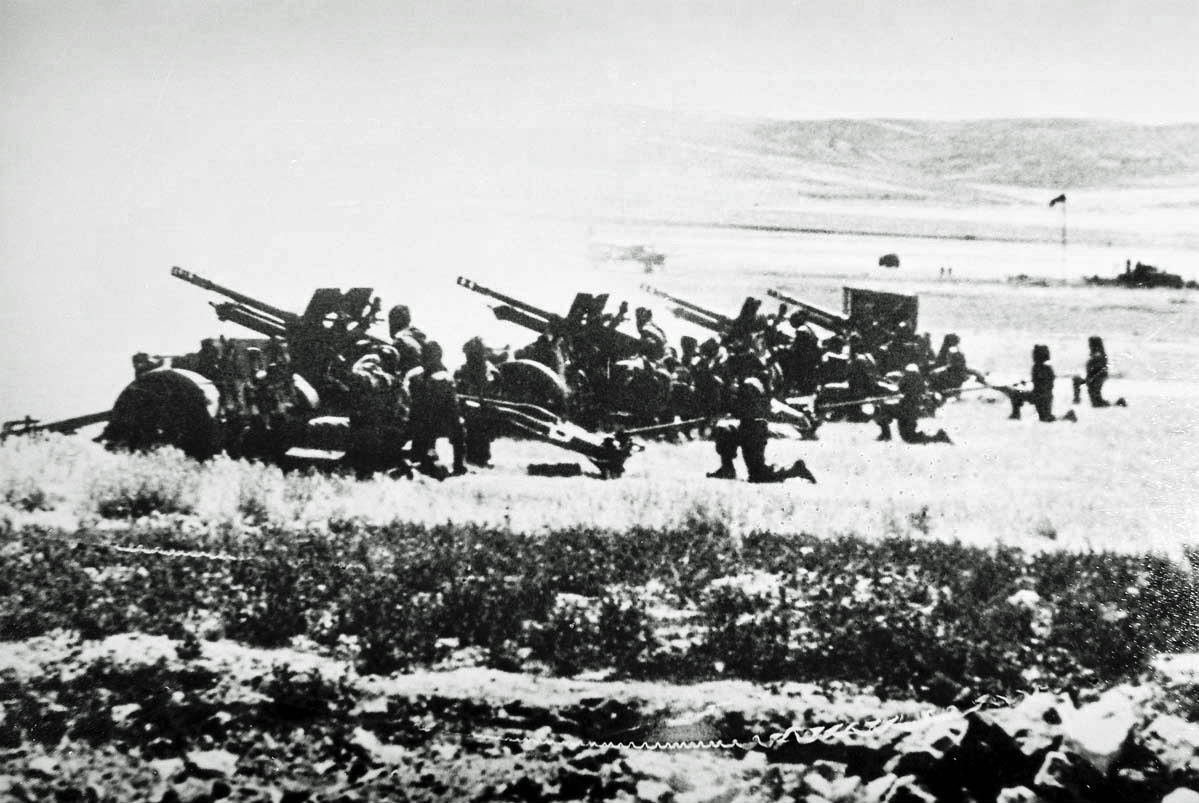
- Jordanian artillery battery at Karameh
- Date: March 24 1968
- Meeting no.: 1407
- Code: S/RES/248 (Document)
- Subject: The Situation in the Middle East
- Voting summary: 15 voted for; None voted against; None abstained
- Result: Adopted

Security Council composition
- Permanent members: China; France; Soviet Union; United Kingdom; United States
- Non-permanent members: Algeria; Brazil; Canada; Denmark; Ethiopia; Hungary; India; Pakistan; Paraguay; Senegal

United Nations Security Council Resolution 248, adopted on March 24, 1968, after receiving letters from Jordan and Israel as well as supplementary information from the Chief of Staff of the United Nations Truce Supervision Organization, the Council reaffirmed its previous resolutions and condemned the Battle of Karameh military action launched by Israel in flagrant violation of the UN Charter. The Council deplored all violent incidents in violation of the cease-fire and called upon Israel to desist from acts and activities in contravention of resolution 237.

== See also ==
- Battle of Karameh
- Arab–Israeli conflict
- List of United Nations Security Council Resolutions 201 to 300 (1965–1971)
