= United Nations Security Council Resolution 337 =

UN Security Council Resolution 337
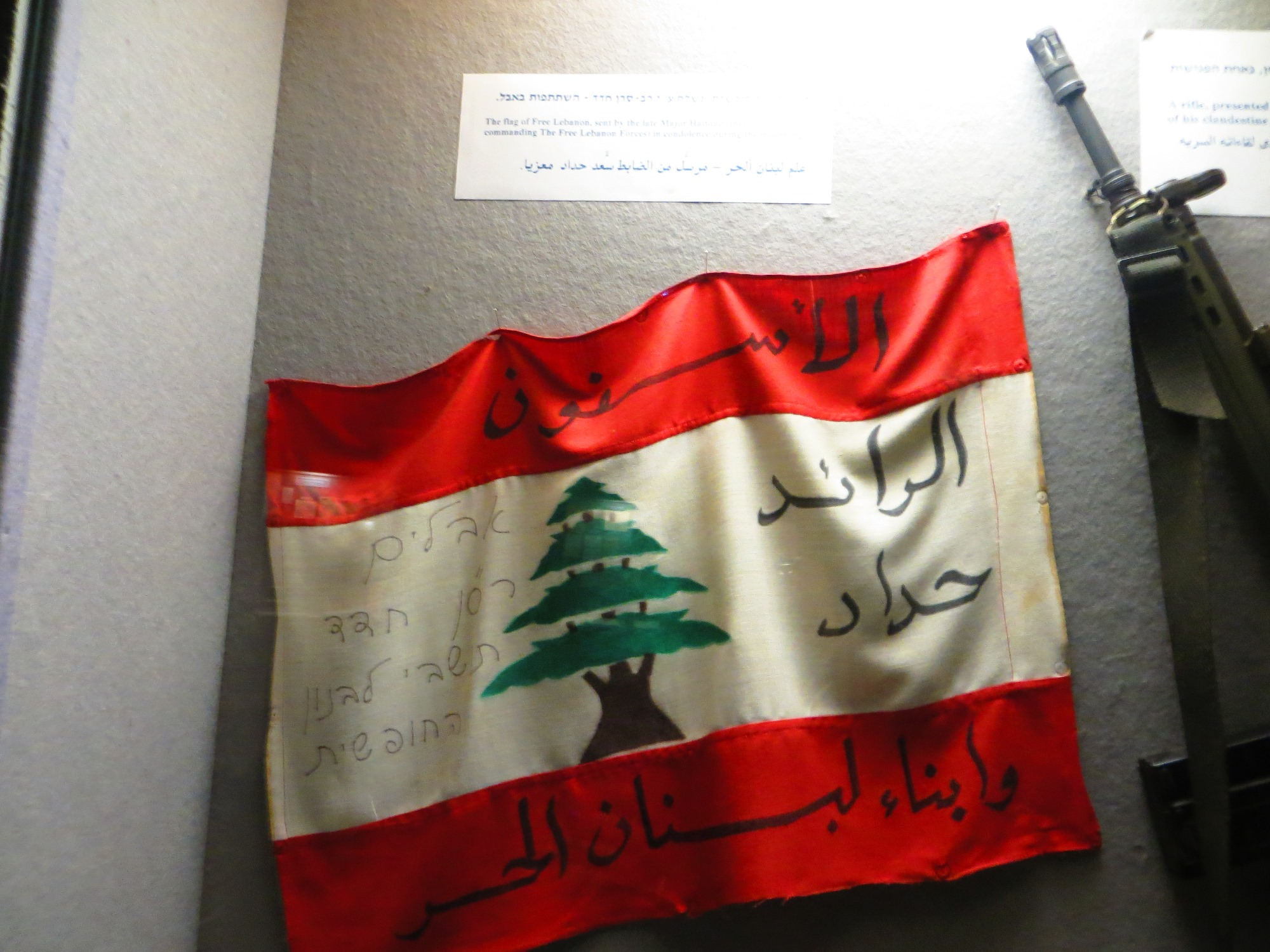
- Lebanon flag
- Date: 15 August 1973
- Meeting no.: 1,740
- Code: S/RES/337 (Document)
- Subject: On Seizure of a Lebanese Airliner
- Voting summary: 15 voted for; None voted against; None abstained
- Result: Adopted

Security Council composition
- Permanent members: China; France; Soviet Union; United Kingdom; United States
- Non-permanent members: Australia; Austria; Guinea; India; Indonesia; Kenya; Panama; Peru; Sudan; Yugoslavia

United Nations Security Council Resolution 337, adopted unanimously on August 15, 1973, condemned the state of Israel for forcibly diverting and then seizing a Lebanese airline from Lebanon's airspace. The Council considered these actions a violation of the relevant 1949 Armistice Agreements, the cease-fire resolution of the Security Council of 1967, the provisions of the Charter, the international conventions on civil aviation and the very principles of international law and morality.

The Resolution goes on to call upon the International Civil Aviation Organization to consider adequate measures to safeguard civil aviation and for Israel to desist from any further attacks that would violate Lebanon's sovereignty and territorial civil aviation. The Council stated that if Israel repeated similar acts they would consider taking adequate steps to enforce their resolutions.

== See also ==
- Israeli–Lebanese conflict
- List of United Nations Security Council Resolutions 301 to 400 (1971–1976)
