= United Nations Security Council Resolution 73 =

UN Security Council Resolution 73
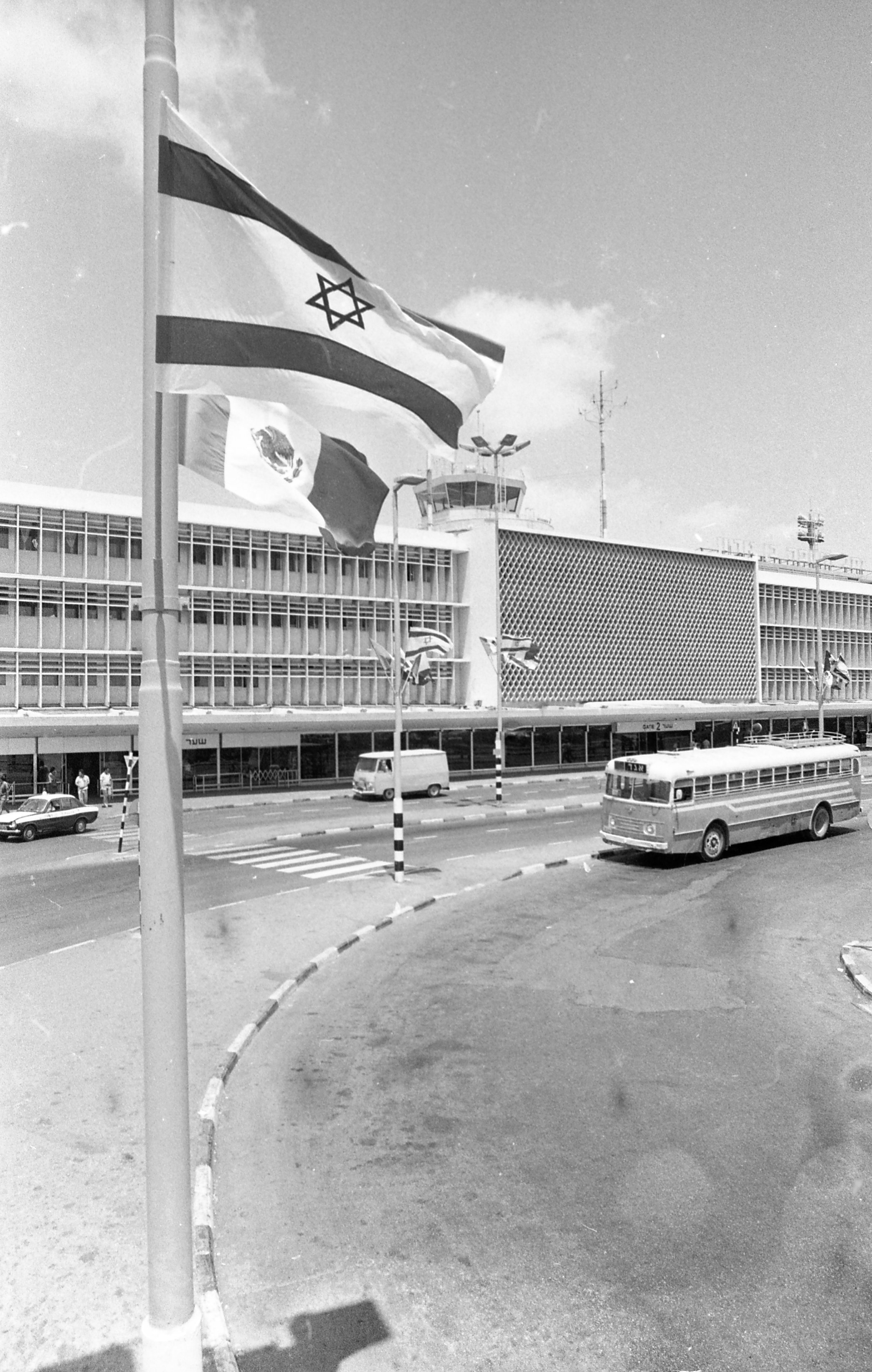
- Israel flag
- Date: August 11 1949
- Meeting no.: 437
- Code: S/1376, II (Document)
- Subject: The Palestine Question
- Voting summary: 9 voted for; None voted against; 2 abstained
- Result: Adopted

Security Council composition
- Permanent members: China; France; Soviet Union; United Kingdom; United States
- Non-permanent members: Argentina; Canada; Cuba; Egypt; Norway; Ukrainian SSR

United Nations Security Council Resolution 73, adopted on August 11, 1949, noted with satisfaction the Armistice Agreements between the parties involved in the 1948 conflict in Palestine and then expressed the hope that a final settlement of all questions outstanding between the parties might be achieved soon. The Resolution went on to relieve the Action Mediator in Palestine, Ralph Bunche, as his duties had been fulfilled, and requested the Secretary-General arrange for the continued service of the personnel of the present Truce Supervision Organization as may be required in observing and maintaining the cease-fires and Armistices. The Resolution also requested that the Chief of Staff of the TSO report to the Council on the observance of the cease-fire.

The resolution was adopted nine votes to none; the Ukrainian SSR and Soviet Union abstained.

== See also ==
- United Nations Security Council Resolution 72
- List of United Nations Security Council Resolutions 1 to 100 (1946–1953)
