= United Nations Security Council Resolution 347 =

UN Security Council Resolution 347
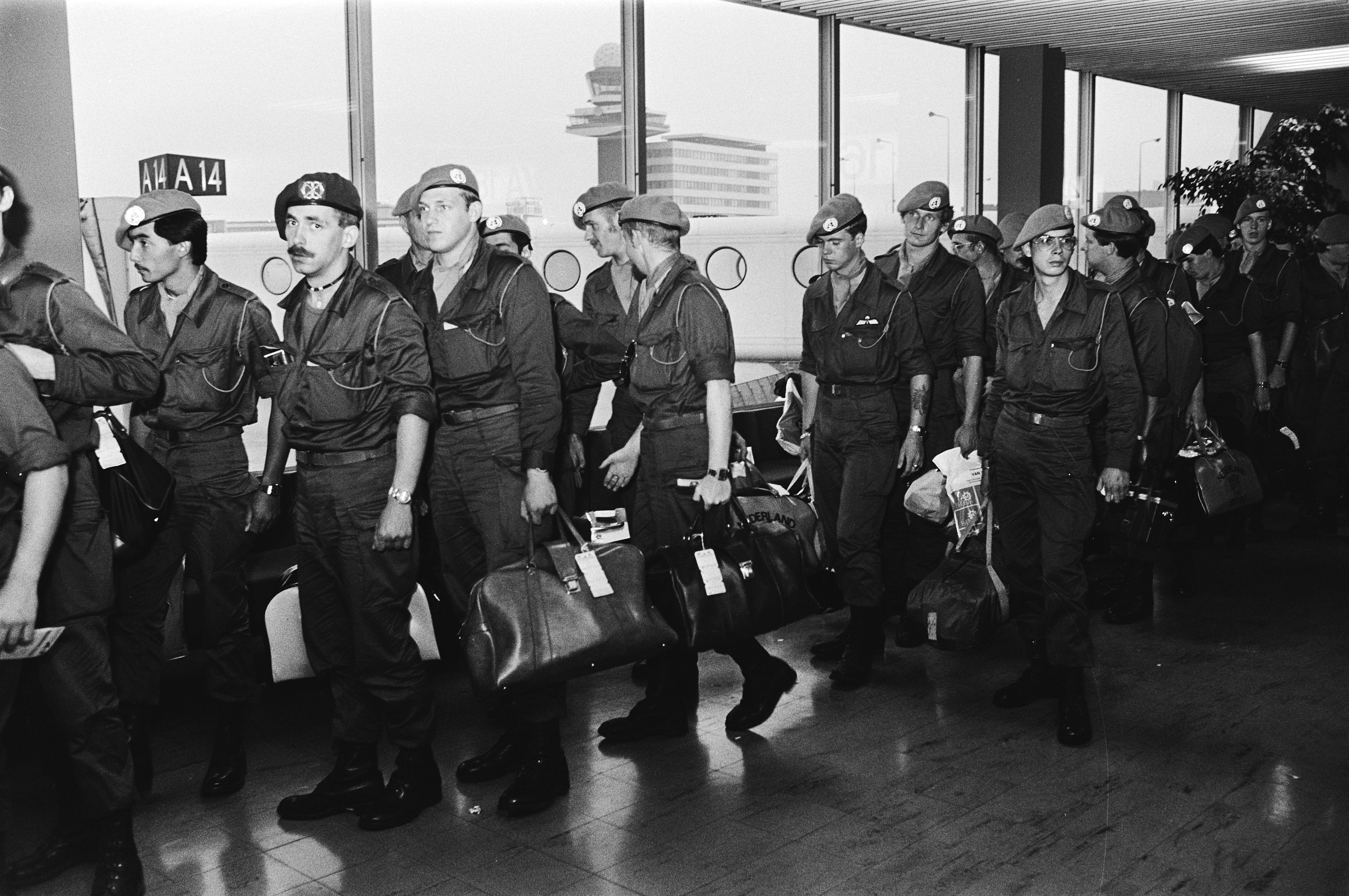
- UN troops
- Date: 24 April 1974
- Meeting no.: 1,769
- Code: S/RES/347 (Document)
- Subject: Israel-Lebanon
- Voting summary: 13 voted for; None voted against; None abstained
- Result: Adopted

Security Council composition
- Permanent members: China; France; Soviet Union; United Kingdom; United States
- Non-permanent members: Australia; Austria; Byelorussian SSR; Cameroon; Costa Rica; Indonesia; Iraq; Kenya; Mauritania; Peru

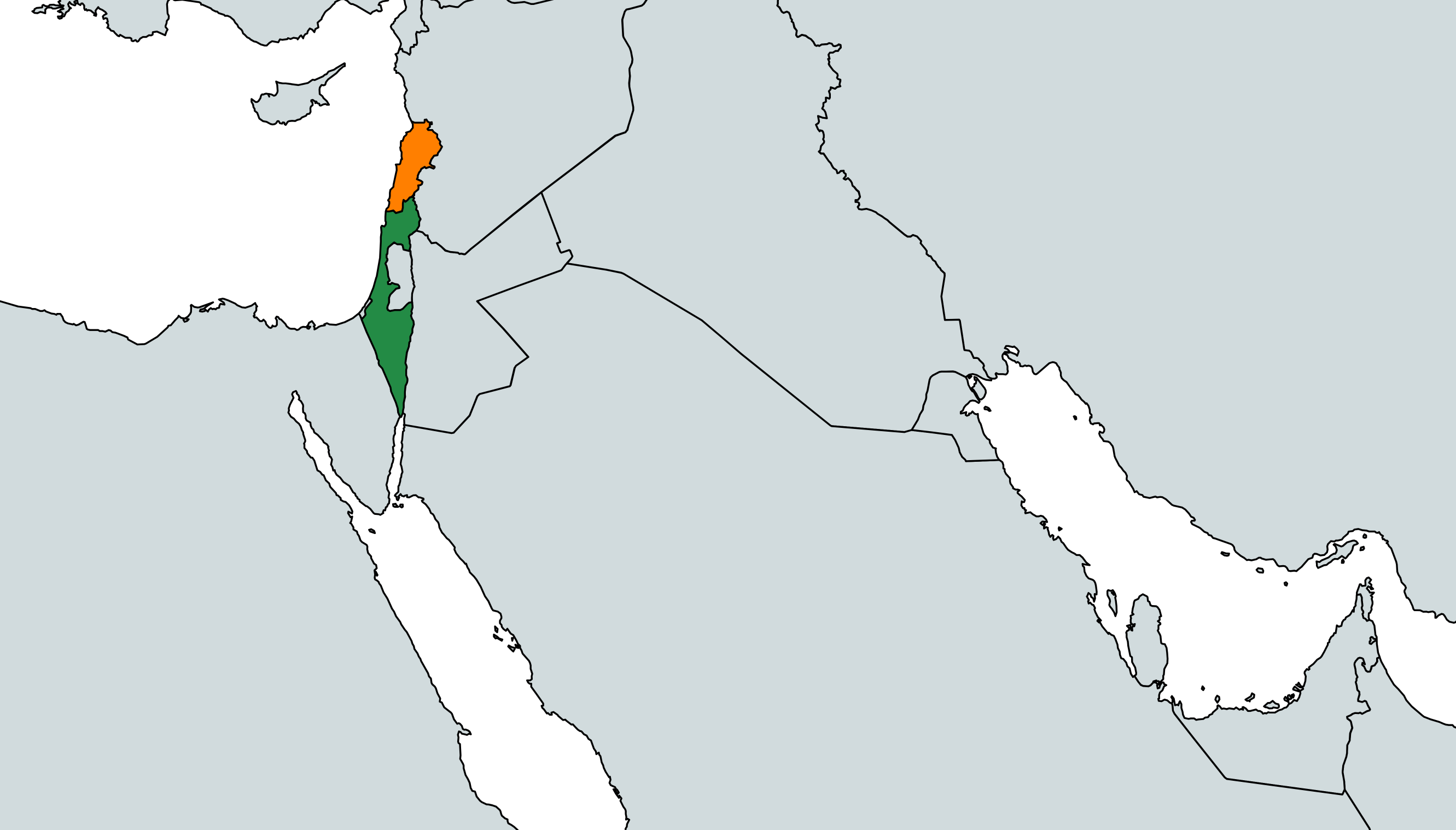
Locations of Israel and Lebanon

United Nations Security Council Resolution 347, adopted on April 24, 1974, concerned that a recent outbreak of violence by Israel would bring war to the Middle East, the Council condemned Israel's violation of Lebanon's territorial integrity and again called upon Israel to refrain from further military action against Lebanon. The Resolution goes on to condemn the loss of civilian life and called upon Israel to respect international law and return to Lebanon the civilians it had kidnapped.

The resolution was adopted by 13 votes to none, while two members, Iraq and the People's Republic of China, did not participate in the voting.

== See also ==
- Israeli–Lebanese conflict
- List of United Nations Security Council Resolutions 301 to 400 (1971–1976)
