= United Nations Security Council Resolution 1073 =

UN Security Council Resolution 1073
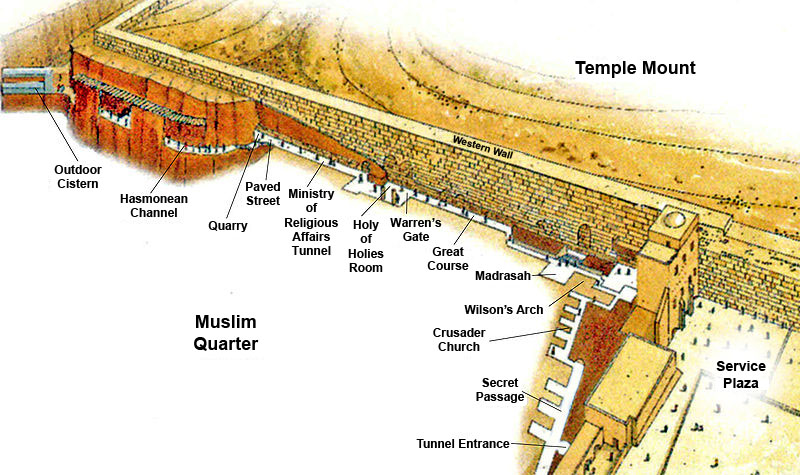
- Western Wall tunnel
- Date: 28 September 1996
- Meeting no.: 3,698
- Code: S/RES/1073 (Document)
- Subject: The situation in the occupied Arab territories
- Voting summary: 14 voted for; None voted against; 1 abstained
- Result: Adopted

Security Council composition
- Permanent members: China; France; Russia; United Kingdom; United States
- Non-permanent members: Botswana; Chile; Egypt; Guinea-Bissau; Germany; Honduras; Indonesia; Italy; South Korea; Poland

United Nations Security Council resolution 1073, adopted on 28 September 1996, after recalling all resolutions on Jerusalem and noting a letter from Saudi Arabia on behalf of the Arab League, the Council called on Israel to cease and reverse all acts which had resulted in aggravation in the region.

== Background ==
On 23 September 1996, Israel opened a tunnel linking the Western Wall with an exit near Temple Mount. The opening provoked rioting, which lasted for five days, in the territories which resulted in the deaths of 14 Israelis and 56 Arabs. A further 300 people were injured.

== Resolution ==
Concern was expressed at the clashes between Palestinians and Israeli army in Jerusalem, Nablus, Ramallah, Bethlehem and the Gaza Strip which resulted in deaths and injuries on both sides. There was also concern for the wider implications on the Middle East peace process as a whole.

A cessation and reversal of all acts by Israel was urged, while the safety of Palestinians was called for and the resumption of negotiations.

Resolution 1073 was adopted by 14 votes to none against, with one abstention from the United States.

== See also ==
- Israeli-occupied territories
- Israeli–Palestinian conflict
- List of United Nations Security Council Resolutions 1001 to 1100 (1995–1997)
- United Nations resolutions concerning Israel
