= United Nations Security Council Resolution 363 =

UN Security Council Resolution 363
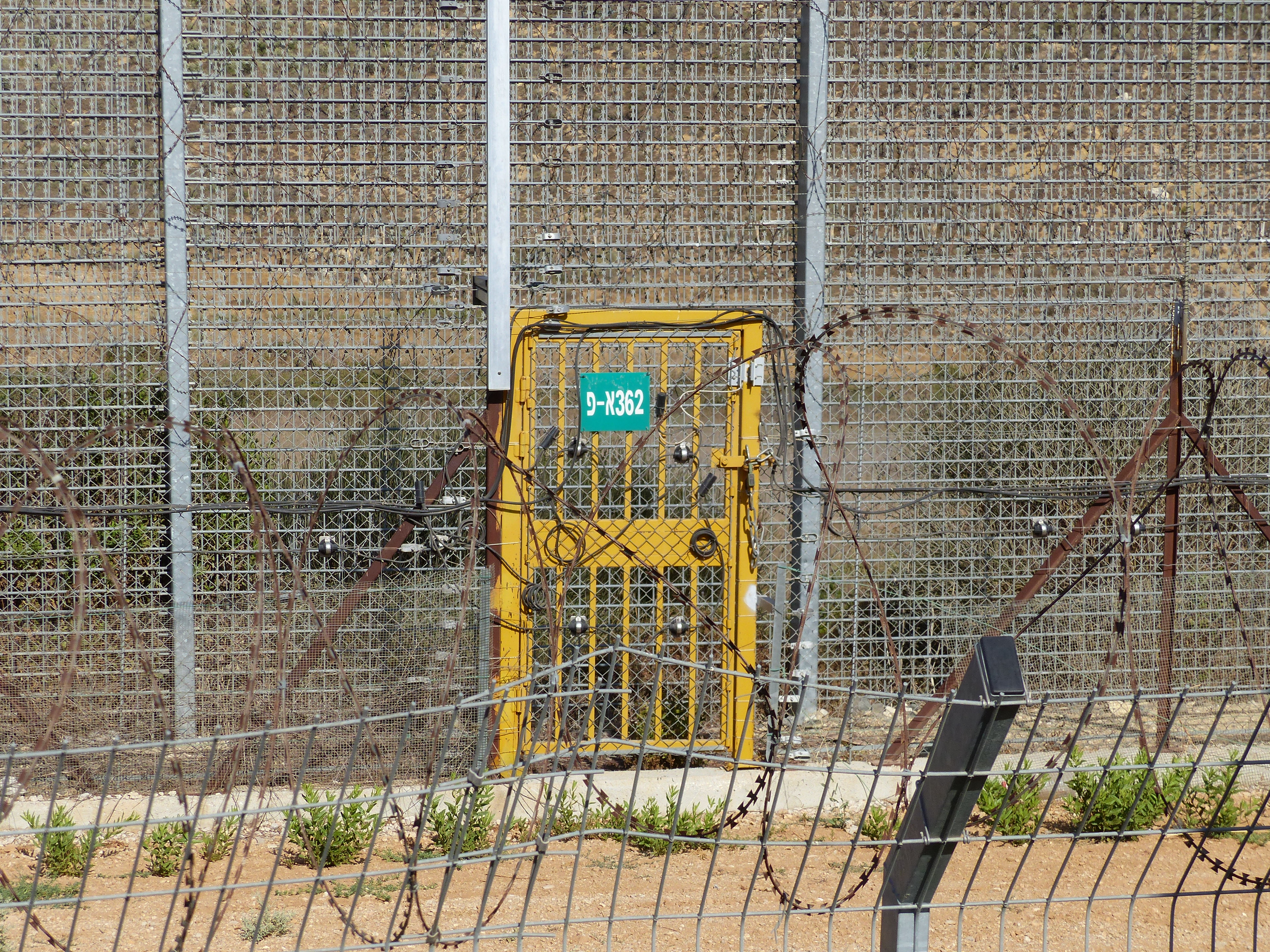
- Syrian border fence
- Date: 29 November 1974
- Meeting no.: 1,809
- Code: S/RES/363 (Document)
- Subject: Israel-Syrian Arab Republic
- Voting summary: 13 voted for; None voted against; None abstained
- Result: Adopted

Security Council composition
- Permanent members: China; France; Soviet Union; United Kingdom; United States
- Non-permanent members: Australia; Austria; Byelorussian SSR; Cameroon; Costa Rica; Indonesia; Iraq; Kenya; Mauritania; Peru

United Nations Security Council Resolution 363, adopted on November 29, 1974, after considering a report by the Secretary-General regarding the United Nations Disengagement Observer Force, the Council noted the efforts made to establish a durable and just peace in the Middle East and expressed its concern over the prevailing state of tension in the area. The Council reaffirmed that the agreements on disengagement of forces were only a step toward peace and called upon all the parties concerned to implement immediately resolution 338, decided to renew the mandate of the Force for another six months and decided that the Secretary-General would submit a report at the end of that period regarding developments in the situation and measures taken to implement resolution 338.

The resolution passed with 13 votes to none, while China and Iraq did not participate in voting.

== See also ==
- Arab–Israeli conflict
- Israel–Syria relations
- List of United Nations Security Council Resolutions 301 to 400 (1971–1976)
- Yom Kippur War
