= United Nations Security Council Resolution 313 =

UN Security Council Resolution 313
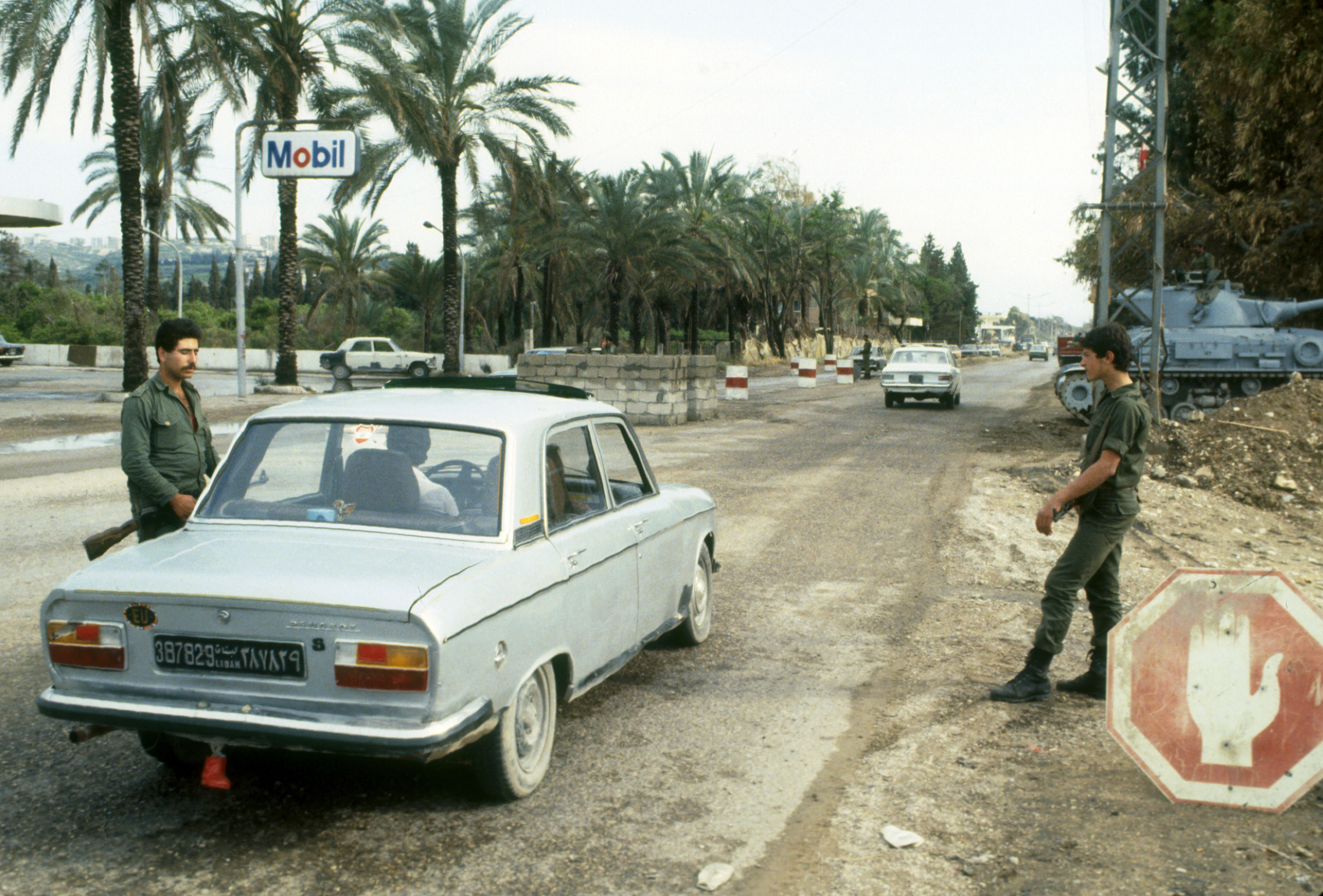
- Lebanese border
- Date: 28 February 1972
- Meeting no.: 1,644
- Code: S/RES/313 (Document)
- Subject: The situation in the Middle East
- Voting summary: 15 voted for; None voted against; None abstained
- Result: Adopted

Security Council composition
- Permanent members: China; France; Soviet Union; United Kingdom; United States
- Non-permanent members: Argentina; Belgium; Guinea; India; Italy; Japan; Panama; Somalia; Sudan; Yugoslavia

United Nations Security Council Resolution 313, adopted on February 28, 1972, demanded that Israel immediately desist from ground and military action against Lebanon and withdraw all its military forces from Lebanese territory.

== See also ==
- Israeli–Lebanese conflict
- List of United Nations Security Council Resolutions 301 to 400 (1971–1976)
