= United Nations Security Council Resolution 258 =

UN Security Council Resolution 258
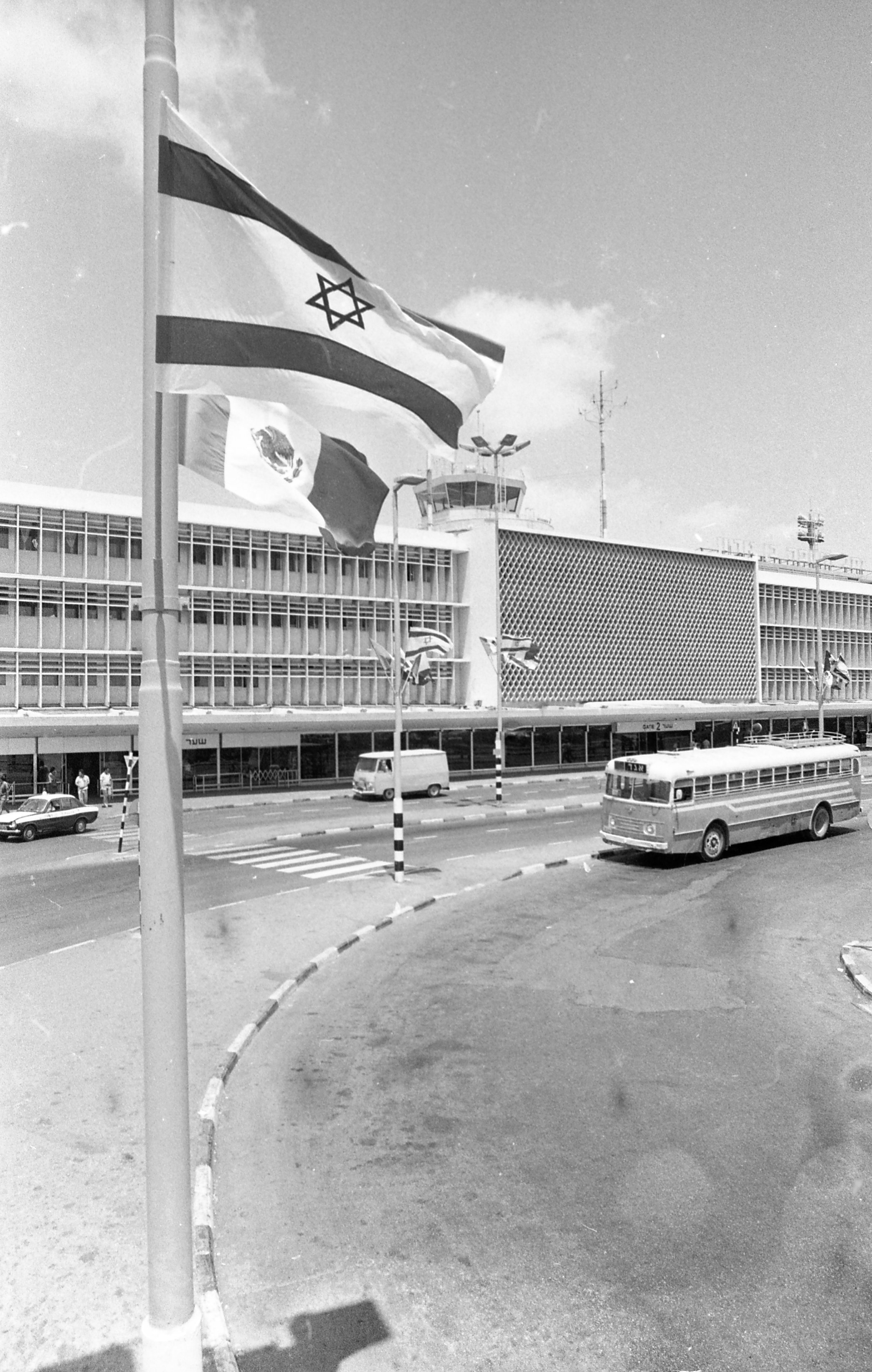
- Israel flag
- Date: September 18 1968
- Meeting no.: 1452
- Code: S/RES/258 (Document)
- Subject: The situation in the Middle East
- Voting summary: 14 voted for; None voted against; 1 abstained
- Result: Adopted

Security Council composition
- Permanent members: China; France; Soviet Union; United Kingdom; United States
- Non-permanent members: Algeria; Brazil; Canada; Denmark; Ethiopia; Hungary; India; Pakistan; Paraguay; Senegal

United Nations Security Council Resolution 258 was adopted on September 18, 1968. Concerned about growing instability in the Middle East, the Council demanded that the cease-fire they ordered be rigorously respected, reaffirmed resolution 242 and urged all parties to extend their fullest co-operation to the Special Representative of the Secretary-General.

The resolution was adopted with 14 votes to none; Algeria abstained.

== See also ==
- Arab–Israeli conflict
- List of United Nations Security Council Resolutions 201 to 300 (1965–1971)
