= United Nations Security Council Resolution 396 =

UN Security Council Resolution 396
- The Middle East
- Date: 22 October 1976
- Meeting no.: 1,964
- Code: S/RES/396 (Document)
- Subject: Egypt-Israel
- Voting summary: 13 voted for; None voted against; None abstained
- Result: Adopted

Security Council composition
- Permanent members: China; France; Soviet Union; United Kingdom; United States
- Non-permanent members: Benin; Guyana; Italy; Japan; Libya; Pakistan; Panama; Romania; Sweden; Tanzania

United Nations Security Council Resolution 396, adopted on October 22, 1976, considered a report by the Secretary-General regarding the United Nations Disengagement Observer Force and noted the discussions the Secretary-General had had with all the concerned parties in the Middle East situation. The Council expressed its concern over the continuing tension in the area and decided:

(a) To renew the mandate of the United Nations Disengagement Observer Force for another year, until October 24, 1977;
(b) To request that the Secretary-General keep the Security Council informed on further developments;
(c) To call upon all parties to immediately implement resolution 338 (1973).

The Council adopted the resolution by 13 votes to none; China and Libya did not participate in the vote.

== See also ==
- Arab–Israeli conflict
- Egypt–Israel relations
- List of United Nations Security Council Resolutions 301 to 400 (1971–1976)
