= United Nations Security Council Resolution 390 =

UN Security Council Resolution 390
- Historical Borders of the Golan Heights
- Date: 28 May 1976
- Meeting no.: 1,923
- Code: S/RES/390 (Document)
- Subject: Israel-Syrian Arab Republic
- Voting summary: 13 voted for; None voted against; None abstained
- Result: Adopted

Security Council composition
- Permanent members: China; France; Soviet Union; United Kingdom; United States
- Non-permanent members: Benin; Guyana; Italy; Japan; Libya; Pakistan; Panama; Romania; Sweden; Tanzania

United Nations Security Council Resolution 390, adopted on May 28, 1976, considered a report by the Secretary-General regarding the United Nations Disengagement Observer Force. The Council noted the efforts made to establish a durable and just peace in the Middle East but expressed its concern over the prevailing state of tension in the area. The Resolution decided:

(a) To call upon the parties concerned to implement immediately Security Council resolution 338 (1973) of 22 October 1973;
(b) To renew the mandate of the United Nations Disengagement Observer Force for another period of six months;
(c) To request the Secretary-General to submit at the end of this period a report on the developments in the situation and the measures taken to implement resolution 338 (1973).

The resolution passed with 13 votes; China and Libya did not participate in voting.

== See also ==
- Arab–Israeli conflict
- Israeli occupation of the Golan Heights
- Israel–Syria relations
- List of United Nations Security Council Resolutions 301 to 400 (1971–1976)
