= United Nations Security Council Resolution 316 =

UN Security Council Resolution 316
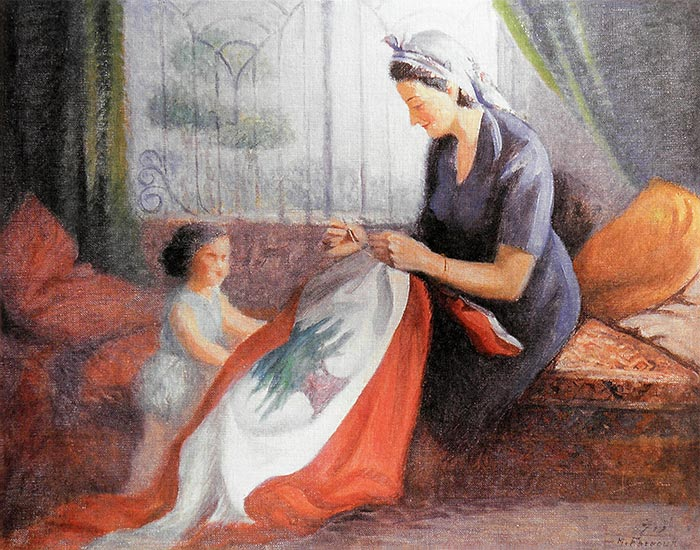
- Lebanon flag
- Date: 26 June 1972
- Meeting no.: 1,650
- Code: S/RES/316 (Document)
- Subject: The situation in the Middle East
- Voting summary: 13 voted for; None voted against; 2 abstained
- Result: Adopted

Security Council composition
- Permanent members: China; France; Soviet Union; United Kingdom; United States
- Non-permanent members: Argentina; Belgium; Guinea; India; Italy; Japan; Panama; Somalia; Sudan; Yugoslavia

United Nations Security Council Resolution 316, adopted on June 26, 1972, after reaffirming previous resolutions on the topic, the Council condemned Israel's "deploring acts of violence" and called upon Israel to abide by the previous resolutions and desist from further violating the sovereignty and territorial integrity of Lebanon. The resolution went on to express the desire that all Lebanese and Syrian military personnel abducted by Israel be released in the shortest time possible and declared that if the above-mentioned steps were not taken the Council would reconvene to consider further action.

The resolution was passed with 13 votes; Panama and the United States abstained from voting. The resolution came in the context of Palestinian insurgency in South Lebanon.

== See also ==
- History of Lebanon
- List of United Nations Security Council Resolutions 301 to 400 (1971–1976)
