= United Nations Security Council Resolution 252 =

UN Security Council Resolution 252
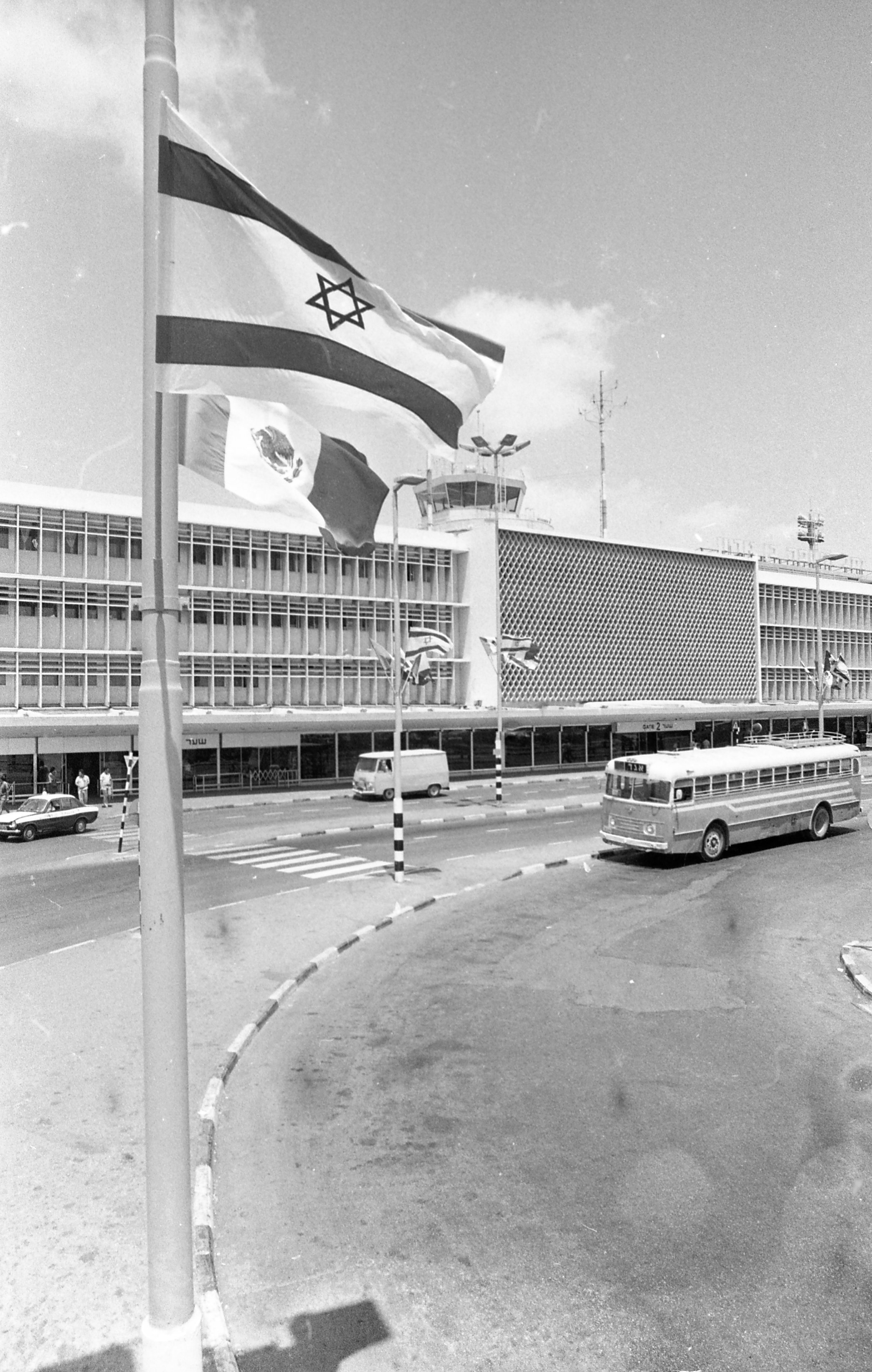
- Israel flag
- Date: May 21 1968
- Meeting no.: 1426
- Code: S/RES/252(1968)
- Subject: The Situation in the Middle East
- Voting summary: 13 voted for; None voted against; 2 abstained
- Result: Adopted

Security Council composition
- Permanent members: China; France; Soviet Union; United Kingdom; United States
- Non-permanent members: Algeria; Brazil; Canada; Denmark; Ethiopia; Hungary; India; Pakistan; Paraguay; Senegal

United Nations Security Council resolution 252, adopted on 21 May 1968, after a letter from the Permanent Representative of Jordan, hearing statements from Israel and Jordan, and noting Israel's "further actions and measures in contravention" of General Assembly resolutions, the Council reaffirmed that the acquisition of territory by military conquest is inadmissible and deplored the failure of Israel to comply with the General Assembly resolutions. The Council considered all legislative and administrative measure and action which tend to change the legal status of Jerusalem are invalid and cannot change that status and urgently called upon Israel to rescind all such measures already taken and to desist forthwith from taking any further action which tends to change the status of Jerusalem.

The resolution passed with 13 votes to none; Canada and the United States abstained.

== See also ==
- Arab–Israeli conflict
- List of United Nations Security Council Resolutions 201 to 300 (1965–1971)
