= United Nations Security Council Resolution 56 =

UN Security Council Resolution 56
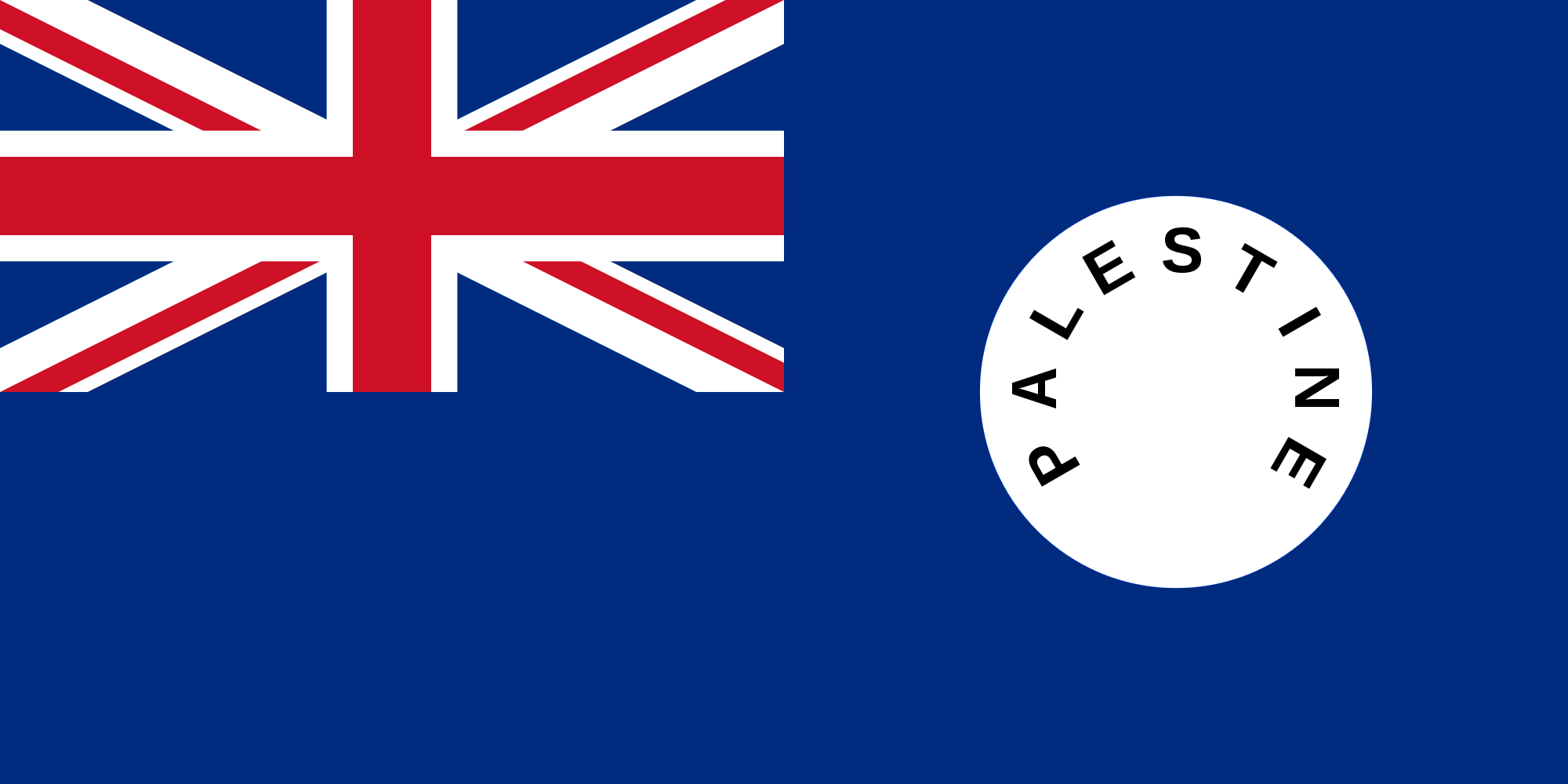
- Palestine flag
- Date: August 19 1948
- Meeting no.: 354
- Code: S/983 (Document)
- Subject: The Palestine Question
- Result: Adopted

Security Council composition
- Permanent members: China; France; Soviet Union; United Kingdom; United States
- Non-permanent members: Argentina; Belgium; Canada; Colombia; Syria; Ukrainian SSR

United Nations Security Council Resolution 56, adopted on August 19, 1948, having received communications from the United Nations Mediator, Folke Bernadotte, concerning the situation in Jerusalem the Council directed the attention of the Governments and authorities to United Nations Security Council Resolution 54. The Council decided that all parties involved were to bear direct responsibility for all of their regular and irregular forces, that they were to use all means available to prevent the truce from being broken and that any group or subject that did was to be given a speedy trial.

The Council also decided that no party would be able to violate the truce on the grounds of retaliation for another violation and that no party would be entitled to gain military or political advantages through the violation of the truce.

The resolution was voted on in parts. As such, no vote took place on the whole of the resolution.

== See also ==
- List of United Nations Security Council Resolutions 1 to 100 (1946–1953)
