= United Nations Security Council Resolution 237 =

United Nations Security Council resolution

UN Security Council Resolution 237
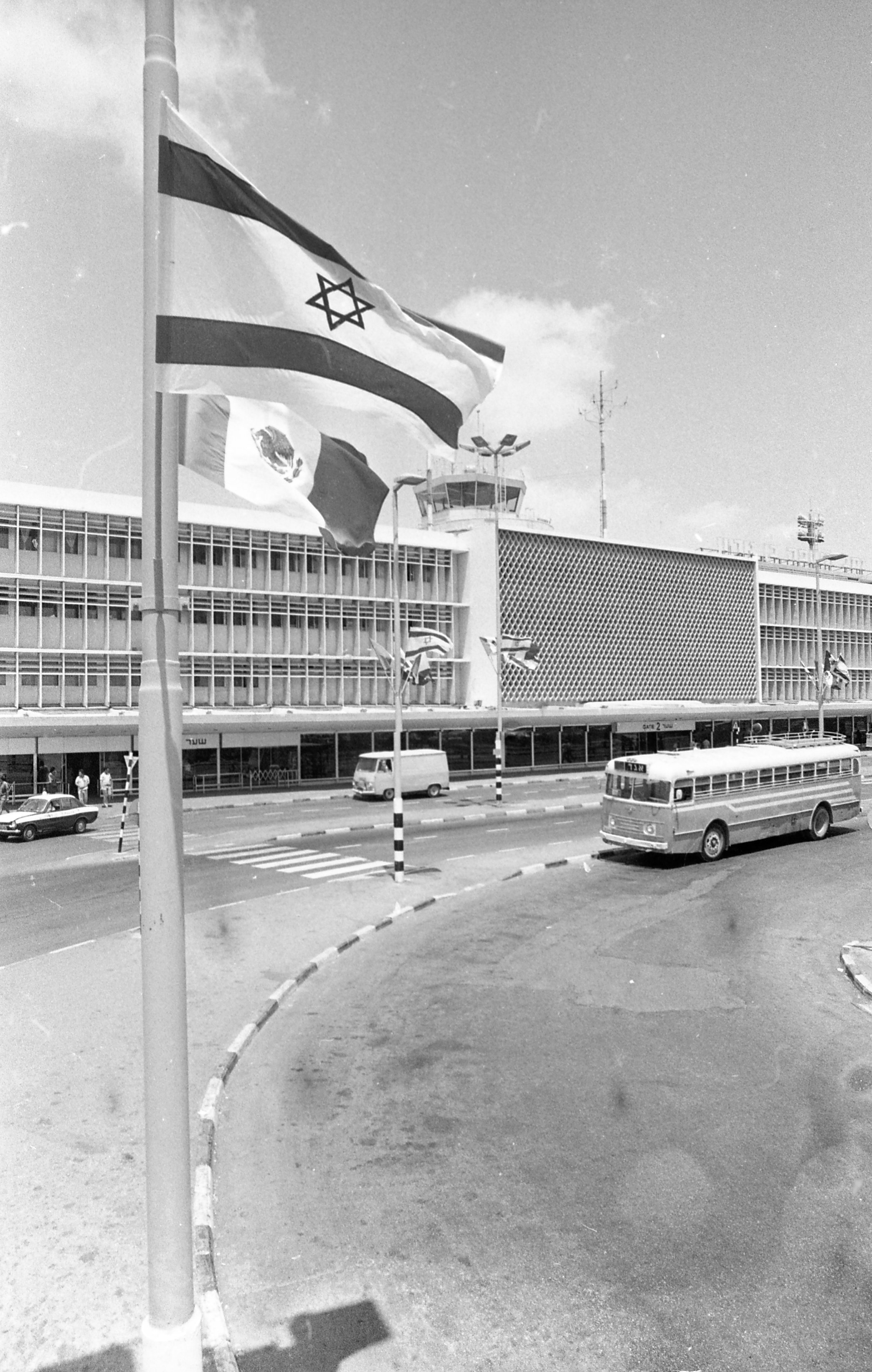
- Israel flag
- Date: June 14 1967
- Meeting no.: 1361
- Subject: The situation in the Middle East
- Voting summary: 15 voted for; None voted against; None abstained
- Result: Adopted

Security Council composition
- Permanent members: China; France; Soviet Union; United Kingdom; United States
- Non-permanent members: Argentina; Brazil; Bulgaria; Canada; Denmark; Ethiopia; India; Japan; Mali; Nigeria

Following the Six-Day War, United Nations Security Council adopted on June 14, 1967 Resolution 237, which called upon the government of Israel to ensure the safety and welfare of the inhabitants of the areas where military operations had taken place and to facilitate the return of those inhabitants who had fled. The resolution also recommended the governments concerned to respect humanitarian principles governing the treatment of prisoners of war and the protection of civilian persons in times of war contained in the Geneva Conventions. The Council also requested the Secretary-General to follow the effective implementation of this resolution and report back.

== See also ==
- List of United Nations Security Council Resolutions 201 to 300 (1965–1971)
- Six-Day War
