= United Nations Security Council Resolution 501 =

UN Security Council Resolution 501
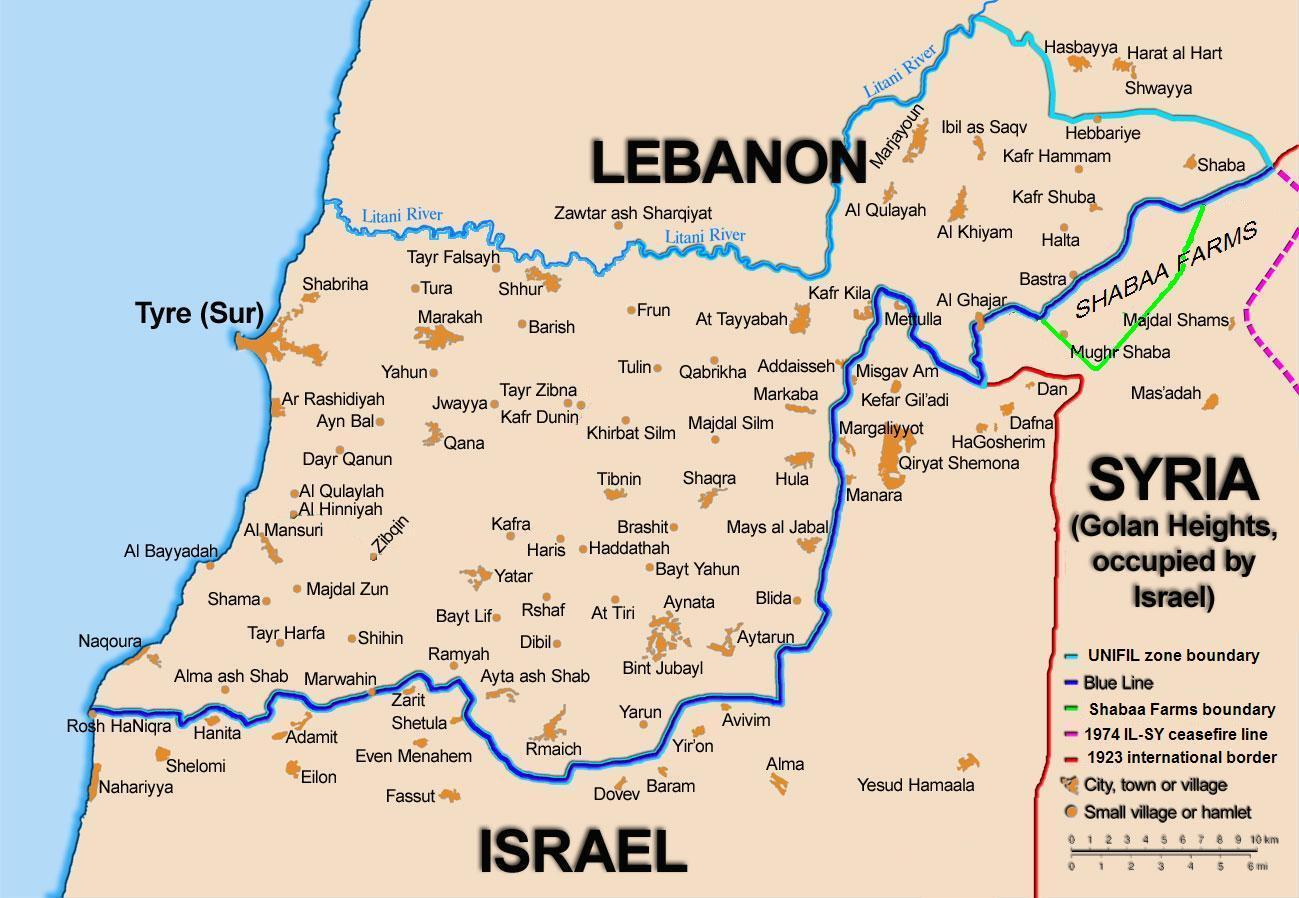
- The Blue Line
- Date: 25 February 1982
- Meeting no.: 2,332
- Code: S/RES/501 (Document)
- Subject: Israel–Lebanon
- Voting summary: 13 voted for; None voted against; 2 abstained
- Result: Adopted

Security Council composition
- Permanent members: China; France; Soviet Union; United Kingdom; United States
- Non-permanent members: Guyana; Ireland; Jordan; Japan; Panama; Poland; Spain; Togo; Uganda; Zaire

United Nations Security Council resolution 501, adopted on 25 February 1982, after recalling previous resolutions on the topic, particularly Resolution 425 (1978), and considering a report from the Secretary-General on the United Nations Interim Force in Lebanon (UNIFIL), the Council noted the continuing need for the Force given the situation between Israel and Lebanon.

The resolution went on to increase the size of UNIFIL from 6,000 to 7,000 personnel, and then reiterated the objectives of the Force, including the demand that it be free to operate in the region without restriction.

Resolution 501 was adopted by 13 votes to none, while the People's Republic of Poland and Soviet Union abstained from voting.

== See also ==
- Blue Line
- Israeli–Lebanese conflict
- List of United Nations Security Council Resolutions 501 to 600 (1982–1987)
