= United Nations Security Council Resolution 358 =

UN Security Council Resolution 358
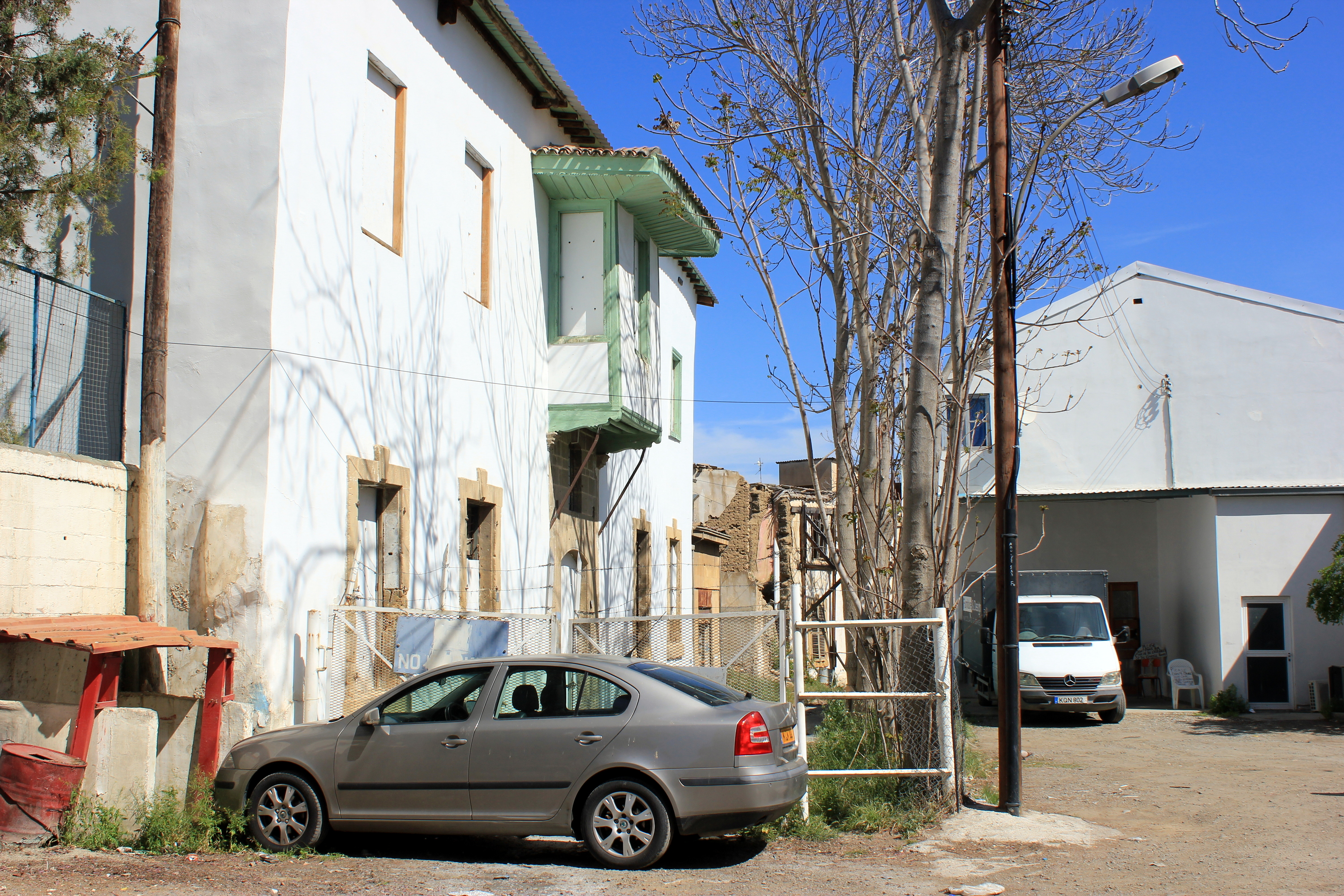
- Fence in Nicosia border
- Date: 15 August 1974
- Meeting no.: 1,793
- Code: S/RES/358 (Document)
- Subject: Cyprus
- Voting summary: 15 voted for; None voted against; None abstained
- Result: Adopted

Security Council composition
- Permanent members: China; France; Soviet Union; United Kingdom; United States
- Non-permanent members: Australia; Austria; Byelorussian SSR; Cameroon; Costa Rica; Indonesia; Iraq; Kenya; Mauritania; Peru

United Nations Security Council Resolution 358, adopted unanimously on 15 August 1974, deeply concerned about the continuing violence and bloodshed in Cyprus and deploring the non-compliance with resolution 357, the Council recalled its previous resolutions on the matter and insisted on their full implementation and that all parties immediately and strictly observe the cease-fire.

== See also ==
- Cyprus dispute
- List of United Nations Security Council Resolutions 301 to 400 (1971–1976)
- Turkish invasion of Cyprus
