= United Nations Security Council Resolution 351 =

UN Security Council Resolution 351
- Location of Bangladesh
- Date: 10 June 1974
- Meeting no.: 1,776
- Code: S/RES/351 (Document)
- Subject: New member: Bangladesh
- Result: Adopted

Security Council composition
- Permanent members: China; France; Soviet Union; United Kingdom; United States
- Non-permanent members: Australia; Austria; Byelorussian SSR; Cameroon; Costa Rica; Indonesia; Iraq; Kenya; Mauritania; Peru

United Nations Security Council Resolution 351, adopted on June 10, 1974, after examining the application of the People's Republic of Bangladesh for membership in the United Nations, the Council recommended to the General Assembly that the People's Republic of Bangladesh be admitted.

The resolution was adopted without vote.

== See also ==
- List of United Nations Security Council Resolutions 301 to 400 (1971–1976)
