= United Nations Security Council Resolution 376 =

UN Security Council Resolution 376
- Location of the Comoros
- Date: 17 October 1975
- Meeting no.: 1,848
- Code: S/RES/376 (Document)
- Subject: New member: Comoros
- Voting summary: 14 voted for; None voted against; None abstained; 1 present not voting
- Result: Adopted

Security Council composition
- Permanent members: China; France; Soviet Union; United Kingdom; United States
- Non-permanent members: Byelorussian SSR; Cameroon; Costa Rica; Guyana; Iraq; Italy; Japan; Mauritania; Sweden; Tanzania

United Nations Security Council Resolution 376, adopted on October 17, 1975, after examining the application of the Comoros for membership in the United Nations, the Council recommended to the General Assembly that the Comoros be admitted.

The resolution was adopted by 14 votes to none; France did not participate in the voting.

== See also ==
- List of United Nations Security Council Resolutions 301 to 400 (1971–1976)
