= United Nations Security Council Resolution 329 =

UN Security Council Resolution 329
- Date: 10 March 1973
- Meeting no.: 1,694
- Code: S/RES/329 (Document)
- Subject: Zambia's Decision to Impose Sanctions
- Voting summary: 15 voted for; None voted against; None abstained
- Result: Adopted

Security Council composition
- Permanent members: China; France; Soviet Union; United Kingdom; United States
- Non-permanent members: Australia; Austria; Guinea; India; Indonesia; Kenya; Panama; Peru; Sudan; Yugoslavia

United Nations Security Council Resolution 329, adopted unanimously on March 10, 1973, recalled it request to make assistance to Zambia a priority after it risked damaging its economy to uphold resolution 327 against Rhodesia and appealed to all states for immediate technical, financial and material assistance. The Council requested the Secretary-General to coordinate all the United Nations' agencies in helping Zambia and asked the Economic and Social Council to consider the question of economic assistance to Zambia periodically.

== See also ==
- History of Rhodesia
- List of United Nations Security Council Resolutions 301 to 400 (1971–1976)
