= United Nations Security Council Resolution 375 =

UN Security Council Resolution 375
- Location of Papua New Guinea
- Date: 22 September 1975
- Meeting no.: 1,841
- Code: S/RES/375 (Document)
- Subject: New member: Papua New Guinea
- Voting summary: 15 voted for; None voted against; None abstained
- Result: Adopted

Security Council composition
- Permanent members: China; France; Soviet Union; United Kingdom; United States
- Non-permanent members: Byelorussian SSR; Cameroon; Costa Rica; Guyana; Iraq; Italy; Japan; Mauritania; Sweden; Tanzania

United Nations Security Council Resolution 375, adopted on September 22, 1975, after examining the application of Independent State of Papua New Guinea for membership in the United Nations, the Council recommended to the General Assembly that Papua New Guinea be admitted.

== See also ==
- List of United Nations Security Council Resolutions 301 to 400 (1971–1976)
