= United Nations Security Council Resolution 336 =

UN Security Council Resolution 336
- Date: 18 July 1973
- Meeting no.: 1,732
- Code: S/RES/336 (Document)
- Subject: Admission of New Members to the UN: the Bahamas
- Voting summary: 15 voted for; None voted against; None abstained
- Result: Adopted

Security Council composition
- Permanent members: China; France; Soviet Union; United Kingdom; United States
- Non-permanent members: Australia; Austria; Guinea; India; Indonesia; Kenya; Panama; Peru; Sudan; Yugoslavia

United Nations Security Council Resolution 336, adopted on July 18, 1973, after examining the application of the Bahamas for membership in the United Nations, the Council recommended to the General Assembly that the Bahamas be admitted.

== See also ==
- List of United Nations Security Council Resolutions 301 to 400 (1971–1976)
