= United Nations Security Council Resolution 381 =

UN Security Council Resolution 381
- Aftermath of the Yom Kippur War
- Date: 30 November 1975
- Meeting no.: 1,856
- Code: S/RES/381 (Document)
- Subject: Israel-Syrian Arab Republic
- Voting summary: 13 voted for; None voted against; None abstained
- Result: Adopted

Security Council composition
- Permanent members: China; France; Soviet Union; United Kingdom; United States
- Non-permanent members: Byelorussian SSR; Cameroon; Costa Rica; Guyana; Iraq; Italy; Japan; Mauritania; Sweden; Tanzania

United Nations Security Council Resolution 381, adopted on November 30, 1975, considered a report by the Secretary-General regarding the United Nations Disengagement Observer Force and noted the discussions the Secretary-General had with all the concerned parties to the Middle East situation. The council expressed its concern over the continuing tension in the area and decided to:

(a) To reconvene on 12 January 1976, to continue the debate on the Middle East problem including the Palestinian question, taking into account all relevant United Nations resolutions;
(b) To renew the mandate of the United Nations Disengagement Observer Force for another period of six months;
(c) To request the Secretary-General to keep the Security Council informed on further developments.

The resolution was adopted by 13 votes to none; China and Iraq did not participate in the vote.

== See also ==
- Arab–Israeli conflict
- Israel–Syria relations
- List of United Nations Security Council Resolutions 301 to 400 (1971–1976)
- Yom Kippur War
