= United Nations Security Council Resolution 322 =

UN Security Council Resolution 322
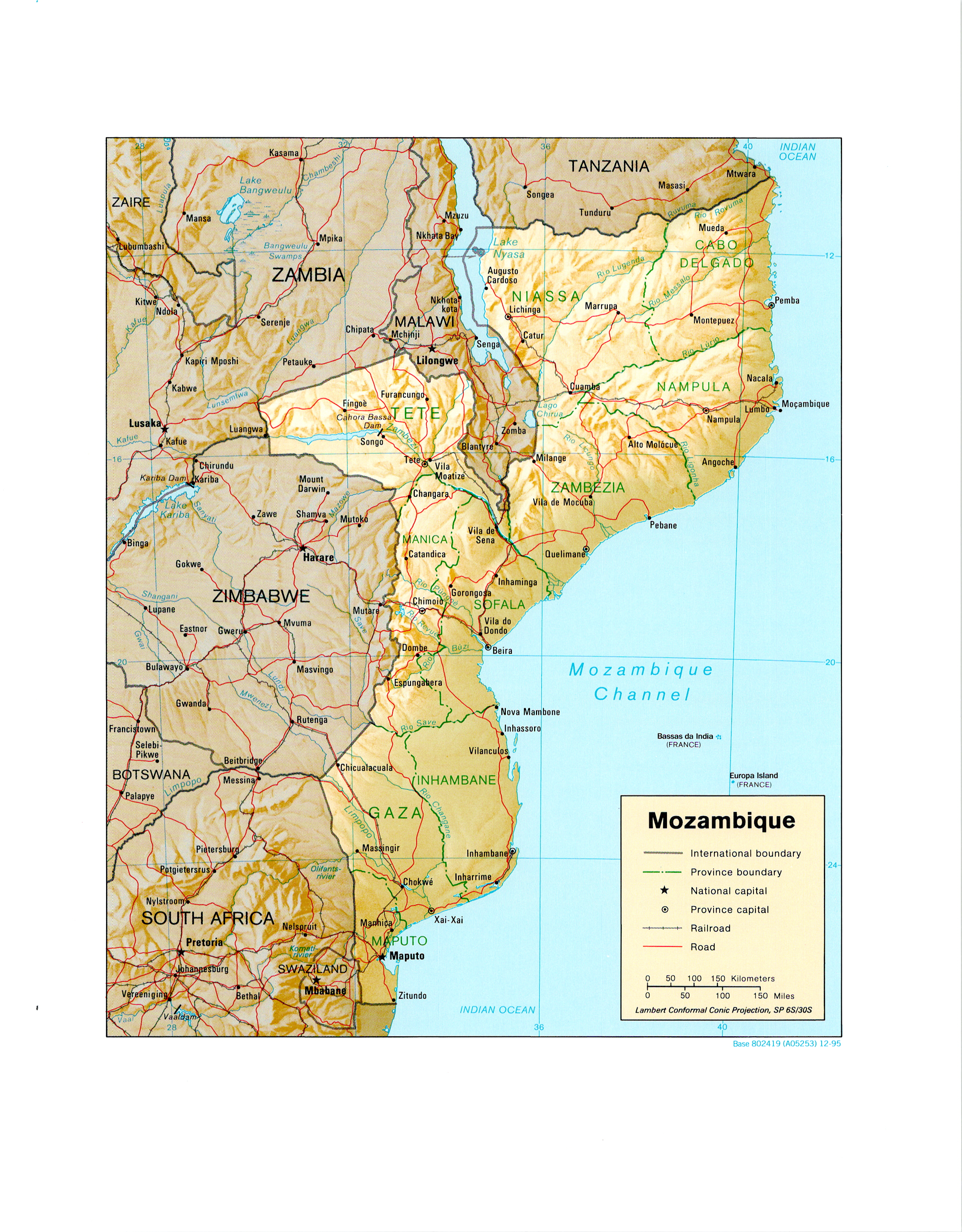
- Map of Mozambique
- Date: 22 November 1972
- Meeting no.: 1,677
- Code: S/RES/322 (Document)
- Subject: Question concerning the situation in Territories under Portuguese administration
- Voting summary: 15 voted for; None voted against; None abstained
- Result: Adopted

Security Council composition
- Permanent members: China; France; Soviet Union; United Kingdom; United States
- Non-permanent members: Argentina; Belgium; Guinea; India; Italy; Japan; Panama; Somalia; Sudan; Yugoslavia

United Nations Security Council Resolution 322, adopted unanimously on November 22, 1972, after reaffirming previous resolutions and considering the Organisation of African Unity's recognition of the revolutionary movements of Angola, Guinea-Bissau, Cape Verde and Mozambique, the Council called on the government of Portugal to cease its military operations and all acts of repression against the people of those territories. The Resolution called on Portugal to enter negotiations with the parties concerned with a view to achieving a solution to the armed confrontations and permitting the peoples of those territories to exercise their right to self-determination and requested the Secretary-General to follow developments and report periodically to the Council.

== See also ==
- List of United Nations Security Council Resolutions 301 to 400 (1971–1976)
- Portuguese Colonial War
- Portuguese Empire
