= United Nations Security Council Resolution 356 =

UN Security Council Resolution 356
- Guinea-Bissau (highlighted)
- Date: 12 August 1974
- Meeting no.: 1,791
- Code: S/RES/356 (Document)
- Subject: New member: Guinea-Bissau
- Voting summary: 15 voted for; None voted against; None abstained
- Result: Adopted

Security Council composition
- Permanent members: China; France; Soviet Union; United Kingdom; United States
- Non-permanent members: Australia; Austria; Byelorussian SSR; Cameroon; Costa Rica; Indonesia; Iraq; Kenya; Mauritania; Peru

United Nations Security Council Resolution 356, adopted unanimously on August 12, 1974, after examining the application of the Republic of Guinea-Bissau for membership in the United Nations, the Council recommended to the General Assembly that the Republic of Guinea-Bissau be admitted.

== See also ==
- List of United Nations Security Council Resolutions 301 to 400 (1971–1976)
