= United Nations Security Council Resolution 305 =

UN Security Council Resolution 305
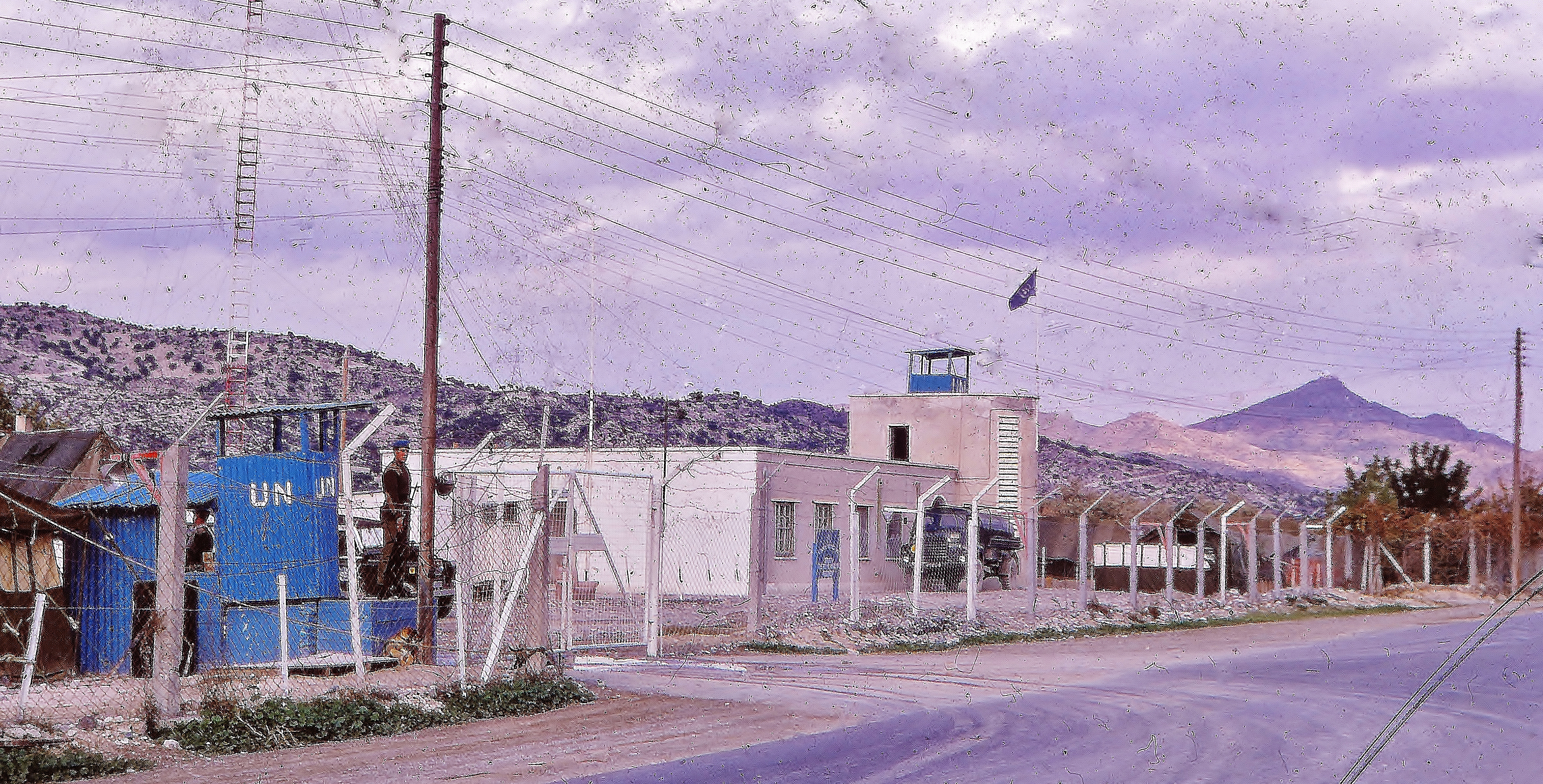
- UN base in Cyprus
- Date: 13 December 1971
- Meeting no.: 1,612
- Code: S/RES/305 (Document)
- Subject: The Cyprus Question
- Voting summary: 14 voted for; None voted against; None abstained
- Result: Adopted

Security Council composition
- Permanent members: China; France; Soviet Union; United Kingdom; United States
- Non-permanent members: Argentina; Belgium; Burundi; Italy; Japan; Nicaragua; Poland; Sierra Leone; Somalia; Syria

United Nations Security Council Resolution 305, adopted on December 13, 1971, after reaffirming previous resolutions on the topic, and noting recent encouraging developments, the Council extended the stationing in Cyprus of the United Nations Peacekeeping Force in Cyprus for a further period, now ending on June 15, 1972. The council also called upon the parties directly concerned to continue to act with the utmost restraint and to co-operate fully with the peacekeeping force.

The resolution was adopted unanimously with 14 votes; China did not participate in voting.

== See also ==
- Cyprus dispute
- List of United Nations Security Council Resolutions 301 to 400 (1971–1976)
