= United Nations Security Council Resolution 382 =

UN Security Council Resolution 382
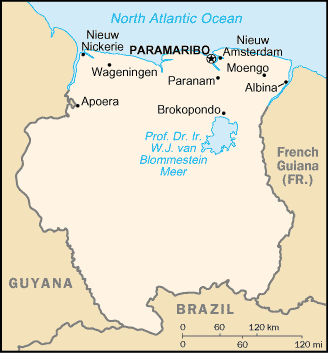
- Location of Suriname
- Date: 1 December 1975
- Meeting no.: 1,858
- Code: S/RES/382 (Document)
- Subject: New member: Suriname
- Voting summary: 15 voted for; None voted against; None abstained
- Result: Adopted

Security Council composition
- Permanent members: China; France; Soviet Union; United Kingdom; United States
- Non-permanent members: Byelorussian SSR; Cameroon; Costa Rica; Guyana; Iraq; Italy; Japan; Mauritania; Sweden; Tanzania

United Nations Security Council Resolution 382, adopted unanimously on December 1, 1975, after examining the application of Suriname for membership in the United Nations, the Council recommended to the General Assembly that Suriname be admitted.

== See also ==
- List of United Nations Security Council Resolutions 301 to 400 (1971–1976)
