= United Nations Security Council Resolution 325 =

UN Security Council Resolution 325
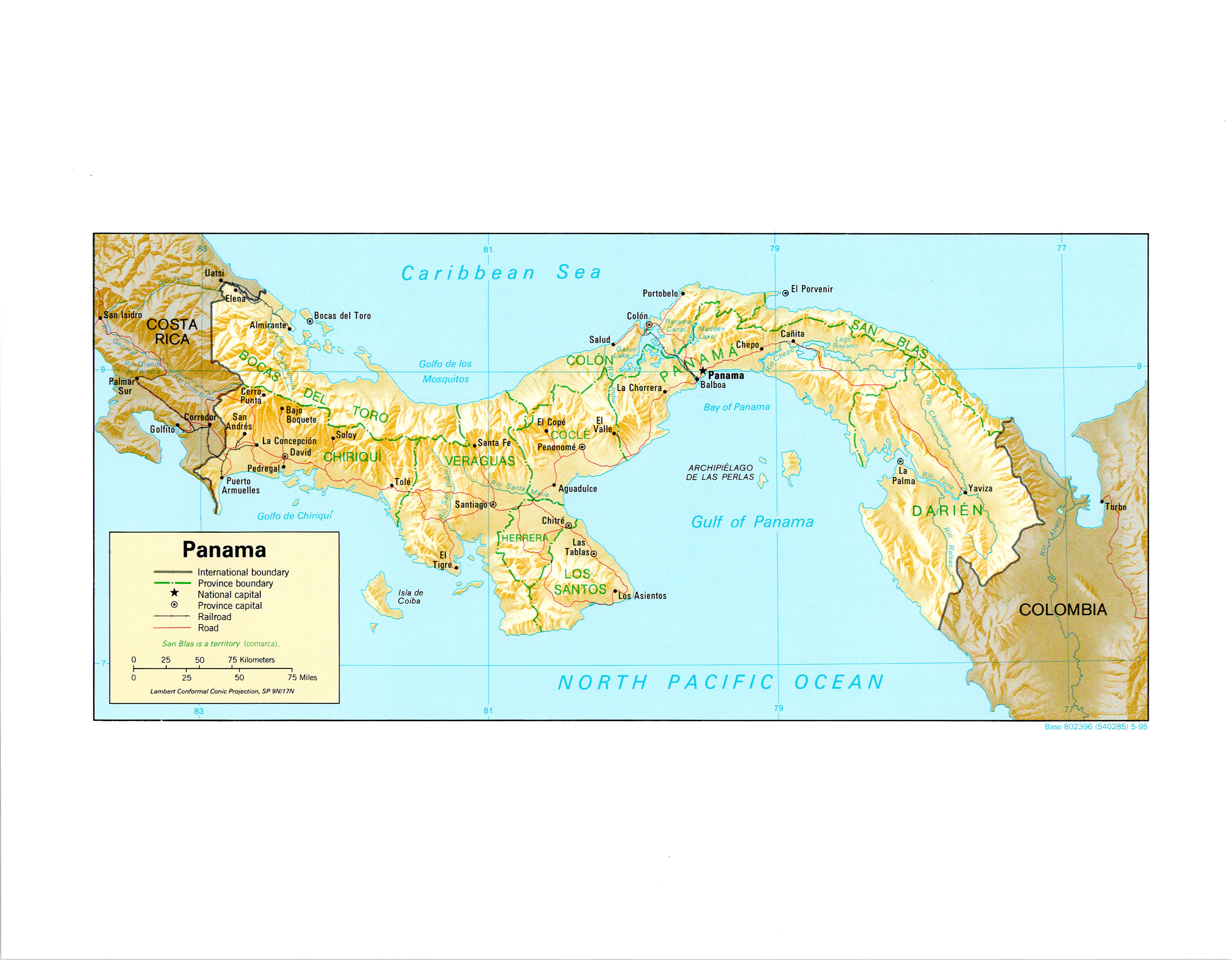
- Map of Panama
- Date: 26 January 1973
- Meeting no.: 1,686
- Code: S/RES/325 (Document)
- Subject: Request of Panama
- Voting summary: 15 voted for; None voted against; None abstained
- Result: Adopted

Security Council composition
- Permanent members: China; France; Soviet Union; United Kingdom; United States
- Non-permanent members: Australia; Austria; Guinea; India; Indonesia; Kenya; Panama; Peru; Sudan; Yugoslavia

United Nations Security Council Resolution 325, adopted on January 26, 1973, after acknowledging the government of Panama's offer do what ever was necessary to host the Council and the Latin American Group's support for this idea, the Council decided to hold meetings at Panama City from March 12 to March 21, 1973. The agenda for these meetings was to be "Consideration of measures for the maintenance and strengthening of international peace and security in Latin America in conformity with the provisions and principles of the Charter". The Council requested the Secretary-General enter into negotiations with the Panamanian government to conclude an appropriate conference agreement.

The President of the Council stated the resolution was adopted unanimously in the absence of any objections.

== See also ==
- List of United Nations Security Council Resolutions 301 to 400 (1971–1976)
