= United Nations Security Council Resolution 312 =

UN Security Council Resolution 312
- Date: 4 February 1972
- Meeting no.: 1,639
- Code: S/RES/312 (Document)
- Subject: Question concerning the situation in Territories under Portuguese administration
- Voting summary: 9 voted for; None voted against; 6 abstained
- Result: Adopted

Security Council composition
- Permanent members: China; France; Soviet Union; United Kingdom; United States
- Non-permanent members: Argentina; Belgium; Guinea; India; Italy; Japan; Panama; Somalia; Sudan; Yugoslavia

United Nations Security Council Resolution 312, adopted on February 4, 1972, after reaffirming previous resolutions on the topic and deploring those who failed to conform to them the Council called upon Portugal to immediately recognize the right of the peoples of her colonies to self-determination, to cease all acts of repression against the peoples of Angola, Mozambique and Guinea (Bissau), to withdraw its armed forces from those areas, to promulgate an unconditional political amnesty and to transfer power to freely elected native representative institutions.

The Council then called upon states to refrain from offering the Portuguese government any military assistance which would enable it to continue to repress the peoples of its territories and requested the Secretary-General to follow the implementation of the present resolution and report back from time to time.

Resolution 312 passed with nine votes and six abstentions from Argentina, Belgium, France, Italy, the United Kingdom and United States.

== See also ==
- List of United Nations Security Council Resolutions 301 to 400 (1971–1976)
- Portuguese Empire
- Portuguese Colonial War
