= United Nations Security Council Resolution 399 =

UN Security Council Resolution 399
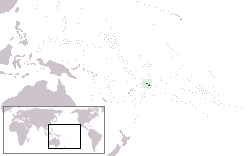
- Location of Western Samoa
- Date: 1 December 1976
- Meeting no.: 1,977
- Code: S/RES/399 (Document)
- Subject: Admission of new Members to the UN: Western Samoa
- Voting summary: 15 voted for; None voted against; None abstained
- Result: Adopted

Security Council composition
- Permanent members: China; France; Soviet Union; United Kingdom; United States
- Non-permanent members: Benin; Guyana; Italy; Japan; Libya; Pakistan; Panama; Romania; Sweden; Tanzania

United Nations Security Council Resolution 399, adopted unanimously on December 1, 1976, after examining the application of the Western Samoa for membership in the United Nations, the Council recommended to the General Assembly that Samoa be admitted.

== See also ==
- List of United Nations member states
- List of United Nations Security Council Resolutions 301 to 400 (1971–1976)
