= United Nations Security Council Resolution 311 =

1972 United Nations Security Council resolution

UN Security Council Resolution 311
- Date: 4 February 1972
- Meeting no.: 1,638
- Code: S/RES/311 (Document)
- Subject: The Question of race conflict in South Africa resulting from the policies of apartheid of the Government of the Republic of South Africa
- Voting summary: 14 voted for; None voted against; 1 abstained
- Result: Adopted

Security Council composition
- Permanent members: China; France; Soviet Union; United Kingdom; United States
- Non-permanent members: Argentina; Belgium; Guinea; India; Italy; Japan; Panama; Somalia; Sudan; Yugoslavia

United Nations Security Council Resolution 311, adopted on February 4, 1972, after reaffirming previous resolutions on the topic and noting the continued military build-up by South Africa, the Council condemned the policy of apartheid and recognized the legitimacy of the struggle of the oppressed people of South Africa.

The Council then urgently called upon the government of South Africa to release all persons imprisoned as a result of apartheid and called upon all states to strictly observe the arms embargo. The Council finished by urging governments and individuals to contribute generously and regularly to UN funds for humanitarian and training purposes for the people of South Africa and decided to examine methods of resolving the present situation.

The resolution was adopted by 14 votes to none; France abstained from voting.

== See also ==
- List of United Nations Security Council Resolutions 301 to 400 (1971–1976)
- South Africa under apartheid
