= United Nations Security Council Resolution 324 =

UN Security Council Resolution 324
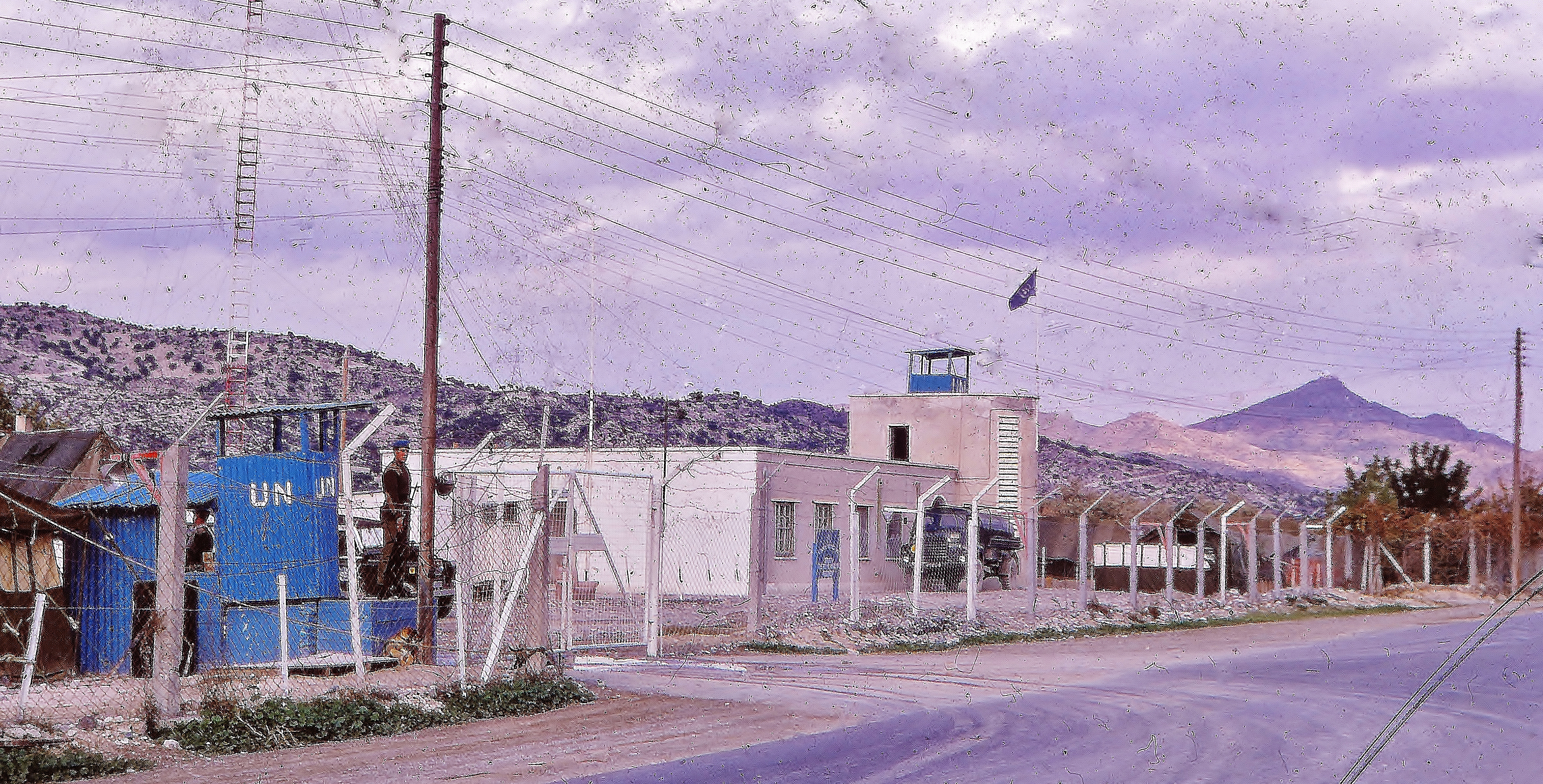
- UN base in Cyprus
- Date: 12 December 1972
- Meeting no.: 1,683
- Code: S/RES/324 (Document)
- Subject: The Cyprus Question
- Voting summary: 14 voted for; None voted against; 1 abstained
- Result: Adopted

Security Council composition
- Permanent members: China; France; Soviet Union; United Kingdom; United States
- Non-permanent members: Argentina; Belgium; Guinea; India; Italy; Japan; Panama; Somalia; Sudan; Yugoslavia

United Nations Security Council Resolution 324, adopted on December 12, 1972, after reaffirming previous resolutions on the topic, the Council extended the stationing in Cyprus of the United Nations Peacekeeping Force in Cyprus for a further period, now ending on June 15, 1973. The Council also called upon the parties directly concerned to continue to act with the utmost restraint and to co-operate fully with the peacekeeping force.

The resolution was passed by 14 votes to none, while the People's Republic of China abstained from the vote.

== See also ==
- Cyprus dispute
- List of United Nations Security Council Resolutions 301 to 400 (1971–1976)
