= United Nations Security Council Resolution 341 =

UN Security Council Resolution 341
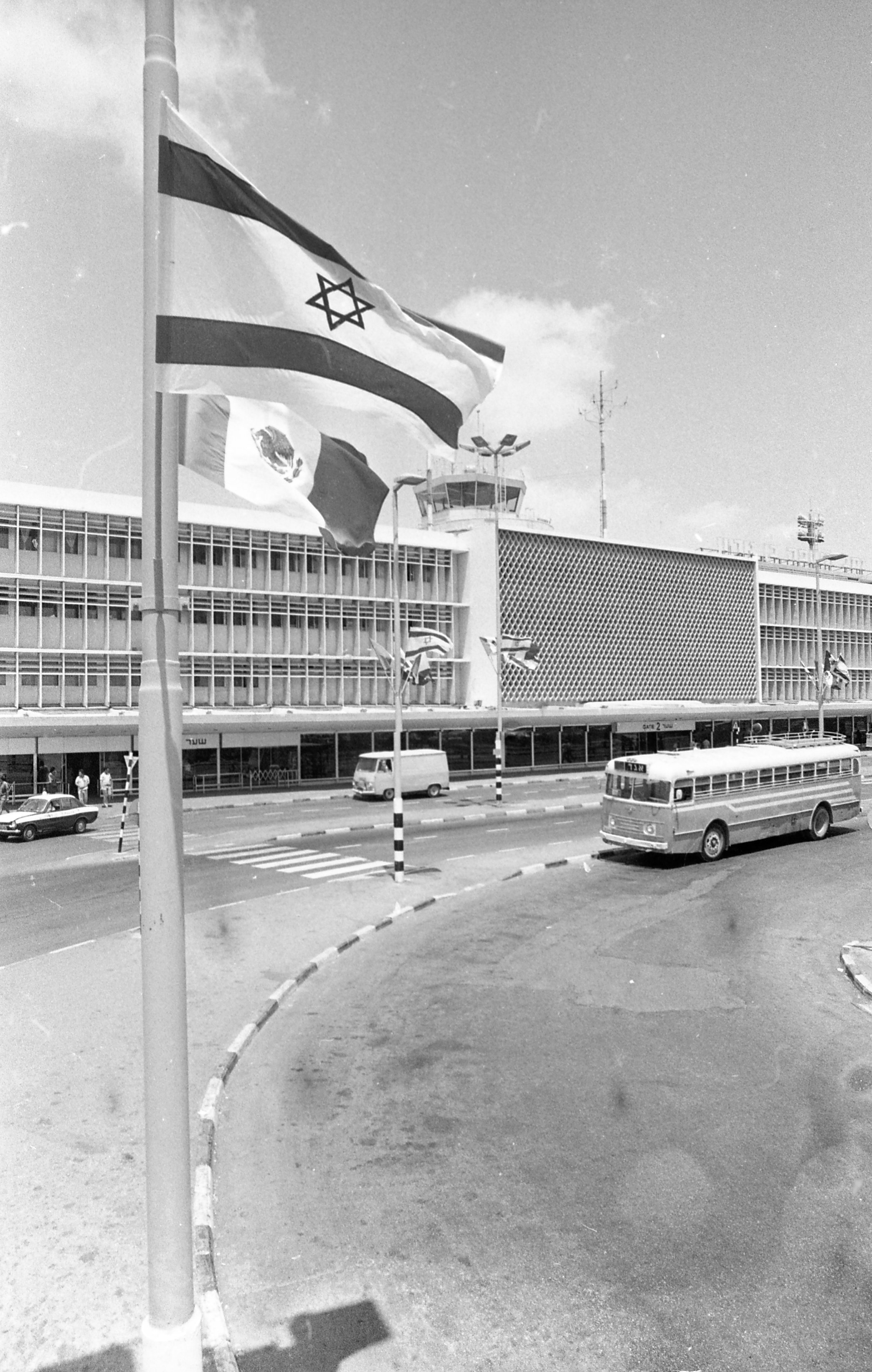
- Israel flag
- Date: 27 October 1973
- Meeting no.: 1,752
- Code: S/RES/341 (Document)
- Subject: On Establishment of UNEF
- Voting summary: 14 voted for; None voted against; None abstained
- Result: Adopted

Security Council composition
- Permanent members: China; France; Soviet Union; United Kingdom; United States
- Non-permanent members: Australia; Austria; Guinea; India; Indonesia; Kenya; Panama; Peru; Sudan; Yugoslavia

United Nations Security Council Resolution 341, adopted on October 27, 1973, after the report of the Secretary-General on the implementation of Resolution 340, the Council decided that the Peacekeeping Force would be established for a six-month period and would be continued thereafter if the Council wished it to do so.

The resolution was adopted with 14 votes to none, with the People's Republic of China not participating in the vote.

== See also ==
- Arab–Israeli conflict
- List of United Nations Security Council Resolutions 301 to 400 (1971–1976)
- Yom Kippur War
