= United Nations Security Council Resolution 400 =

UN Security Council Resolution 400
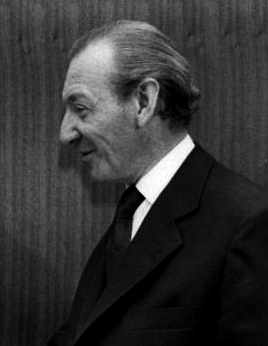
- Kurt Waldheim
- Date: 7 December 1976
- Meeting no.: 1,978
- Code: S/RES/400 (Document)
- Subject: Recommendation regarding the appointment of the Secretary-General
- Result: Adopted

Security Council composition
- Permanent members: China; France; Soviet Union; United Kingdom; United States
- Non-permanent members: Benin; Guyana; Italy; Japan; Libya; Pakistan; Panama; Romania; Sweden; Tanzania

United Nations Security Council Resolution 400, adopted on December 7, 1976 in a closed meeting, after considering the recommendation of the appointment of the Secretary-General of the United Nations, the Council recommended to the General Assembly that Kurt Waldheim be appointed as Secretary-General for a second term beginning January 1, 1977 and ending December 31, 1981.

The text of the resolution and the meeting record of 7 December 1976 state that the recommendation was unanimous, but the United Nations Digital Library states that Benin and China abstained in a 13–0–2 vote.

== See also ==
- List of United Nations Security Council Resolutions 301 to 400 (1971–1976)
- List of secretaries-general of the United Nations
