= United Nations Security Council Resolution 370 =

UN Security Council Resolution 370
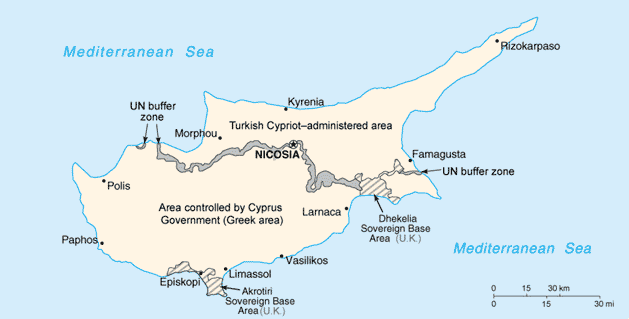
- Divided Cyprus
- Date: 13 June 1975
- Meeting no.: 1,830
- Code: S/RES/370 (Document)
- Subject: Cyprus
- Voting summary: 14 voted for; None voted against; None abstained
- Result: Adopted

Security Council composition
- Permanent members: China; France; Soviet Union; United Kingdom; United States
- Non-permanent members: Byelorussian SSR; Cameroon; Costa Rica; Guyana; Iraq; Italy; Japan; Mauritania; Sweden; Tanzania

United Nations Security Council Resolution 370, adopted on June 13, 1975, extended the stationing of the United Nations Peacekeeping Force in Cyprus for another 6 months until December 15, 1975. This extension occurred in the wake of the Turkish invasion of Cyprus, and the Council urged the Secretary-General to continue the mission of good offices that was entrusted to him by resolution 367 and submit an interim report to them by September 15 and a definitive one no later than December 15.

The resolution was adopted by 14 votes to none, while the People's Republic of China did not participate in the vote.

== See also ==
- Cyprus dispute
- List of United Nations Security Council Resolutions 301 to 400 (1971–1976)
- Turkish Invasion of Cyprus
