= United Nations Security Council Resolution 342 =

UN Security Council Resolution 342
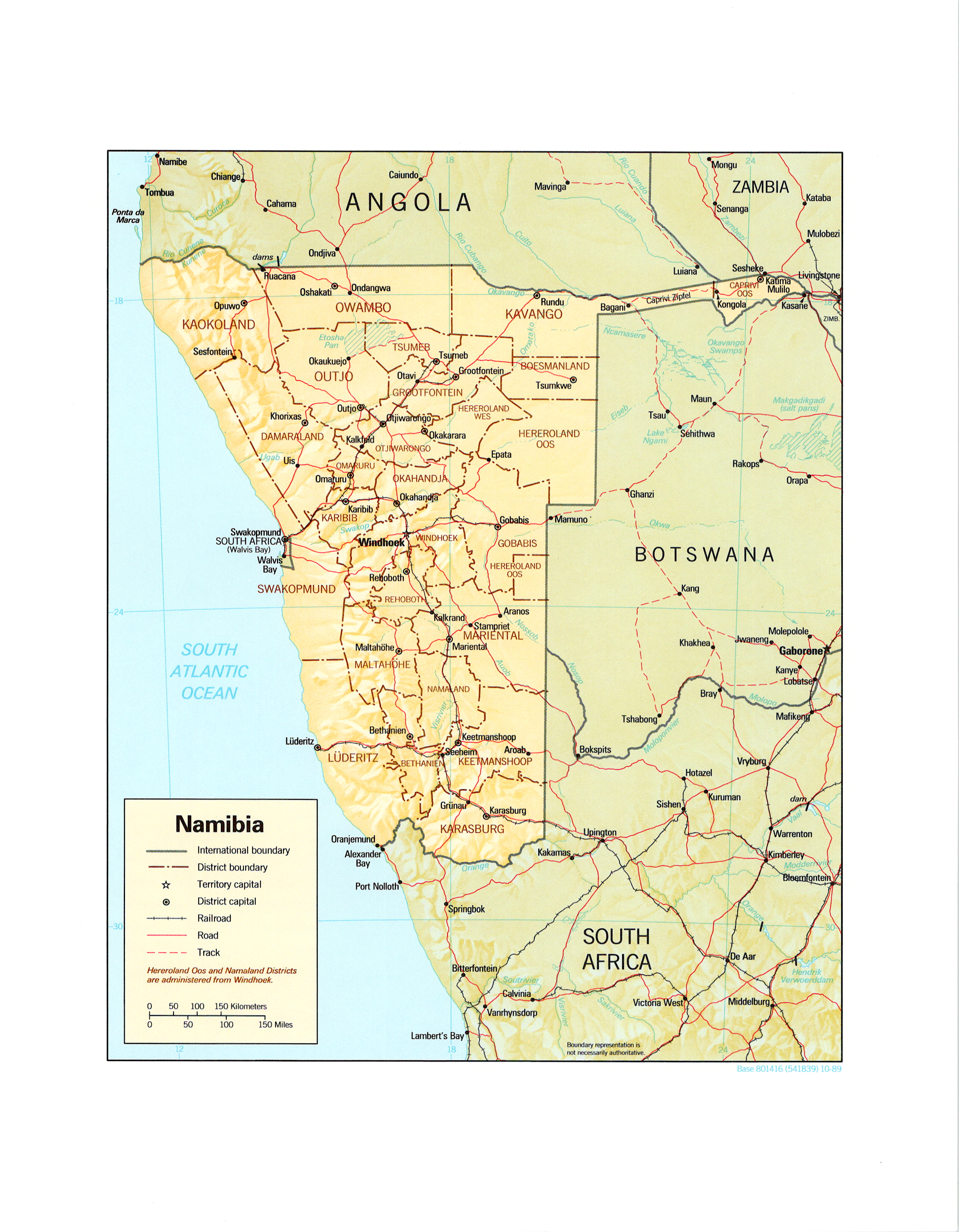
- Map of Namibia
- Date: 11 December 1973
- Meeting no.: 1,758
- Code: S/RES/342 (Document)
- Subject: The Situation in Namibia
- Voting summary: 15 voted for; None voted against; None abstained
- Result: Adopted

Security Council composition
- Permanent members: China; France; Soviet Union; United Kingdom; United States
- Non-permanent members: Australia; Austria; Guinea; India; Indonesia; Kenya; Panama; Peru; Sudan; Yugoslavia

United Nations Security Council Resolution 342 was adopted unanimously on December 11, 1973. After noting with appreciation a report by the Secretary-General, the Security Council decided to discontinue further efforts on the basis of Resolution 309, and requested the Secretary-General keep them informed of any new developments concerning the question of Namibia.

== See also ==
- History of Namibia
- List of United Nations Security Council Resolutions 301 to 400 (1971–1976)
- South West Africa
