= United Nations Security Council Resolution 361 =

UN Security Council Resolution 361
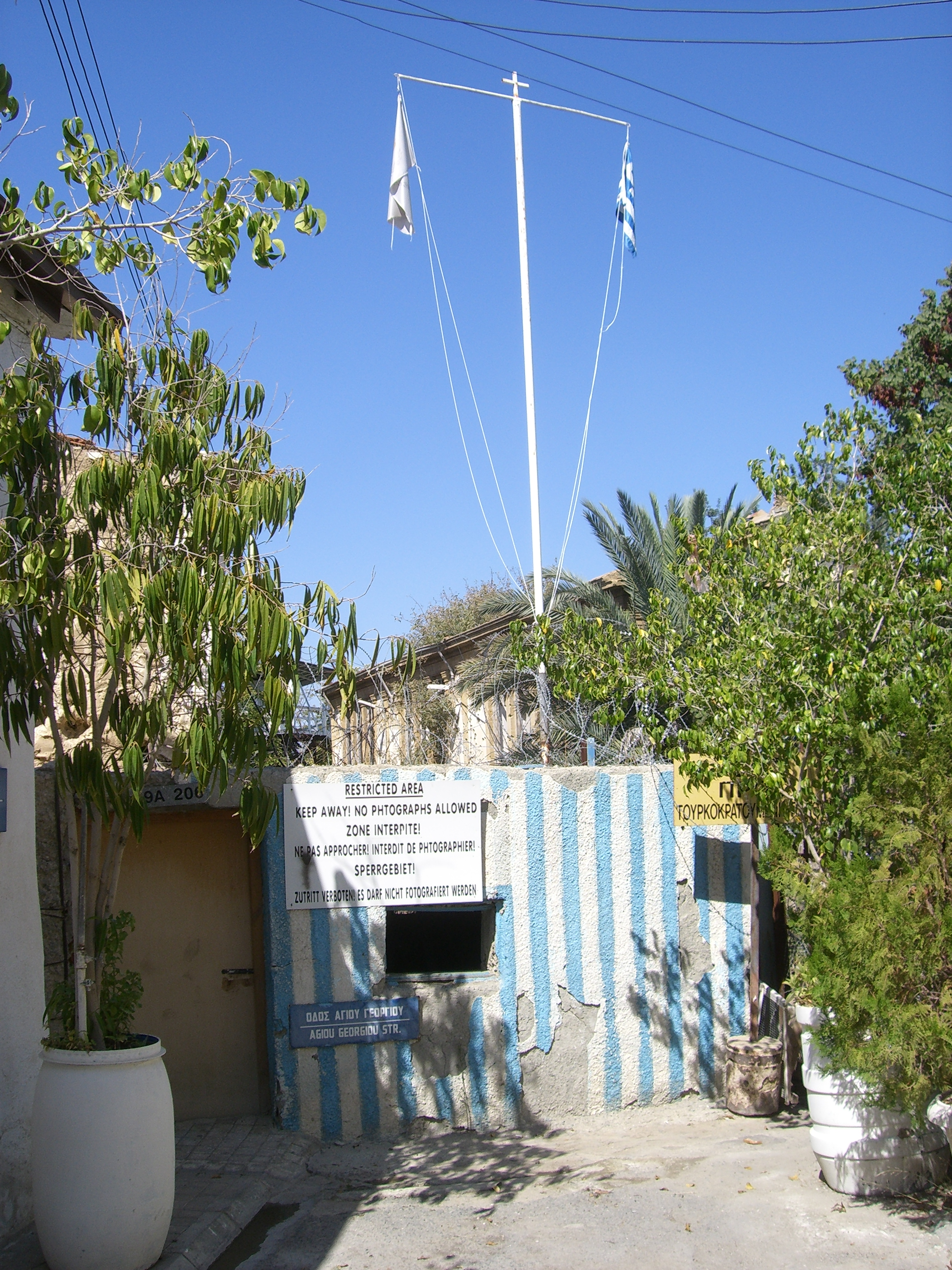
- UN buffer zone in Nicosia
- Date: 30 August 1974
- Meeting no.: 1,795
- Code: S/RES/361 (Document)
- Subject: Cyprus
- Voting summary: 15 voted for; None voted against; None abstained
- Result: Adopted

Security Council composition
- Permanent members: China; France; Soviet Union; United Kingdom; United States
- Non-permanent members: Australia; Austria; Byelorussian SSR; Cameroon; Costa Rica; Indonesia; Iraq; Kenya; Mauritania; Peru

United Nations Security Council Resolution 361, adopted unanimously on 30 August 1974, after recalling previous resolutions and noting the dire humanitarian conditions in on Cyprus as well as the actions of the UN High Commissioner for Refugees, the Council expressed their appreciation to the Secretary-General Kurt Waldheim for the part he played in bringing about talks between the leaders of the two communities and warmly welcomed this development.

The Council expressed its grave concern for the plight of the refugees and called upon all the parties to do everything in their power to alleviate human suffering and to ensure the respect of fundamental human rights. The resolution goes on to request the Secretary-General to submit a report on the situation and that he continue to provide emergency UN humanitarian assistance to all populations on the island. The resolution closes by asking all parties, as a demonstration of good faith, to take steps which may promote comprehensive and successful negotiations and reiterated a call for all parties to cooperate fully with the United Nations Peacekeeping Force in Cyprus.

== See also ==
- Cyprus dispute
- List of United Nations Security Council Resolutions 301 to 400 (1971–1976)
- Turkish invasion of Cyprus
