= United Nations Security Council Resolution 362 =

UN Security Council Resolution 362
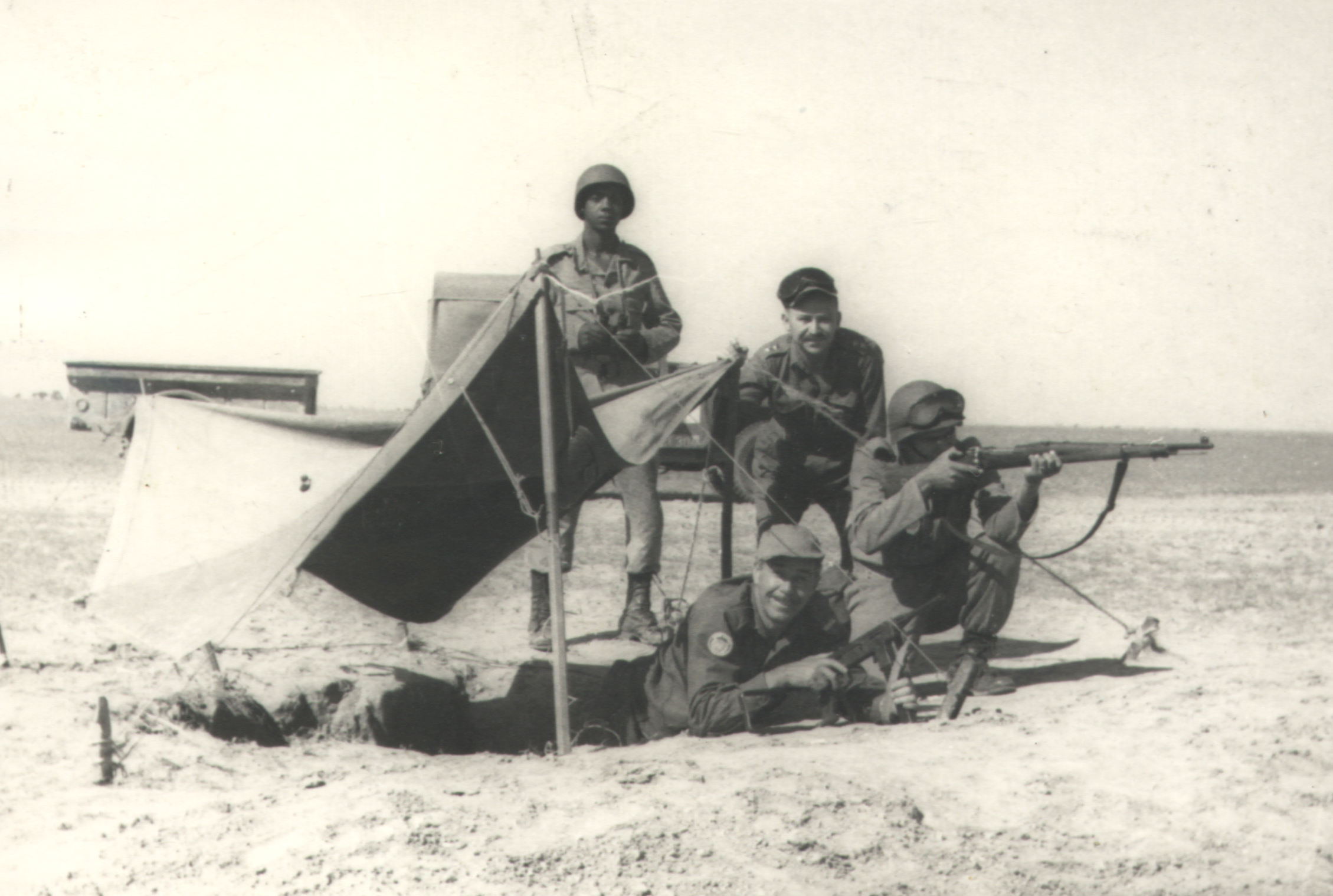
- UN troops
- Date: 23 October 1974
- Meeting no.: 1,799
- Code: S/RES/362 (Document)
- Subject: Egypt-Israel
- Voting summary: 13 voted for; None voted against; None abstained
- Result: Adopted

Security Council composition
- Permanent members: China; France; Soviet Union; United Kingdom; United States
- Non-permanent members: Australia; Austria; Byelorussian SSR; Cameroon; Costa Rica; Indonesia; Iraq; Kenya; Mauritania; Peru

United Nations Security Council Resolution 362 was adopted by the U.N. on October 23, 1974. The Security Council decided that, although the Middle East remained quiet, the situation was still volatile, and therefore this Security Council resolution extended the mandate of the United Nations Emergency Force for another six months, until April 24, 1975. The Council commended the Force and those governments supplying men to it for their contributions and expressed its confidence that the Force would be maintained with maximum efficiency and economy. The Resolution also reaffirmed that the Force must be able to function militarily in the whole Egypt-Israel sector of operations without differentiation regarding the UN status of the various contingents.

The resolution passed with 13 votes to none, while China and Iraq did not participate in voting.

== See also ==
- Arab–Israeli conflict
- Egypt–Israel relations
- List of United Nations Security Council Resolutions 301 to 400 (1971–1976)
- Yom Kippur War
