= United Nations Security Council Resolution 397 =

UN Security Council Resolution 397
- Location of the People's Republic of Angola
- Date: 22 November 1976
- Meeting no.: 1,974
- Code: S/RES/397 (Document)
- Subject: Admission of new Members to the UN: Angola
- Voting summary: 13 voted for; None voted against; 1 abstained; 1 present not voting
- Result: Adopted

Security Council composition
- Permanent members: China; France; Soviet Union; United Kingdom; United States
- Non-permanent members: Benin; Guyana; Italy; Japan; Libya; Pakistan; Panama; Romania; Sweden; Tanzania

United Nations Security Council Resolution 397, adopted on November 22, 1976, after examining the application of the People's Republic of Angola for membership in the United Nations, the Council recommended to the General Assembly that Angola (now the Republic of Angola) be admitted.

The resolution was adopted by 13 votes to none, while the United States abstained and China did not participate in the voting.

== See also ==
- List of United Nations member states
- List of United Nations Security Council Resolutions 301 to 400 (1971–1976)
