= United Nations Security Council Resolution 320 =

UN Security Council Resolution 320
- Date: 29 September 1972
- Meeting no.: 1,666
- Code: S/RES/320 (Document)
- Subject: Question concerning the situation in Southern Rhodesia
- Voting summary: 13 voted for; None voted against; 2 abstained
- Result: Adopted

Security Council composition
- Permanent members: China; France; Soviet Union; United Kingdom; United States
- Non-permanent members: Argentina; Belgium; Guinea; India; Italy; Japan; Panama; Somalia; Sudan; Yugoslavia

United Nations Security Council Resolution 320, adopted on 29 September 1972, after reaffirming previous resolutions, the Council expressed concern that despite the previous resolutions, several states were covertly and overtly violating the sanctions on Southern Rhodesia. The Council requested that the committee which had been established in resolution 253, consider the type of action which should be taken "in view of the open and persistent refusal of South Africa and Portugal to implement sanctions" and asked for the report no later than 31 January 1973.

The resolution was adopted with 13 votes to none; the United Kingdom and United States abstained.

== See also ==
- List of United Nations Security Council Resolutions 301 to 400 (1971–1976)
- Unilateral Declaration of Independence (Rhodesia)
