= United Nations Security Council Resolution 359 =

UN Security Council Resolution 359
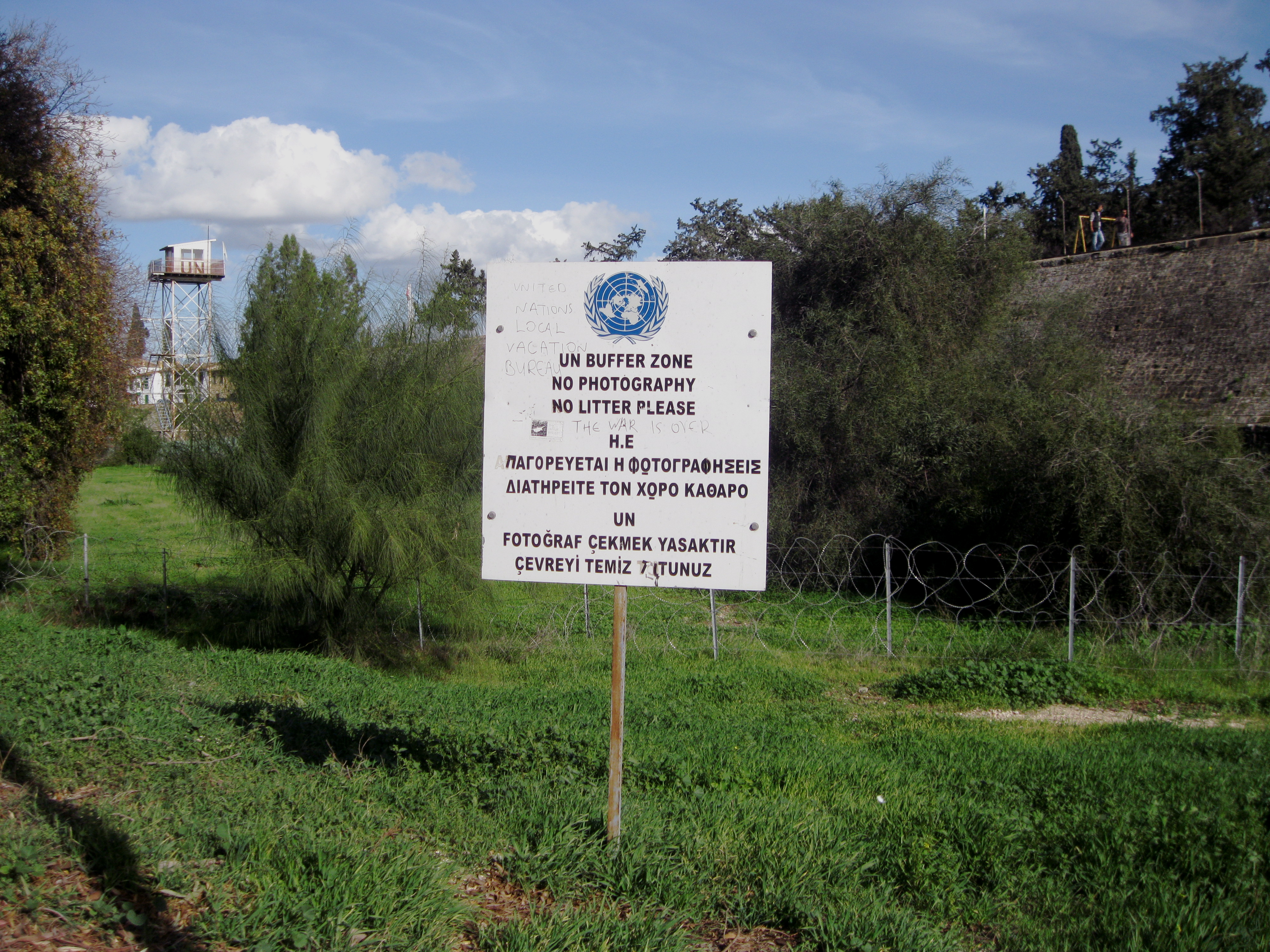
- Sign in the UN buffer zone
- Date: 15 August 1974
- Meeting no.: 1,793
- Code: S/RES/359 (Document)
- Subject: Cyprus
- Voting summary: 14 voted for; None voted against; None abstained
- Result: Adopted

Security Council composition
- Permanent members: China; France; Soviet Union; United Kingdom; United States
- Non-permanent members: Australia; Austria; Byelorussian SSR; Cameroon; Costa Rica; Indonesia; Iraq; Kenya; Mauritania; Peru

United Nations Security Council Resolution 359, adopted on 15 August 1974, after noting with concern a report from the Secretary-General on the continuing military action in Cyprus and recalling that United Nations Peacekeeping Force in Cyprus was placed there with the full consent of the governments of Cyprus, Turkey and Greece, the Council deplored the fact that members of the Force had been killed and wounded. The Resolution demands that all parties respect the status of the Force and demands that all parties co-operate with them in carrying out their tasks in all areas of Cyprus.

The resolution was adopted with 14 votes to none, one member, the People's Republic of China, did not participate in voting.

== See also ==
- Cyprus dispute
- List of United Nations Security Council Resolutions 301 to 400 (1971–1976)
- Turkish invasion of Cyprus
