= United Nations Security Council Resolution 330 =

UN Security Council Resolution 330
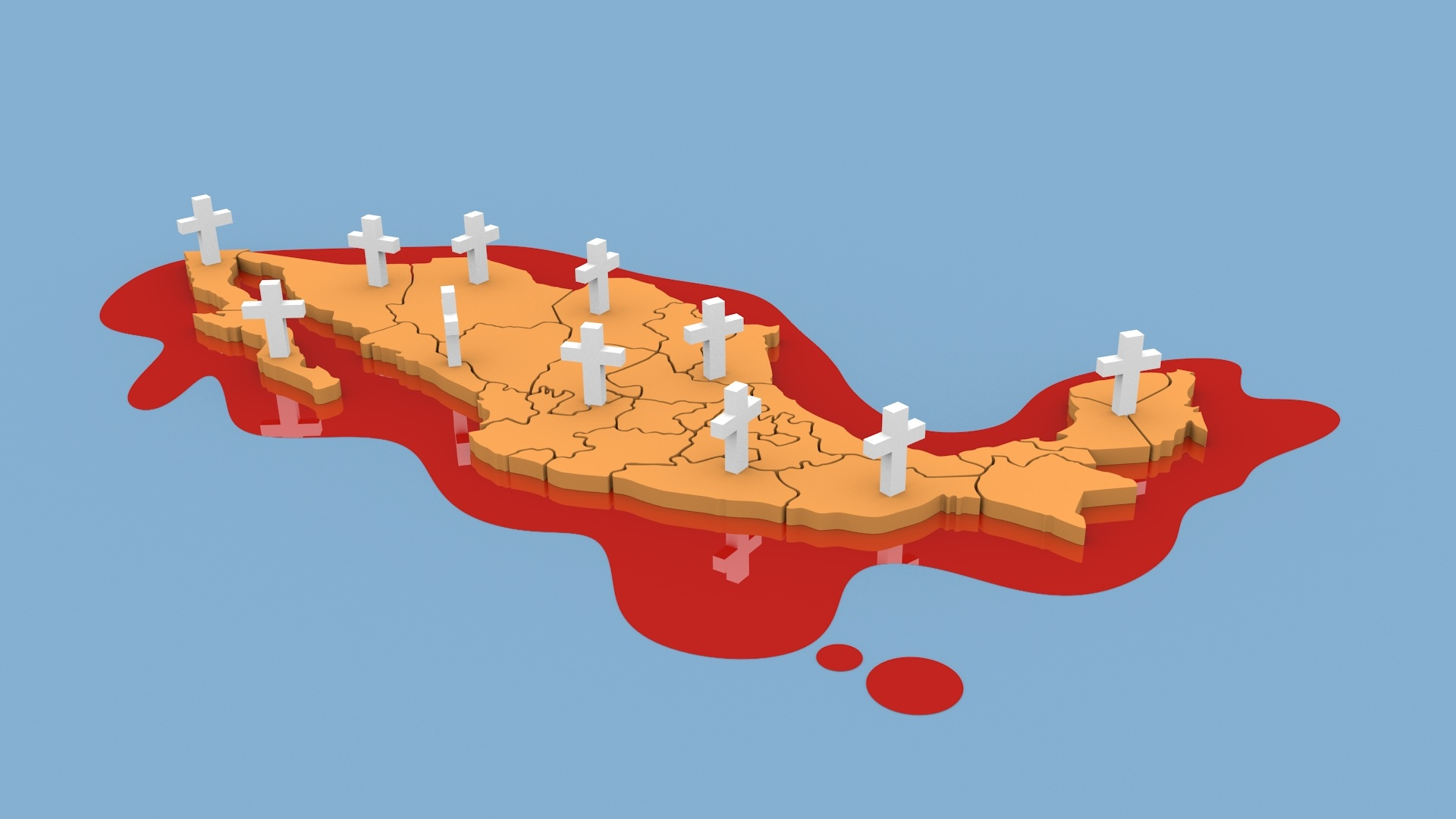
- Date: 21 March 1973
- Meeting no.: 1,704
- Code: S/RES/330 (Document)
- Subject: On Peace and Security in Latin America
- Voting summary: 12 voted for; None voted against; 3 abstained
- Result: Adopted

Security Council composition
- Permanent members: China; France; Soviet Union; United Kingdom; United States
- Non-permanent members: Australia; Austria; Guinea; India; Indonesia; Kenya; Panama; Peru; Sudan; Yugoslavia

United Nations Security Council Resolution 330, adopted on March 21, 1973, after citing a number of General Assembly resolutions concerning the exploitation of one state's natural resources by parties of another state, the Council urged states to adopt appropriate measures to impede activities by enterprises which deliberately attempt to coerce Latin American countries. The Resolution then requests states to refrain from using or encouraging the use of any type of coercive measures against states in the region in order to maintain and strengthen peace and security in Latin America.

The resolution, adopted at a meeting in Panama City, was approved with 12 votes to none and three abstentions from France, the United Kingdom and United States.

Other issues debated while in Panama included the country's sovereignty over the Panama Canal, the continued existence of colonialism and neo-colonialism, problems of economic development and dependence and the Treaty for the Prohibition of Nuclear Weapons in Latin America and the Caribbean. A resolution on the Panama Canal failed to be adopted due to opposition from the United States.

== See also ==
- List of United Nations Security Council Resolutions 301 to 400 (1971–1976)
