= United Nations Security Council Resolution 308 =

UN Security Council Resolution 308
- Date: 19 January 1972
- Meeting no.: 1,626
- Code: S/RES/308 (Document)
- Subject: Request of the Organisation of African Unity concerning the holding of meetings of the Security Council in an African Capital
- Result: Adopted

Security Council composition
- Permanent members: China; France; Soviet Union; United Kingdom; United States
- Non-permanent members: Argentina; Belgium; Guinea; India; Italy; Japan; Panama; Somalia; Sudan; Yugoslavia

United Nations Security Council Resolution 308 was adopted on January 19, 1972, after a request by the Organisation of African Unity to hold meetings of the Council in an African capital. The Council decided to hold meetings in Addis Ababa from January 28 to a date no later than February 4. The Council expressed its gratitude to Ethiopia for its promises for host the meetings and to provide certain facilities without cost.

The President of the Council announced the resolution was approved unanimously in the absence of any objection.

In accordance with the resolution, the Council's 1627th to 1638th meetings were held in the Ethiopian capital, to discuss several issues relating to peace and security in Africa.

== See also ==
- List of United Nations Security Council Resolutions 301 to 400 (1971–1976)
