= United Nations Security Council Resolution 334 =

UN Security Council Resolution 334
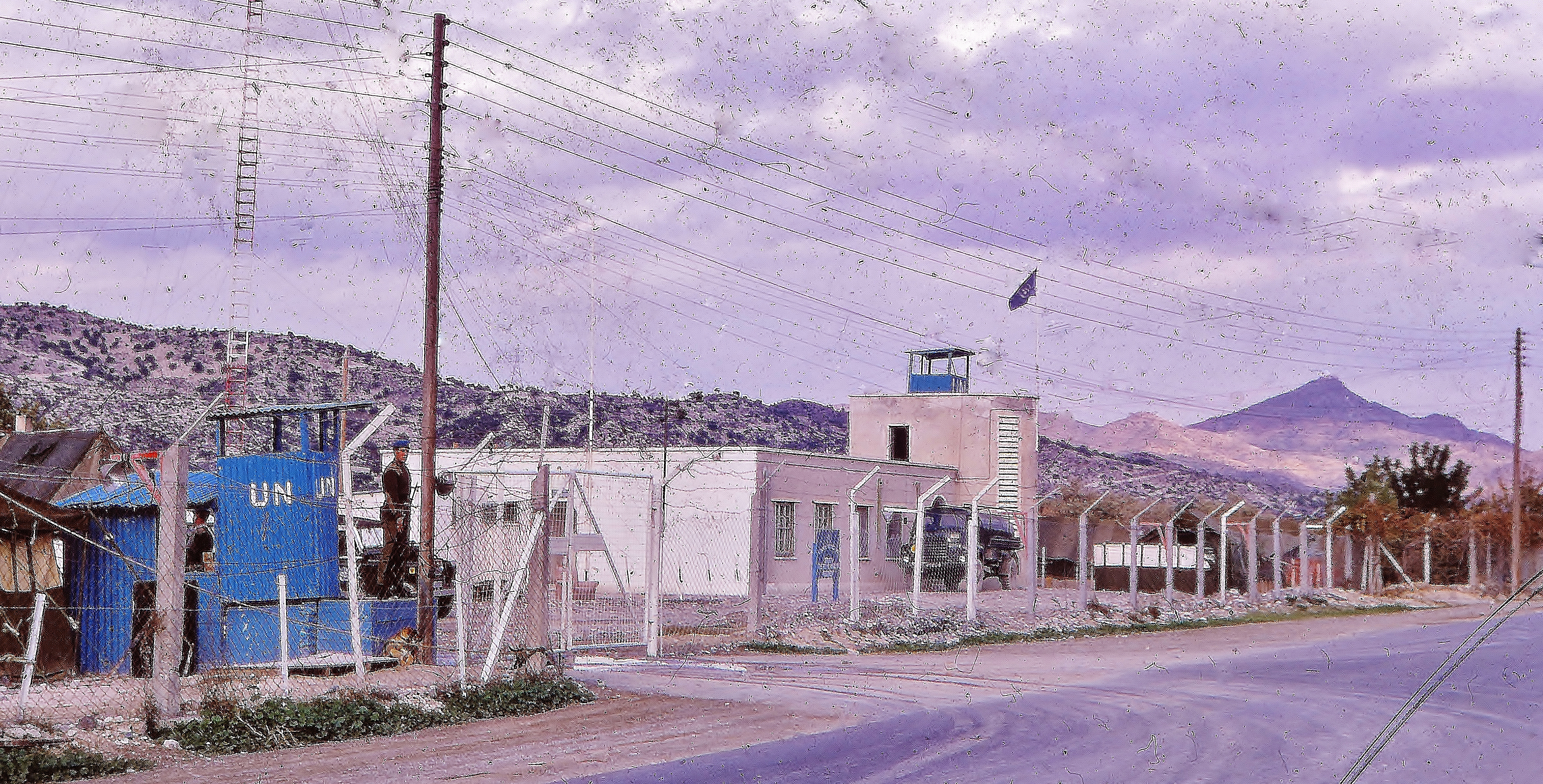
- UN base in Cyprus
- Date: 15 June 1973
- Meeting no.: 1,727
- Code: S/RES/334 (Document)
- Subject: On Extension of the Stationing in Cyprus
- Voting summary: 14 voted for; None voted against; 1 abstained
- Result: Adopted

Security Council composition
- Permanent members: China; France; Soviet Union; United Kingdom; United States
- Non-permanent members: Australia; Austria; Guinea; India; Indonesia; Kenya; Panama; Peru; Sudan; Yugoslavia

United Nations Security Council Resolution 334, adopted on June 15, 1973, after reaffirming previous resolutions on the topic, and noting recent encouraging developments, the Council extended the stationing in Cyprus of the United Nations Peacekeeping Force in Cyprus for a further period, now ending on December 15, 1973. The Council also called upon the parties directly concerned to continue to act with the utmost restraint and to co-operate fully with the peacekeeping force.

The resolution was adopted with 14 votes to none, while the People's Republic of China abstained.

== See also ==
- Cyprus dispute
- List of United Nations Security Council Resolutions 301 to 400 (1971–1976)
