= United Nations Security Council Resolution 348 =

UN Security Council Resolution 348
- Date: 28 May 1974
- Meeting no.: 1,770
- Code: S/RES/348 (Document)
- Subject: Iran-Iraq
- Voting summary: 14 voted for; None voted against; None abstained; 1 present not voting
- Result: Adopted

Security Council composition
- Permanent members: China; France; Soviet Union; United Kingdom; United States
- Non-permanent members: Australia; Austria; Byelorussian SSR; Cameroon; Costa Rica; Indonesia; Iraq; Kenya; Mauritania; Peru

United Nations Security Council Resolution 348, adopted on May 28, 1974, after a report from the Secretary-General, the Council welcomed the determination of Iran and Iraq to de-escalate the situation and improve relations (diplomatic relations were broken off by Iraq in 1971 over disputed Persian Gulf Islands). The resolution went on to state that both parties had agreed to a strict observance of the March 7 cease-fire agreement, to withdraw concentrations of armed forces along the entire border, the creation of a favorable atmosphere and an early resumption of conversations to settle all bilateral issues.

Resolution 348 was adopted with 14 votes to none; the People's Republic of China did not participate in voting.

== See also ==
- 1974–75 Shatt al-Arab conflict
- Background to the Iran–Iraq War
- Iran–Iraq relations
- List of United Nations Security Council Resolutions 301 to 400 (1971–1976)
