= United Nations Security Council Resolution 310 =

UN Security Council Resolution 310
- Date: 4 February 1972
- Meeting no.: 1,638
- Code: S/RES/310 (Document)
- Subject: The situation in Namibia
- Voting summary: 13 voted for; None voted against; 2 abstained
- Result: Adopted

Security Council composition
- Permanent members: China; France; Soviet Union; United Kingdom; United States
- Non-permanent members: Argentina; Belgium; Guinea; India; Italy; Japan; Panama; Somalia; Sudan; Yugoslavia

United Nations Security Council Resolution 310, adopted on February 4, 1972, after reaffirming previous resolutions on the topic, the Council strongly condemned repressive measures against the African laborers in Namibia and called upon all nations and corporations operating in Namibia to use whatever means available to ensure that operations there conform to the Universal Declaration of Human Rights.

The Council ended by condemning South Africa for the continued presence of its police and military forces and decided that if South Africa failed to abide by the present resolution it would meet immediately to decide upon effective steps and measures to implement it and requested the Secretary-General report back to them no later than July 31.

The resolution was adopted by 13 votes; France and the United Kingdom abstained from voting.

== See also ==
- List of United Nations Security Council Resolutions 301 to 400 (1971–1976)
- South West Africa
