= United Nations Security Council Resolution 302 =

UN Security Council Resolution 302
- Date: 24 November 1971
- Meeting no.: 1,601
- Code: S/RES/302 (Document)
- Subject: Complaint by Senegal
- Voting summary: 14 voted for; None voted against; 1 abstained
- Result: Adopted

Security Council composition
- Permanent members: China; France; Soviet Union; United Kingdom; United States
- Non-permanent members: Argentina; Belgium; Burundi; Italy; Japan; Nicaragua; Poland; Sierra Leone; Somalia; Syria

United Nations Security Council Resolution 302, adopted on November 24, 1971, after reaffirming previous resolutions on the topic, the Council expressed its appreciation for the work accomplished by the Special Mission established in resolution 294. The Council deplored the lack of co-operation with the Special Mission by the Portuguese and called upon its government to take effective measures so that the territorial integrity of Senegal would be respected and to prevent acts of violence and destruction against the territory and its people.

The Council further called on Portugal respect the inalienable right to self-determination and independence of the people of Guinea (Bissau), requested the President of the Security Council and the Secretary-General report back on the implementation of the resolution and declared that if Portugal failed to comply with the provisions of the resolution the Council would meet to consider the initiatives and steps that the situation requires.

Resolution 302 was adopted by 14 votes to none; the United States abstained from voting. This was the first resolution that the Security Council adopted after the Chinese seat was transferred from representatives of the Republic of China to those of the People's Republic of China.

== See also ==
- Guinea-Bissau War of Independence
- List of United Nations Security Council Resolutions 301 to 400 (1971–1976)
- Portuguese Empire
