= United Nations Security Council Resolution 344 =

UN Security Council Resolution 344
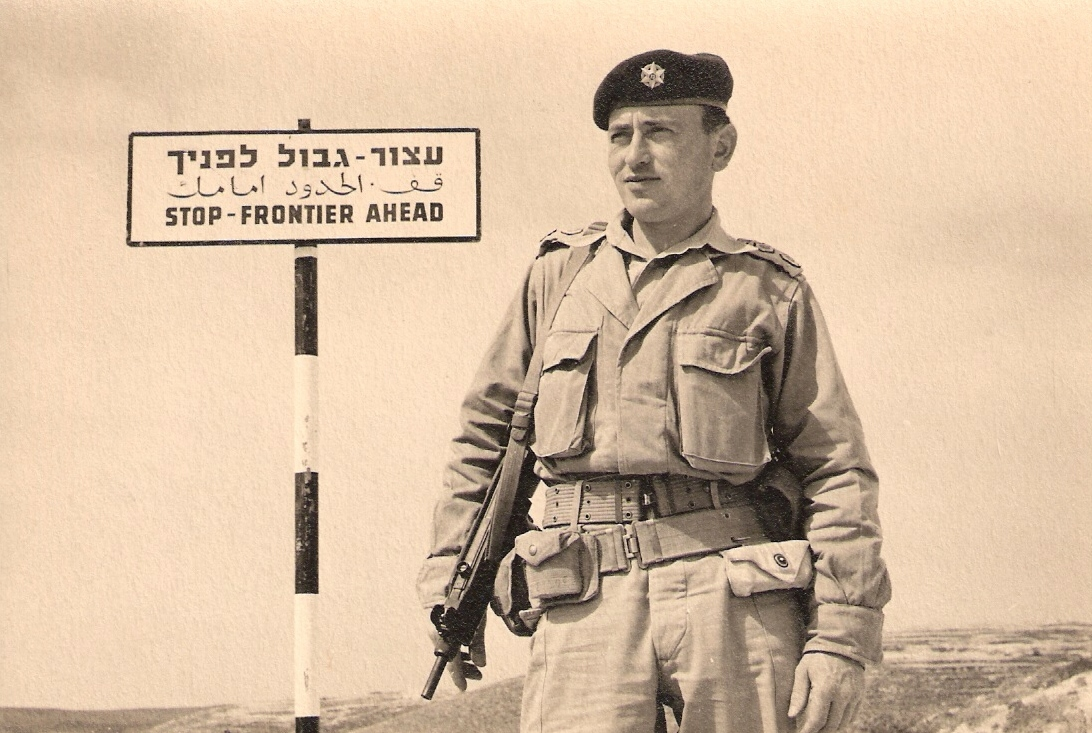
- Border soldier in Israel
- Date: 15 December 1973
- Meeting no.: 1,760
- Code: S/RES/344 (Document)
- Subject: Peace Conference in the Middle East
- Voting summary: 10 voted for; None voted against; 4 abstained
- Result: Adopted

Security Council composition
- Permanent members: China; France; Soviet Union; United Kingdom; United States
- Non-permanent members: Australia; Austria; Guinea; India; Indonesia; Kenya; Panama; Peru; Sudan; Yugoslavia

United Nations Security Council Resolution 344, adopted on December 15, 1973, on the eve of the peace conference arranged for in resolution 338, the Council expressed the hope that speedy progress would be made toward the establishment of the just and durable peace in the Middle East. The Council also expressed its confidence that the Secretary-General would play a full and effective role at the conference and requested that he keep the Council informed on the developments in negotiations.

The resolution was adopted with 10 votes to none; with 4 abstentions from France, the Soviet Union, United Kingdom and United States.

== See also ==
- List of United Nations Security Council Resolutions 301 to 400 (1971–1976)
