= United Nations Security Council Resolution 369 =

1975 UNSC resolution on Israel–Syria

UN Security Council Resolution 369
- The Middle East
- Date: 28 May 1975
- Meeting no.: 1,822
- Code: S/RES/369 (Document)
- Subject: Israel-Syria
- Voting summary: 13 voted for; None voted against; None abstained
- Result: Adopted

Security Council composition
- Permanent members: China; France; Soviet Union; United Kingdom; United States
- Non-permanent members: Byelorussian SSR; Cameroon; Costa Rica; Guyana; Iraq; Italy; Japan; Mauritania; Sweden; Tanzania

United Nations Security Council Resolution 369, adopted on May 28, 1975, expressed concern over the prevailing state of tensions between Israel and Syria and reaffirmed that the two previous agreements on disengagements of forces were only a step towards the implementation of resolution 338. The resolution then decided to call upon the parties concerned to immediately implement resolution 338, renewed the mandate of the United Nations Disengagement Observer Force for another 6 months and requested the Secretary-General submit a report on the situation at the end of those 6 months.

The resolution was adopted by 13 votes; China and Iraq did not participate in the vote.

== See also ==
- Arab–Israeli conflict
- Israel–Syria relations
- List of United Nations Security Council Resolutions 301 to 400 (1971–1976)
- Yom Kippur War
