= United Nations Security Council Resolution 364 =

UN Security Council Resolution 364
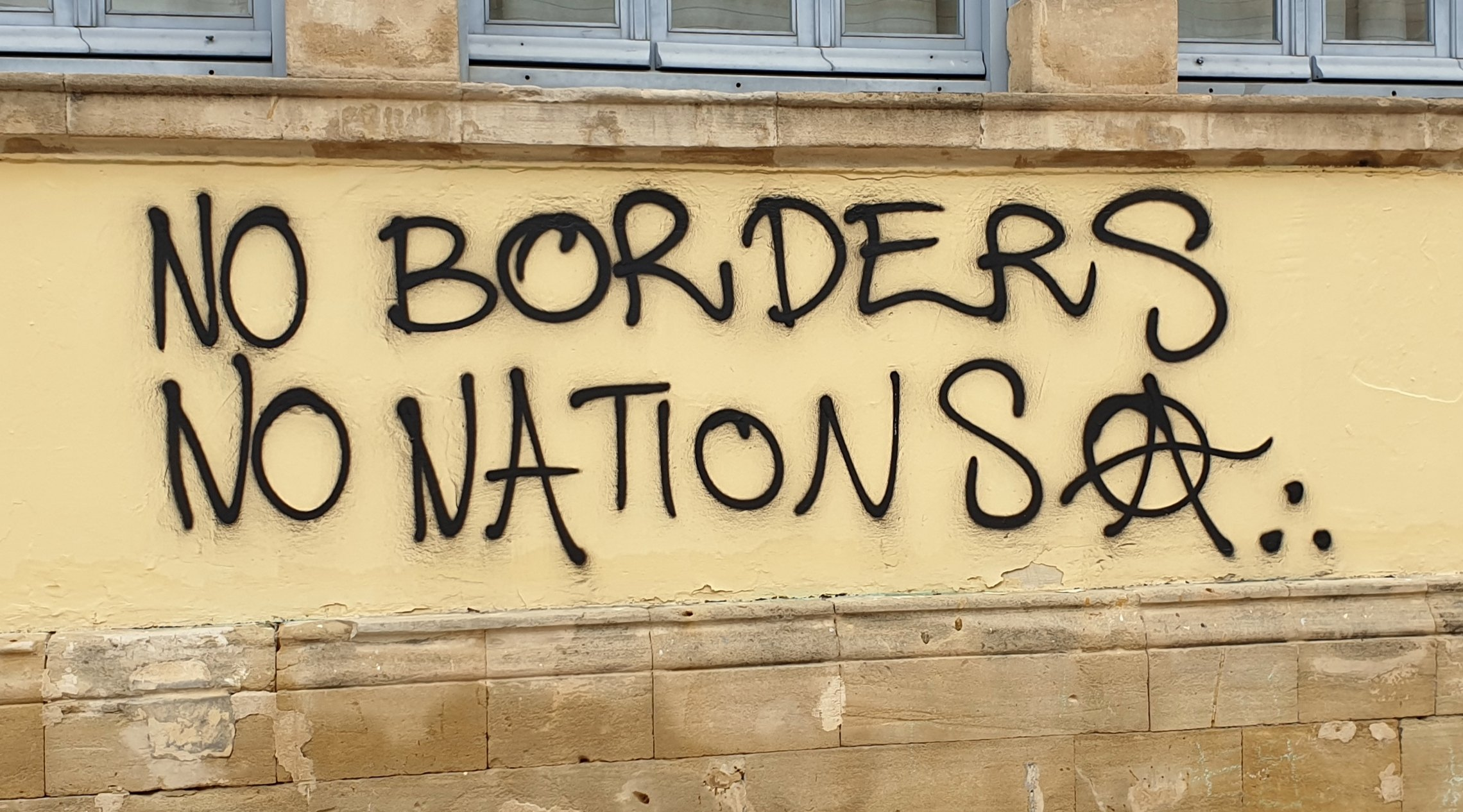
- The division of Cyprus is heavily criticized
- Date: 13 December 1974
- Meeting no.: 1,810
- Code: S/RES/364 (Document)
- Subject: Cyprus
- Voting summary: 14 voted for; None voted against; None abstained
- Result: Adopted

Security Council composition
- Permanent members: China; France; Soviet Union; United Kingdom; United States
- Non-permanent members: Australia; Austria; Byelorussian SSR; Cameroon; Costa Rica; Indonesia; Iraq; Kenya; Mauritania; Peru

United Nations Security Council Resolution 364, adopted on December 13, 1974, noted reports from the Secretary-General and Government of Cyprus about the prevailing conditions on the island, as well as General Assembly resolution 3212 and previous resolutions.

The Council then extended the stationing of the United Nations Peace-keeping Force in Cyprus for another six months until June 15, 1975, in the expectation that by then sufficient progress towards a final solution would make at least a partial withdrawal possible and again appealed to all parties to the conflict to extend their full co-operation to the Force.

The resolution was adopted with 14 votes to none; China did not participate in voting.

== See also ==
- Cyprus dispute
- List of United Nations Security Council Resolutions 301 to 400 (1971–1976)
- Turkish Invasion of Cyprus
