= United Nations Security Council Resolution 352 =

UN Security Council Resolution 352
- Location of Grenada
- Date: 21 June 1974
- Meeting no.: 1,778
- Code: S/RES/352 (Document)
- Subject: New member: Grenada
- Voting summary: 15 voted for; None voted against; None abstained
- Result: Adopted

Security Council composition
- Permanent members: China; France; Soviet Union; United Kingdom; United States
- Non-permanent members: Australia; Austria; Byelorussian SSR; Cameroon; Costa Rica; Indonesia; Iraq; Kenya; Mauritania; Peru

United Nations Security Council Resolution 352, adopted on June 21, 1974, after examining the application of Grenada for membership in the United Nations, the Council recommended to the General Assembly that Grenada be admitted.

== See also ==
- List of United Nations Security Council Resolutions 301 to 400 (1971–1976)
