= United Nations Security Council Resolution 386 =

UN Security Council Resolution 386
- Date: 17 March 1976
- Meeting no.: 1,892
- Code: S/RES/386 (Document)
- Subject: The Situation in Rhodesia
- Voting summary: 15 voted for; None voted against; None abstained
- Result: Adopted

Security Council composition
- Permanent members: China; France; Soviet Union; United Kingdom; United States
- Non-permanent members: Benin; Guyana; Italy; Japan; Libya; Pakistan; Panama; Romania; Sweden; Tanzania

United Nations Security Council Resolution 386, adopted unanimously on March 17, 1976, noted statements made by the President and Minister for Foreign Affairs of the People's Republic of Mozambique and also expressed its concern regarding the situation created by the provocative, aggressive acts committed by the illegal minority regime in Rhodesia. The Council reaffirmed their earlier work regarding Rhodesia, including their resolutions imposing sanctions on that country and noted their appreciation with Mozambique's co-operation with that plan. The Resolution then condemns Rhodesia's aggressive acts, including military incursions, against Mozambique and noted the urgent and special economic need of Mozambique who arose from its implementation of resolution 253.

The Council appealed states to provide immediate assistance to Mozambique, requested that various agencies of the UN, including the UNDP, the Food Program, the World Bank and the IMF assist Mozambique. Finally, the Resolution requests the Secretary-General organize the effort to overcome the economic difficulties that had befallen Mozambique due to its applications of economic sanctions against Rhodesia.

== See also ==
- List of United Nations Security Council Resolutions 301 to 400 (1971–1976)
