= United Nations Security Council Resolution 366 =

UN Security Council Resolution 366
- Location of South West Africa (now Namibia)
- Date: 17 December 1974
- Meeting no.: 1,811
- Code: S/RES/366 (Document)
- Subject: Namibia
- Voting summary: 15 voted for; None voted against; None abstained
- Result: Adopted

Security Council composition
- Permanent members: China; France; Soviet Union; United Kingdom; United States
- Non-permanent members: Australia; Austria; Byelorussian SSR; Cameroon; Costa Rica; Indonesia; Iraq; Kenya; Mauritania; Peru

United Nations Security Council Resolution 366 was adopted unanimously on December 17, 1974, after its previous resolutions and General Assembly Resolution 2145 which terminated South Africa's Mandate over Namibia. The Security Council was concerned with South Africa's continued occupation of the territory and its brutal repression of its people.

The Council condemned South Africa's continued occupation of the land and its illegal application of South African discriminatory laws in Namibia and demanded that South Africa make some declaration that it would comply with international law. The Resolution demanded that South Africa take the necessary steps to effect the withdrawal and release political prisoners from Namibia as well as abolishing the application of racially discriminatory laws and practices.

== See also ==
- History of Namibia
- List of United Nations Security Council Resolutions 301 to 400 (1971–1976)
- Namibia – South Africa relations
- South West Africa
