= United Nations Security Council Resolution 374 =

UN Security Council Resolution 374
- Location of Mozambique
- Date: 18 August 1975
- Meeting no.: 1,838
- Code: S/RES/374 (Document)
- Subject: New member: Mozambique
- Voting summary: 15 voted for; None voted against; None abstained
- Result: Adopted

Security Council composition
- Permanent members: China; France; Soviet Union; United Kingdom; United States
- Non-permanent members: Byelorussian SSR; Cameroon; Costa Rica; Guyana; Iraq; Italy; Japan; Mauritania; Sweden; Tanzania

United Nations Security Council Resolution 374, adopted on August 18, 1975, was the unanimous recommendation of the Council to the General Assembly that the People's Republic of Mozambique be admitted into the United Nations, after the Council's examination the application of the People's Republic of Mozambique (now the Republic of Mozambique) for membership.

== See also ==
- List of United Nations Security Council Resolutions 301 to 400 (1971–1976)
