= United Nations Security Council Resolution 373 =

UN Security Council Resolution 373
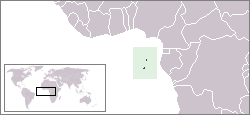
- Location of São Tomé and Príncipe
- Date: 18 August 1975
- Meeting no.: 1,838
- Code: S/RES/373 (Document)
- Subject: New member: São Tomé and Príncipe
- Voting summary: 15 voted for; None voted against; None abstained
- Result: Adopted

Security Council composition
- Permanent members: China; France; Soviet Union; United Kingdom; United States
- Non-permanent members: Byelorussian SSR; Cameroon; Costa Rica; Guyana; Iraq; Italy; Japan; Mauritania; Sweden; Tanzania

United Nations Security Council Resolution 373, adopted unanimously on August 18, 1975, after examining the application of the Democratic Republic of São Tomé and Príncipe for membership in the United Nations, the Council recommended to the General Assembly that the Democratic Republic of São Tomé and Príncipe be admitted.

== See also ==
- List of United Nations Security Council Resolutions 301 to 400 (1971–1976)
