= United Nations Security Council Resolution 343 =

UN Security Council Resolution 343
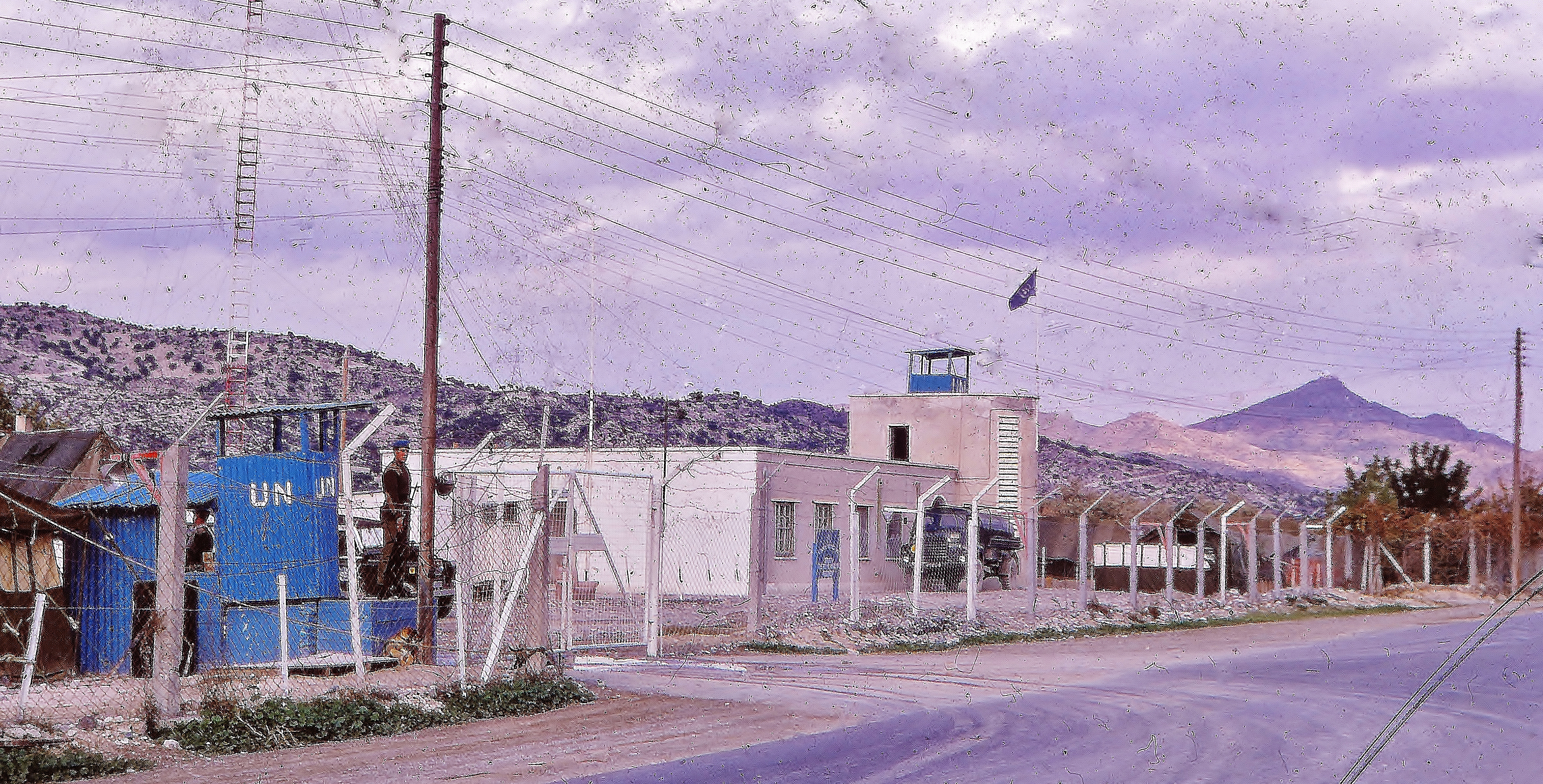
- UN base in Cyprus
- Date: 14 December 1973
- Meeting no.: 1,759
- Code: S/RES/343 (Document)
- Subject: The Cyprus Question
- Voting summary: 14 voted for; None voted against; 1 abstained
- Result: Adopted

Security Council composition
- Permanent members: China; France; Soviet Union; United Kingdom; United States
- Non-permanent members: Australia; Austria; Guinea; India; Indonesia; Kenya; Panama; Peru; Sudan; Yugoslavia

United Nations Security Council Resolution 343, adopted on December 14, 1973, after reaffirming previous resolutions on the topic, and noting recent encouraging developments, the Council extended the stationing in Cyprus of the United Nations Peacekeeping Force in Cyprus for a further period, now ending on June 15, 1974. The Council also called upon the parties directly concerned to continue to act with the utmost restraint and to co-operate fully with the peacekeeping force.

Resolution 343 was adopted by 14 votes to none, with one abstention from the People's Republic of China.

== See also ==
- Cyprus dispute
- List of United Nations Security Council Resolutions 301 to 400 (1971–1976)
