= United Nations Security Council Resolution 333 =

UN Security Council Resolution 333
- Date: 22 May 1973
- Meeting no.: 1,716
- Code: S/RES/333 (Document)
- Subject: Southern Rhodesia
- Voting summary: 12 voted for; None voted against; 3 abstained
- Result: Adopted

Security Council composition
- Permanent members: China; France; Soviet Union; United Kingdom; United States
- Non-permanent members: Australia; Austria; Guinea; India; Indonesia; Kenya; Panama; Peru; Sudan; Yugoslavia

United Nations Security Council Resolution 333, adopted on May 22, 1973, after reiterating previous statements and admitting that previous measures had yet failed to bring about the end of the "illegal regime in Southern Rhodesia" the Council condemned South Africa and Portugal for failing to co-operate with the implementation of sanctions and requested that urgent action be taken to implement them. The Council then requested that states with legislation permitting importation from Rhodesia repeal it immediately and called upon states to enact and enforce legislation against any person who tries to evade of commit a breach of sanctions by:

(a) Importing and goods from Southern Rhodesia;
(b) Exporting any goods to Southern Rhodesia;
(c) Providing any facilities for transport of goods to and from Southern Rhodesia;
(d) Conducting of facilitating any transaction or trade that may enable Southern Rhodesia;
(e) Continuing to deal with clients in South Africa, Angola, Mozambique, Guinea (Bissau) and Namibia after it has become known that the clients are re-exporting the goods or components thereof to Southern Rhodesia, or that goods received from such clients are of Southern Rhodesian origin

The resolution goes on to request that states require very specific receipts for goods delivered to any of the nations listed in sub-clause e so as to ensure they were not resold in Rhodesia and ask states to forbid their insurance companies from ensuring anything bound for Rhodesia.

Resolution 333 was adopted by 12 votes to none; France, the United Kingdom and United States abstained.

== See also ==
- History of Rhodesia
- List of United Nations Security Council Resolutions 301 to 400 (1971–1976)
