= United Nations Security Council Resolution 394 =

UN Security Council Resolution 394
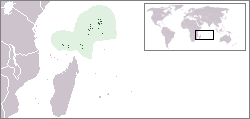
- Location of the Seychelles
- Date: 16 August 1976
- Meeting no.: 1,952
- Code: S/RES/394 (Document)
- Subject: Admission of new Members to the UN: the Seychelles
- Voting summary: 15 voted for; None voted against; None abstained
- Result: Adopted

Security Council composition
- Permanent members: China; France; Soviet Union; United Kingdom; United States
- Non-permanent members: Benin; Guyana; Italy; Japan; Libya; Pakistan; Panama; Romania; Sweden; Tanzania

United Nations Security Council Resolution 394, adopted unanimously on August 16, 1976, after examining the application of the Republic of the Seychelles for membership in the United Nations, the Council recommended to the General Assembly that the Seychelles be admitted.

== See also ==
- List of United Nations Security Council Resolutions 301 to 400 (1971–1976)
