= United Nations Security Council Resolution 346 =

UN Security Council Resolution 346
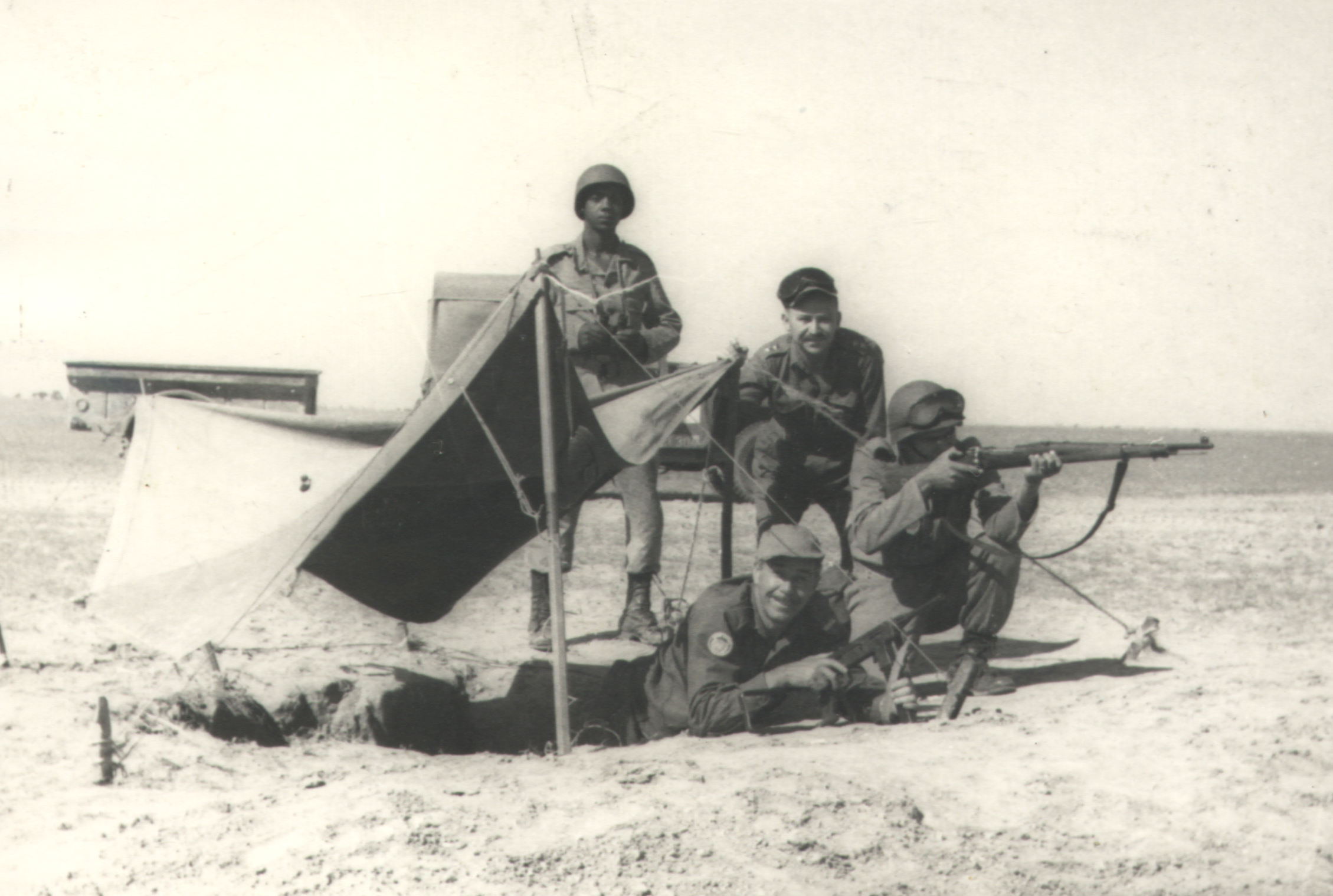
- UN troops
- Date: 8 April 1974
- Meeting no.: 1,765
- Code: S/RES/346 (Document)
- Subject: Egypt-Israel
- Voting summary: 13 voted for; None voted against; None abstained
- Result: Adopted

Security Council composition
- Permanent members: China; France; Soviet Union; United Kingdom; United States
- Non-permanent members: Australia; Austria; Byelorussian SSR; Cameroon; Costa Rica; Indonesia; Iraq; Kenya; Mauritania; Peru

United Nations Security Council Resolution 346, adopted on April 8, 1974, thanked the nations who contributed to the emergency force established in resolution 340 and agreed with the opinion of the Secretary-General; that the separation of the Egyptian and Israeli forces was only the beginning to a peaceful settlement of the issue and called upon member states to continue to support the emergency force.

The resolution was adopted unanimously with 13 votes to none, while two members, Iraq and the People's Republic of China, did not participate in the voting.

== See also ==
- List of United Nations Security Council Resolutions 301 to 400 (1971–1976)
- Yom Kippur War
