= United Nations Security Council Resolution 372 =

UN Security Council Resolution 372
- Location of Cape Verde
- Date: 18 August 1975
- Meeting no.: 1,838
- Code: S/RES/372 (Document)
- Subject: New member: Cape Verde
- Voting summary: 15 voted for; None voted against; None abstained
- Result: Adopted

Security Council composition
- Permanent members: China; France; Soviet Union; United Kingdom; United States
- Non-permanent members: Byelorussian SSR; Cameroon; Costa Rica; Guyana; Iraq; Italy; Japan; Mauritania; Sweden; Tanzania

United Nations Security Council Resolution 372, adopted unanimously on August 18, 1975, after examining the application of the Republic of Cape Verde for membership in the United Nations, the Council recommended to the General Assembly that the Republic of Cape Verde be admitted.

== See also ==
- List of United Nations Security Council Resolutions 301 to 400 (1971–1976)
