= United Nations Security Council Resolution 323 =

UN Security Council Resolution 323
- Date: 6 December 1972
- Meeting no.: 1,682
- Code: S/RES/323 (Document)
- Subject: The situation in Namibia
- Voting summary: 13 voted for; None voted against; 1 abstained
- Result: Adopted

Security Council composition
- Permanent members: China; France; Soviet Union; United Kingdom; United States
- Non-permanent members: Argentina; Belgium; Guinea; India; Italy; Japan; Panama; Somalia; Sudan; Yugoslavia

United Nations Security Council Resolution 323, adopted on December 6, 1972, after recalling previous resolutions and reaffirming the United Nations' responsibility for Namibia, the Council observed with satisfaction that Namibians had an opportunity of expressing their aspirations to representatives of the UN and noted that the overwhelming majority of the opinions of those consulted were in favor of the abolition of the "homelands policy" and accession to national independence. The Council expressed regret for South Africa's opaqueness regarding self-determination for Namibia and invited the Secretary-General to continue his valuable efforts to ensure that the people of Namibia exercise their right to self-determination and independence.

The Resolution also determined that immediately following the partial renewal of membership on the council, new representatives to fill the vacancies that would occur in the group established in accordance with resolution 309 would be appointed.

The resolution passed with 13 votes to none, while the Soviet Union abstained and the People's Republic of China did not participate in voting.

== See also ==
- List of United Nations Security Council Resolutions 301 to 400 (1971–1976)
- South West Africa
