= United Nations Security Council Resolution 378 =

UN Security Council Resolution 378
- The Middle East
- Date: 23 October 1975
- Meeting no.: 1,851
- Code: S/RES/378 (Document)
- Subject: Egypt-Israel
- Voting summary: 13 voted for; None voted against; None abstained
- Result: Adopted

Security Council composition
- Permanent members: China; France; Soviet Union; United Kingdom; United States
- Non-permanent members: Byelorussian SSR; Cameroon; Costa Rica; Guyana; Iraq; Italy; Japan; Mauritania; Sweden; Tanzania

United Nations Security Council Resolution 378, adopted on October 23, 1975, considered a report by the Secretary General and noted the developments in the situation in the Middle East. The Secretary General viewed any relaxation in the search for peace at that time to be especially dangerous and urged for a resolution to the situation, namely through the adaption of the plan laid out in resolution 338.

With that in mind, the Council called for all the parties concerned to immediately implement resolution 338, they renewed the mandate of the United Nations Emergency Force for another year until October 24, 1976, and requested the Secretary-General submit another report on the situation at the end of that year. The Council also expressed its confidence that the force would be maintained with "maximum efficiency and economy".

The resolution was adopted by 13 votes; China and Iraq did not participate in the vote.

== See also ==
- Arab–Israeli conflict
- Egypt–Israel relations
- List of United Nations Security Council Resolutions 301 to 400 (1971–1976)
- Yom Kippur War
