= United Nations Security Council Resolution 371 =

UN Security Council Resolution 371
- The Middle East
- Date: 24 July 1975
- Meeting no.: 1,833
- Code: S/RES/371 (Document)
- Subject: Egypt-Israel
- Voting summary: 13 voted for; None voted against; None abstained
- Result: Adopted

Security Council composition
- Permanent members: China; France; Soviet Union; United Kingdom; United States
- Non-permanent members: Byelorussian SSR; Cameroon; Costa Rica; Guyana; Iraq; Italy; Japan; Mauritania; Sweden; Tanzania

United Nations Security Council Resolution 371, adopted on July 24, 1975, recalling statements from officials of the Arab Republic of Egypt and a report by the Secretary-General regarding the United Nations Emergency Force, the Council expressed its concern at the lack of progress toward a lasting peace in the Middle East.

The Council then called upon all involved parties to implement resolution 338, it renewed the mandate for the Emergency Force for another 3 months until October 24, 1975, and requested that the Secretary-General submit a report on any progress regarding the situation before the expiration of the renewed mandate.

The resolution was adopted by 13 votes; China and Iraq did not participate in the voting.

== See also ==
- Arab–Israeli conflict
- List of United Nations Security Council Resolutions 301 to 400 (1971–1976)
