= United Nations Security Council Resolution 321 =

UN Security Council Resolution 321
- Date: 23 October 1972
- Meeting no.: 1,669
- Code: S/RES/321 (Document)
- Subject: Complaint by Senegal
- Voting summary: 12 voted for; None voted against; 3 abstained
- Result: Adopted

Security Council composition
- Permanent members: China; France; Soviet Union; United Kingdom; United States
- Non-permanent members: Argentina; Belgium; Guinea; India; Italy; Japan; Panama; Somalia; Sudan; Yugoslavia

United Nations Security Council Resolution 321, adopted on October 23, 1972, after reaffirming previous resolutions, the Council expressed its concern that Portugal persistently refused to comply with them. The Council attacked the latest cross-border action by the Portuguese army against Senegalese territory and demanded that the Portuguese cease any further acts of violence. The Council went on to reaffirm their position that Portugal's continued holding of colonies in Africa was unjust and that the native peoples of those colonies should be allowed self-determination.

The resolution was adopted with 12 votes to none, while Belgium, the United Kingdom and United States abstained.

== See also ==
- List of United Nations Security Council Resolutions 301 to 400 (1971–1976)
- Portuguese Colonial War
- Portuguese Empire
