= United Nations Security Council Resolution 391 =

UN Security Council Resolution 391
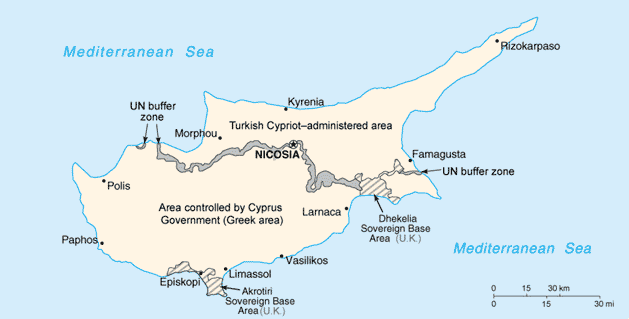
- Divided Cyprus
- Date: 15 June 1976
- Meeting no.: 1,927
- Code: S/RES/391 (Document)
- Subject: Cyprus
- Voting summary: 13 voted for; None voted against; None abstained
- Result: Adopted

Security Council composition
- Permanent members: China; France; Soviet Union; United Kingdom; United States
- Non-permanent members: Benin; Guyana; Italy; Japan; Libya; Pakistan; Panama; Romania; Sweden; Tanzania

United Nations Security Council Resolution 391, adopted on June 15, 1976, noted a report of the Secretary-General that, due to the existing circumstances, the presence of the United Nations Peacekeeping Force in Cyprus would continue to be essential for a peaceful settlement. The report further noted that the force, as well as its civil police were restricted in the north of the island and expressed its concerns regarding actions which could heighten tensions.

The Council reaffirmed its previous resolutions, expressed its concern over the situation, urged the involved parties to work together toward peace and once more extended the stationing of the Force in Cyprus until December 15, 1976.

Resolution 391 was adopted by 13 votes to none; Benin and China did not participate in the voting.

== See also ==
- Cyprus dispute
- List of United Nations Security Council Resolutions 301 to 400 (1971–1976)
- Turkish Invasion of Cyprus
