= United Nations Security Council Resolution 383 =

UN Security Council Resolution 383
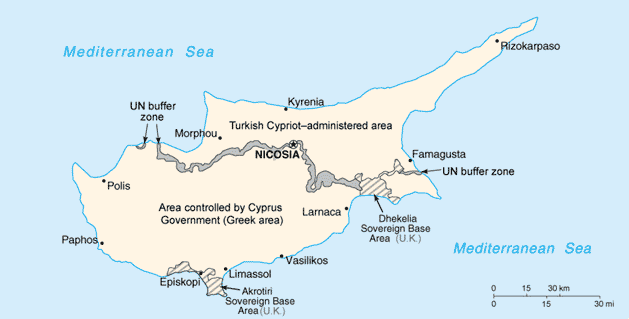
- Divided Cyprus
- Date: 13 December 1975
- Meeting no.: 1,863
- Code: S/RES/383 (Document)
- Subject: Cyprus
- Voting summary: 14 voted for; None voted against; None abstained
- Result: Adopted

Security Council composition
- Permanent members: China; France; Soviet Union; United Kingdom; United States
- Non-permanent members: Byelorussian SSR; Cameroon; Costa Rica; Guyana; Iraq; Italy; Japan; Mauritania; Sweden; Tanzania

United Nations Security Council Resolution 383, adopted on December 13, 1975, noted a report from the Secretary-General that in the existing circumstances the presence of the United Nations Peace-Keeping Force in Cyprus was still needed not only to maintain the cease-fire but also to facilitate the "continued search for a peaceful settlement". The Resolution noted the report of the prevailing conditions on the island and the concurrence of the parties concerned with the Secretary-General's recommendation of extending the stationing of the Force in Cyprus for another 6 months.

The Council then reaffirmed past resolutions on the topic and called for their effective implementation. The council also urged all parties concerned to act with the utmost restraint and extended, once more, the stationing of the Peace-Keeping Force in Cyprus until June 15, 1976. The Resolution concludes with an appeal to all parties concerned to extend their full co-operation to the Force and requested the Secretary-General continue the mission of his good offices and inform the Council of the progress made by submitting a report no later than March 31, 1976.

The resolution was adopted with 14 votes to none against; the People's Republic of China did not participate in voting.

== See also ==
- Cyprus dispute
- List of United Nations Security Council Resolutions 301 to 400 (1971–1976)
