= United Nations Security Council Resolution 349 =

UN Security Council Resolution 349
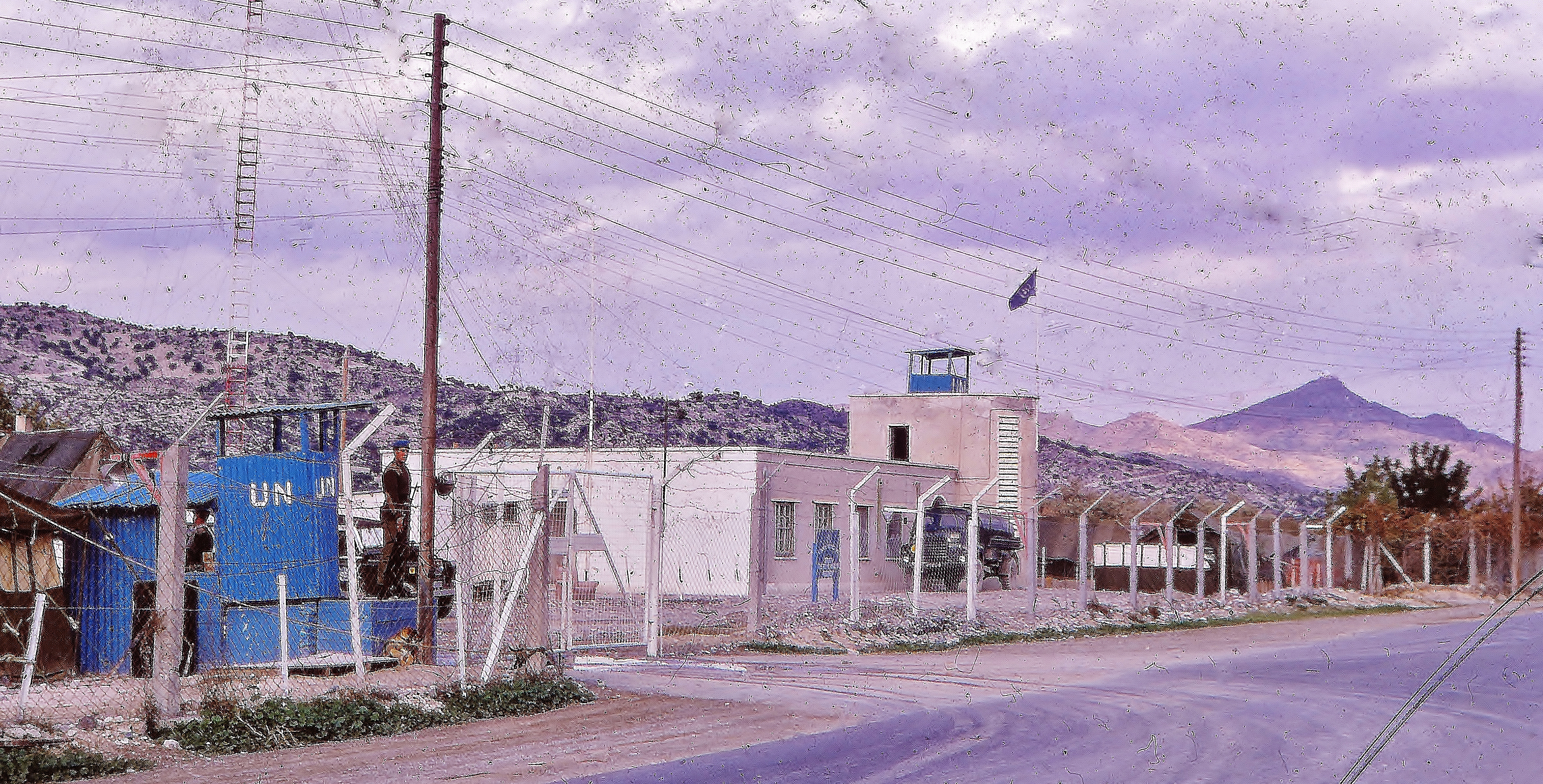
- UN base in Cyprus
- Date: 29 May 1974
- Meeting no.: 1,771
- Code: S/RES/349 (Document)
- Subject: Cyprus
- Voting summary: 14 voted for; None voted against; 1 abstained
- Result: Adopted

Security Council composition
- Permanent members: China; France; Soviet Union; United Kingdom; United States
- Non-permanent members: Australia; Austria; Byelorussian SSR; Cameroon; Costa Rica; Indonesia; Iraq; Kenya; Mauritania; Peru

United Nations Security Council Resolution 349, adopted on May 29, 1974, after reaffirming previous resolutions on the topic, and noting recent encouraging developments, the Council extended the stationing in Cyprus of the United Nations Peacekeeping Force in Cyprus for a further period, now ending on December 15, 1974. The Council also called upon the parties directly concerned to continue to act with the utmost restraint and to co-operate fully with the peacekeeping force.

The resolution was adopted by 14 votes to none, with one abstention from China.

== See also ==
- Cyprus dispute
- List of United Nations Security Council Resolutions 301 to 400 (1971–1976)
