= List of United Nations Security Council Resolutions 301 to 400 =

This is a list of United Nations Security Council Resolutions 301 to 400 adopted between 20 October 1971 and 7 December 1976.

Resolution	Date	Vote	Concerns
301	20 October 1971	13–0–2 (abstentions: France, United Kingdom)	Condemning the Bantustans in South West Africa (Namibia)
302	24 November 1971	14–0–1 (abstention: USA)	Special Mission and the Portuguese Empire
303	6 December 1971	11–0–4 (abstentions: France, Poland, USSR, United Kingdom)	Referring the India–Pakistan situation to the General Assembly
304	8 December 1971	Adopted 15–0–0	Admission of the United Arab Emirates
305	13 December 1971	Adopted 15–0–0	Extending the mandate of the United Nations Peacekeeping Force in Cyprus
306	21 December 1971	Adopted 15–0–0	Appointment of the Secretary-General Kurt Waldheim
307	21 December 1971	13–0–2 (abstention: Poland, USSR)	Calling for a ceasefire in Kashmir
308	19 January 1972	Adopted 15–0–0	Holding of meetings of the Security Council in Addis Ababa
309	4 February 1972	14–0–0 (China did not participate in the voting)	Secretary-General and contacts with South Africa regarding Namibia
310	4 February 1972	13–0–2 (abstentions: France, United Kingdom)	Condemns South Africa for repression in Namibia
311	4 February 1972	14–0–1 (abstention: France)	Condemns apartheid in South Africa; arms embargo
312	4 February 1972	9–0–6 (abstentions: Argentina, Belgium, France, Italy, United Kingdom, USA)	Calls on Portugal to end colonisation of territories
313	28 February 1972	Adopted 15–0–0	Calls on Israel to end action in Lebanon
314	28 February 1972	13–0–2 (abstentions: United Kingdom, USA)	Sanctions against Southern Rhodesia
315	15 June 1972	14–0–1 (abstention: China)	Extending peacekeeping operations in Cyprus
316	26 June 1972	13–0–2 (abstentions: Panama, USA)	Condemns Israel for its actions in Lebanon
317	21 July 1972	14–0–1 (abstention: USA)	Abductions of Lebanese and Syrian forces by Israel
318	28 July 1972	14–0–1 (abstention: USA)	States violating sanctions against Southern Rhodesia
319	1 August 1972	14–0–0 (China did not participate in the voting)	Secretary-General and Namibia
320	29 September 1972	13–0–2 (abstentions: United Kingdom, USA)	States violating sanctions against Southern Rhodesia
321	23 October 1972	12–0–3 (abstentions: Belgium, United Kingdom, USA)	Cross-border actions in Senegal by Portugal
322	22 November 1972	Adopted 15–0–0	Organisation of African Unity's recognition of revolutionary movements
323	6 December 1972	13–0–1 (abstention: USSR; China did not participate in the voting)	UN consultation with Namibian people
324	12 December 1972	14–0–1 (abstention: China)	Extending peacekeeping efforts in Cyprus
325	26 January 1973	Adopted 15–0–0	Security Council meetings in Panama City
326	2 February 1973	13–0–2 (abstentions: United Kingdom, USA)	Provocations by Southern Rhodesia and South Africa in Zambia
327	2 February 1973	14–0–1 (abstention: USSR)	Zambia's decision to impose sanctions on Rhodesia
328	10 March 1973	13–0–2 (abstentions: United Kingdom, USA)	Proposes conference with representatives of Zimbabwean people
329	10 March 1973	Adopted 15–0–0	Assistance to Zambia
330	21 March 1973	12–0–3 (abstentions: France, United Kingdom, USA)	Peace and security in Latin America
331	20 April 1973	Adopted 15–0–0	Requests report by Secretary-General on Middle East situation
332	21 April 1973	11–0–4 (abstentions: China, Guinea, USSR, USA)	Israeli–Lebanese conflict
333	22 May 1973	12–0–3 (abstentions: France, United Kingdom, USA)	Condemns South Africa and Portugal for not observing sanctions in Southern Rhodesia
334	16 June 1973	14–0–1 (abstention: China)	Extending peacekeeping operations in Cyprus
335	22 June 1973	Adopted 15–0–0	Admission of East and West Germany
336	18 July 1973	Adopted 15–0–0	Admission of the Bahamas
337	15 August 1973	Adopted 15-0-0	On seizure of a Lebanese airliner by Israel
338	22 October 1973	14–0–1 (abstention: China)	Yom Kippur War
339	23 October 1973	14–0–0 (China did not participate in the voting)	Ceasefire between Egypt and Israel
340	25 October 1973	14–0–0 (China did not participate in the voting)	UN Emergency Force for the Middle East
341	27 October 1973	14–0–0 (China did not participate in the voting)	Establishing the UN Emergency Force
342	11 December 1973	Adopted 15–0–0	Discontinuing efforts in Namibia relating to Resolution 309
343	14 December 1973	14–0–1 (abstention: China)	Extending peacekeeping operations in Cyprus
344	15 December 1973	10–0–4 (abstentions: France, USSR, United Kingdom, USA; China did not participate)	Conference on Middle East peace
345	17 January 1974	Adopted without vote	Chinese as a working language in the Security Council
346	8 April 1974	13–0–0 (China and Iraq did not participate in the voting)	Separation of Israeli and Egyptian forces; supporting Emergency Force
347	24 April 1974	13–0–0 (China and Iraq did not participate in the voting.)	Israel–Lebanon conflict
348	28 May 1974	14–0–0 (China did not participate in the voting.)	Iran–Iraq relations
349	29 May 1974	14–0–1 (abstention: China)	Extends peacekeeping mission in Cyprus
350	31 May 1974	13–0–0 (China and Iraq did not participate in the voting)	Establishment of the United Nations Disengagement Observer Force
351	10 June 1974	Adopted 15–0–0	Admission of Bangladesh
352	21 June 1974	Adopted 15–0–0	Admission of Grenada
353	20 July 1974	Adopted 15–0–0	Turkish invasion of Cyprus
354	23 July 1974	Adopted 15–0–0	Calls for ceasefire in Cyprus
355	1 August 1974	13–0–2 (abstentions: Byelorussia, USSR)	Ceasefire in Cyprus
356	12 August 1974	Adopted 15–0–0	Admission of Guinea-Bissau
357	14 August 1974	Adopted 15–0–0	Calls for ceasefire and negotiations in Cyprus
358	15 August 1974	Adopted 15–0–0	Deplores non-compliance with Resolution 357 in Cyprus
359	15 August 1974	14–0–0 (China did not participate in the voting)	Deplores killings of the peacekeeping forces in Cyprus
360	16 August 1974	11–0–3 (abstentions: Byelorussia, Iraq, USSR; China did not participate)	Formal disapproval of the unilateral military actions of Turkey against Cyprus
361	30 August 1974	Adopted 15–0–0	Humanitarian conditions in Cyprus
362	23 October 1974	13–0–0 (China and Iraq did not participate in the voting)	Extends United Nations Emergency Force in Middle East
363	29 November 1974	13–0–0 (China and Iraq did not participate in the voting)	Extends United Nations Disengagement Observer Force in Syria
364	13 December 1974	14–0–0 (China did not participate in the voting)	Extends peacekeeping operations in Cyprus
365	13 December 1974	Adopted "by consensus"	Endorses General Assembly Resolution 2312
366	17 December 1974	Adopted 15–0–0	Repression in Namibia by South Africa
367	12 March 1975	Adopted without vote	Unilateral declaration of a "Federated Turkish State"
368	17 April 1975	13–0–0 (China and Iraq did not participate in the voting)	Extends mandate of Emergency Force in Middle East
369	28 May 1975	13–0–0 (China and Iraq did not participate in the voting)	Implementation of Resolution 338
370	13 June 1975	14–0–0 (China did not participate in the voting)	Extends peacekeeping operations in Cyprus
371	24 July 1975	13–0–0 (China and Iraq did not participate in the voting)	Extends peacekeeping operations in the Middle East
372	18 August 1975	Adopted 15–0–0	Admission of Cape Verde
373	18 August 1975	Adopted 15–0–0	Admission of São Tomé and Príncipe
374	18 August 1975	Adopted 15–0–0	Admission of Mozambique
375	22 September 1975	Adopted 15–0–0	Admission of Papua New Guinea
376	17 October 1975	14–0–0 (France did not participate in voting)	Admission of Comoros
377	22 October 1975	Adopted 15–0–0	Western Sahara War
378	23 October 1975	13–0–0 (China and Iraq did not participate in voting)	Extends peacekeeping operations in the Middle East
379	2 November 1975	Adopted "by consensus"	Calls for calm in the Western Sahara
380	6 November 1975	Adopted "by consensus"	Condemns the Green March by Morocco
381	30 November 1975	13–0–0 (China and Iraq did not participate in voting)	Peace efforts in the Middle East
382	1 December 1975	Adopted 15–0–0	Admission of Suriname
383	13 December 1975	14–0–0 (China did not participate in voting)	Peacekeeping operations in Cyprus
384	22 December 1975	Adopted 15–0–0	Indonesian invasion of East Timor
385	30 January 1976	Adopted 15–0–0	Militarisation of Namibia by South Africa
386	17 March 1976	Adopted 15-0-0	Attacks on Mozambique by Southern Rhodesia
387	31 March 1976	9–0–5 (abstentions: France, Italy, Japan, United Kingdom, United States; China did not participate)	South African incursions into Angola
388	6 April 1976	Adopted 15–0–0	Rhodesian Bush War
389	22 April 1976	12–0–2 (abstentions: Japan, United States; Benin did not participate)	Indonesian occupation of East Timor
390	28 May 1976	13–0–0 (China, Libya did not participate in voting)	Peacekeeping efforts in the Middle East
391	15 June 1976	13–0–0 (Benin and China did not participate in voting)	Extends peacekeeping operations in Cyprus
392	19 June 1976	Adopted "by consensus"	South Africa and the Soweto uprising
393	30 July 1976	14–0–1 (abstention: United States)	South African attack in Zambia
394	16 August 1976	Adopted 15–0–0	Admission of Seychelles
395	25 August 1976	Adopted 15–0–0	Aegean dispute between Greece and Turkey
396	22 October 1976	13–0–0 (China and Libya did not participate in voting)	Extends peacekeeping operations in Middle East
397	22 November 1976	13–0–1 (abstention: United States; China did not participate in voting)	Admission of Angola to the United Nations
398	30 November 1976	12–0–0 (Benin, China, Libya did not participate in voting)	Israel and Syria
399	1 December 1976	Adopted 15–0–0	Admission of Western Samoa
400	7 December 1976	Adopted 13–0–2 (abstentions: Benin, China)	Appointment of Kurt Waldheim as Secretary General

== See also ==
- Lists of United Nations Security Council resolutions
- List of United Nations Security Council Resolutions 201 to 300
- List of United Nations Security Council Resolutions 401 to 500
