= United Nations Security Council Resolution 304 =

UN Security Council Resolution 304
- Date: 8 December 1971
- Meeting no.: 1,609
- Code: S/RES/304 (Document)
- Subject: Admission of new Members to the UN: United Arab Emirates
- Voting summary: 15 voted for; None voted against; None abstained
- Result: Adopted

Security Council composition
- Permanent members: China; France; Soviet Union; United Kingdom; United States
- Non-permanent members: Argentina; Belgium; Burundi; Italy; Japan; Nicaragua; Poland; Sierra Leone; Somalia; Syria

United Nations Security Council Resolution 304 was adopted unanimously on December 8, 1971. After examining the application of the United Arab Emirates for membership in the United Nations, the Council recommended to the General Assembly that the United Arab Emirates be admitted.

== See also ==
- List of United Nations Security Council Resolutions 301 to 400 (1971–1976)
