= United Nations Security Council Resolution 368 =

UN Security Council Resolution 368
- The Middle East
- Date: 17 April 1975
- Meeting no.: 1,821
- Code: S/RES/368 (Document)
- Subject: Egypt-Israel
- Voting summary: 13 voted for; None voted against; None abstained
- Result: Adopted

Security Council composition
- Permanent members: China; France; Soviet Union; United Kingdom; United States
- Non-permanent members: Byelorussian SSR; Cameroon; Costa Rica; Guyana; Iraq; Italy; Japan; Mauritania; Sweden; Tanzania

United Nations Security Council Resolution 368, adopted on April 17, 1975, recalled previous resolutions and considered a report from the Secretary-General before calling upon the parties involved in the prevailing state of tension in the aftermath of the Yom Kippur War to immediately implement resolution 338. The Council then renewed the mandate of the United Nations Emergency Force for another three months until July 24, 1975, and requested the Secretary-General submit a report on the developments in the situation and the measures taken to implement the resolution.

The resolution was adopted by 13 votes; China and Iraq did not participate in the vote.

== See also ==
- Arab–Israeli conflict
- Egypt–Israel relations
- List of United Nations Security Council Resolutions 301 to 400 (1971–1976)
- Yom Kippur War
