= United Nations Security Council Resolution 357 =

UN Security Council Resolution 357
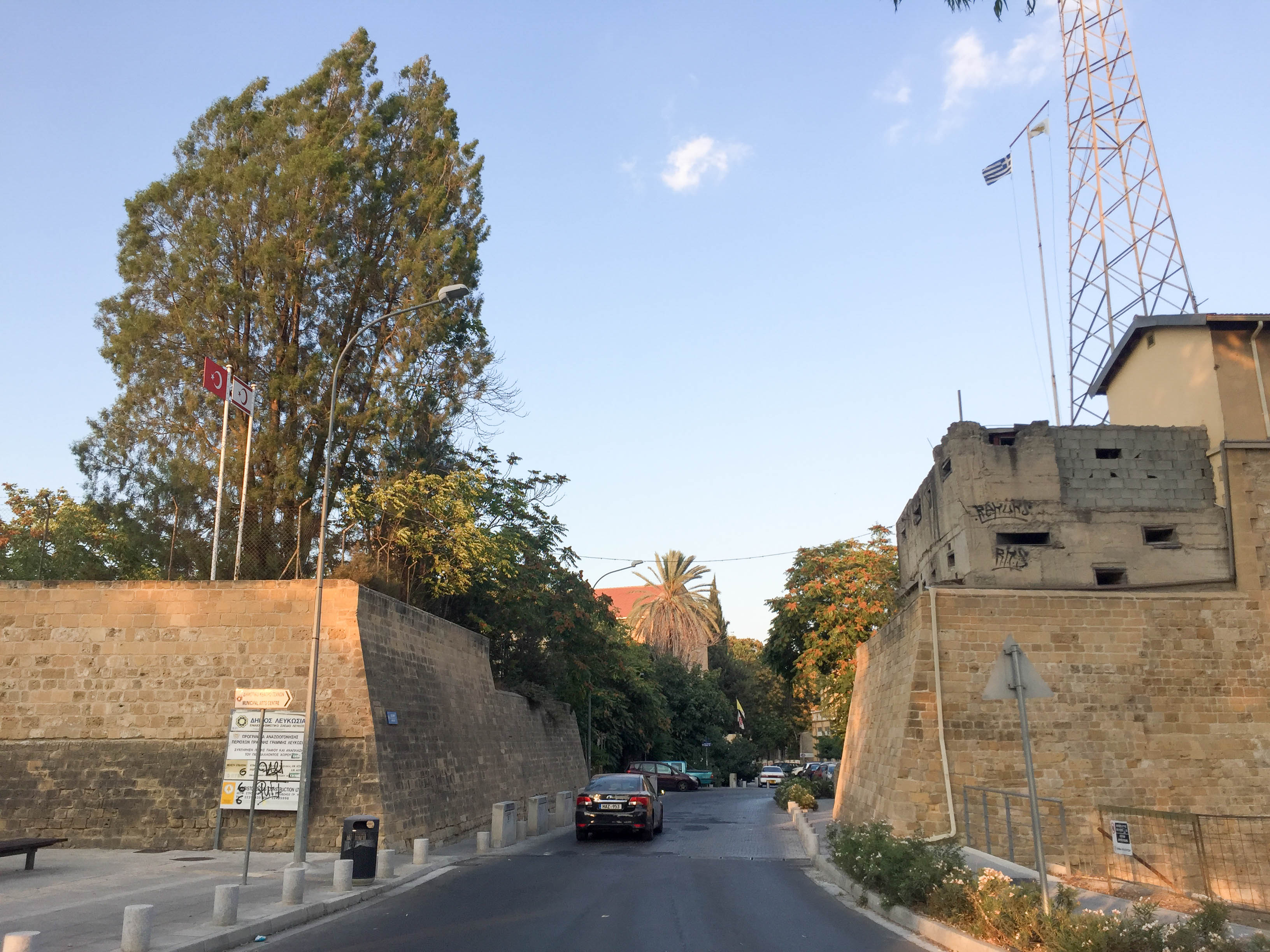
- Border street in Nicosia
- Date: 14 August 1974
- Meeting no.: 1,792
- Code: S/RES/357 (Document)
- Subject: Cyprus
- Voting summary: 15 voted for; None voted against; None abstained
- Result: Adopted

Security Council composition
- Permanent members: China; France; Soviet Union; United Kingdom; United States
- Non-permanent members: Australia; Austria; Byelorussian SSR; Cameroon; Costa Rica; Indonesia; Iraq; Kenya; Mauritania; Peru

United Nations Security Council Resolution 357, adopted unanimously on 14 August 1974, after reaffirming previous resolutions on the topic, the Council demanded that all parties present to the fighting in Cyprus cease all firing and military action. It called for the resumption of negotiations and decided to remain seized of the situation and on instant call to meet as necessary to consider what more effective measures may be required should the cease-fire fail.

== See also ==
- Cyprus dispute
- List of United Nations Security Council Resolutions 301 to 400 (1971–1976)
- Turkish invasion of Cyprus
