= List of United Nations Security Council resolutions concerning Cyprus =

The United Nations Security Council (UNSC) is the organ of the United Nations charged with maintaining peace and security among nations. While other organs of the United Nations only make recommendations to member governments, the Security Council has the power to make decisions; which member governments must carry out if they fall under Chapter VII of the under the United Nations Charter. The decisions of the council are known as United Nations Security Council Resolutions.

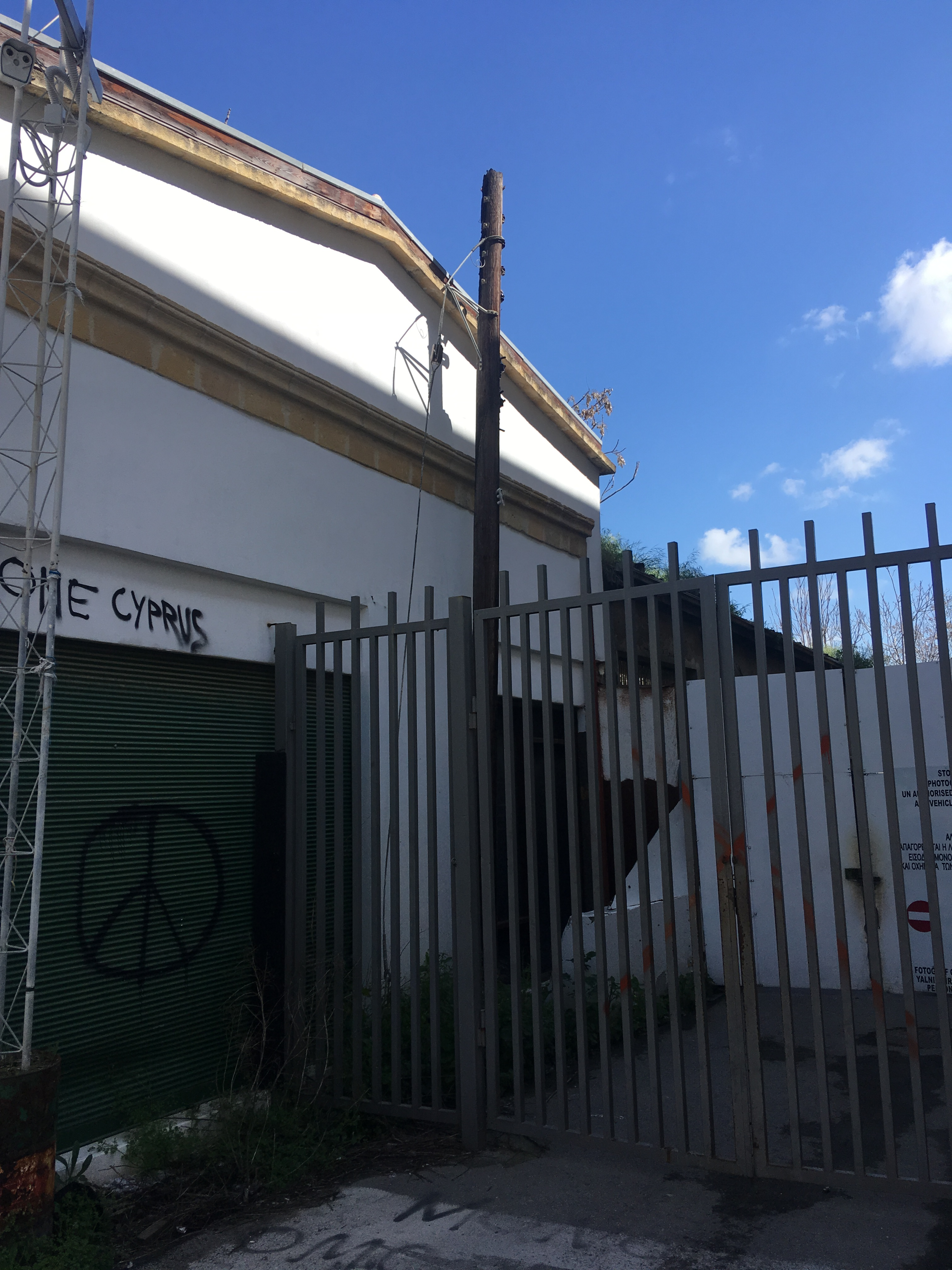
Buffer zone in Nicosia

A UN member State, is obligated to respect the United Nations Charter and UN members are bound by its articles. Cyprus claims that Turkey violates the charter against Republic of Cyprus. Turkey does not recognize the continued existence of the Republic of Cyprus, as established by the London and Zurich Agreements. Turkey refers to the Republic of Cyprus as the "Greek Cypriot administration" or "South Cyprus".

In 1974 Turkey invaded Cyprus, after a military coup staged by the Greek Junta against the lawfully elected Government of Cyprus under President Makarios. The Turkish army subsequently occupied ~38% of the territory of the island which to this day remains de facto divided with "Turkish Republic of Northern Cyprus" (TRNC) proclaimed in 1983 following a UDI by the Turkish Cypriots. The "TRNC" is an illegal entity as per UN Security Council Resolutions UN Security Council Resolution 541 and UN Security Council Resolution 550 and is recognized only by Turkey. The latter has, subsequently, been condemned by the European Court of Human Rights (ECHR) for human rights violations in Cyprus.

== Cyprus related resolutions ==
Resolution	Date	Vote	Concerns
155	23 August 1960	Adopted unanimously	Sovereign, island nation Republic of Cyprus becomes a United Nations Member.
186	4 March 1964	Adopted unanimously	Present situation in Cyprus likely to threaten international peace. Calls all member states to refrain from any action that would worsen the situation in the sovereign Republic of Cyprus. Asks the Government of Cyprus to take all additional measures necessary to stop violence and bloodshed in Cyprus. Recommends the creation, with the consent of the Republic of Cyprus, of a U.N peace keeping force.
187	13 March 1964	Adopted unanimously	Calls all member states to refrain from any action that would worsen the situation in the sovereign Republic of Cyprus. Noting the progress in regards to the establishment of a UN peace Keeping Force in Cyprus (already en route).
192	20 June 1964	Adopted unanimously	Calls all member states to comply with resolution 186 and 187. Expresses appreciation to all members that have contributed troops, police, supplies and financial support. With the consent of the Republic of Cyprus extends the presence of UN Force.
193	25 September 1964	Adopted unanimously	Reaffirms resolutions 186 and 187. Reaffirms the appeal by the President of the Security council worded as follows: "The Security Council has authorized me to make an urgent appeal to the Government of Turkey to cease instantly the bombardment of and the use of military force of any kind against Cyprus , and to the Government of Cyprus to order the armed forces under its control to cease firing immediately".
194	25 September 1964	Adopted unanimously	The council notes with satisfaction the cease fire being observed throughout Cyprus; asks all governments to stop all flights over the territory of the Republic of Cyprus in violation of its sovereignty. Asks all member to comply with resolution 193. Noting that the Republic of Cyprus has indicated its desire that the stationing of UN be extended; extends the presence of the Force.
198	18 December 1964	Adopted unanimously	Noting with satisfaction that the situation in Cyprus has improved and significant progress has been made. Noting that the Republic of Cyprus has indicated its desire that the stationing of UN be extended; extends the presence of UN Force.
353	20 July 1974 Timeline of the 1974 Invasion of Cyprus	Adopted unanimously	Deeply deploring the outbreak of violence and the continuing bloodshed. Gravely concerned about the situation which has led to a serious threat to international peace and security and which has created a most explosive situation in the whole of Eastern Mediterranean area. Equally concerned about the necessity to restore the constitutional structure of the Republic of Cyprus established and guaranteed by international agreements. Recalling resolution 186 and its subsequent resolutions on this matter: Calls upon all States to respect the sovereignty, independence, and territorial integrity of Cyprus.; Calls all parties to cease fire.; Demands an immediate end to the foreign military intervention in the Republic of Cyprus that is in contravention of point 1 above.; Requests the withdrawal of military personnel, Calls upon Greece, Turkey and the United Kingdom to enter into negotiations for a peace settlement without delay.
354	23 July 1974	Adopted unanimously	Reaffirming the provisions of its resolution 353, Demands all parties to the present fighting to comply immediately with the cease fire.
355	1 August 1974	Adopted unanimously	Deeply deplores the fact that members of the peace keeping force have been killed and wounded.
357	14 August 1974 Timeline of the 1974 Invasion of Cyprus	Adopted unanimously	Deeply deploring the resumption of fighting in Cyprus contrary to the provisions of Resolution 353. Reaffirms resolution 353.Decides to remain seized of the situation and on instant call to meet as necessary to consider what more effective measures may be required if the ceasefire is not respected
358	15 August 1974 Timeline of the 1974 Invasion of Cyprus	Adopted unanimously	The Security Council deeply concerned about the continuation of violence and bloodshed in Cyprus; Deeply deploring the non compliance with its resolution 357; recalls resolution 353, 354 and 355. Insists on full implementation of the above by all parties.
359	15 August 1974	14-0 (People's Republic of China did not participate in the voting.)	Deeply deplores the fact that members of the peace keeping force have been killed and wounded. Demands that all parties cooperate with the UN in carrying out its tasks, including humanitarian aid.
360	16 August 1974	11-0-3 (abstentions: Belarus, Iraq, USSR; People's Republic of China did not participate in the voting)	Formal disproval of military action against Republic of Cyprus Noting that all States have declared their respect for the sovereignty, independence and territorial integrity of the Republic Of Cyprus, Gravely concerned at the deterioration of the situation in Cyprus resulting from the further military operations which constituted a most serious threat to peace and security in the Eastern Mediterranean: “Records its formal disapproval of the unilateral military actions undertaken against the Republic of Cyprus”.; Urges the parties to comply... including the withdrawal without delay from the Republic of Cyprus of foreign military personnel; Urges the parties to resume without delay in an atmosphere of constructive cooperation the negotiations called for in 353 whose outcome should not be impeded or prejudged by the acquisition of advantages resulting from military operations.
361	30 August 1974	Adopted unanimously - People's Republic of China did not participate	Asking for Humanitarian aid for the Refugees. Noting that a large number of people in Cyprus have been displaced, calls upon all parties to do everything in their power to alleviate human suffering. Expresses its grave concern at the plight of the refugees as the result of the Turkish Invasion of Cyprus.
364	13 December 1974	Adopted unanimously by 14 to none -1 abstention	In search for peaceful settlement
365	13 December 1974	Adopted unanimously	Negotiations
367	12 March 1975	Adopted unanimously	In absence of progress condemns the unilateral decision that declares part of the Republic of Cyprus as "Turkish Federal state"
370	13 June 1975	Adopted unanimously	After request by the Republic of Cyprus extends the presence of UN Force
383	13 December 1975	Adopted by 14 to none	Cyprus
391	15 June 1976	Adopted by 13 to none	UN Peace keeping force restricted access to the occupied Cyprus
401	14 December 1976	Adopted by 13 to none	UN Peace keeping force restricted access to the occupied Cyprus
410	15 June 1977	Adopted by 14 to none	UN Peace keeping force still restricted access to the occupied part of Cyprus
414	15 September 1977	Adopted unanimously	Expresses concern at the lack of progress of intercommunal talks
422	15 December 1977	Adopted unanimously	Expresses concern at the lack of progress of intercommunal talks
430	16 June 1978	Adopted unanimously - People's Republic of China did not participate	Extends the stationing in Cyprus
440	27 November 1978	Adopted unanimously	Deeply concerned at the lack of progress in the solution of the Cyprus issue
443	14 December 1978	Adopted unanimously	Deeply concerned at the lack of progress in the solution of the Cyprus issue
451	15 June 1979	Adopted unanimously	Urges parties to proceed talks within the framework of the ten point agreement without delay
458	14 December 1979	Adopted unanimously	Urges parties to proceed talks within the framework of the ten point agreement without delay
472	13 June 1980		Urges parties to proceed talks
482	11 December 1980		
486	4 June 1981		
495	14 December 1981		
510	15 June 1982		
526	14 December 1982		
534	15 June 1983		
541	18 November 1983		
544	15 December 1983		
550	11 May 1984		
553	15 June 1984		
559	14 December 1984		
565	14 June 1985		
578	12 December 1985		
585	13 June 1986		
593	11 December 1986		
597	12 June 1987		
604	14 December 1987		
614	15 June 1988		
625	15 December 1988		
634	9 June 1989		
646	14 December 1989		
649	12 March 1990		
657	15 June 1990		
682	21 December 1990		
697	14 June 1990		
698	14 June 1990		
716	11 October 1991		
723	12 December 1991		
750	10 April 1992		
774	26 August 1992		
789	25 November 1992		
796	14 December 1992		
831	27 May 1992		
839	11 June 1992		
889	15 December 1993		
902	11 March 1994		On achieving of an agreement on the confidence-building measures relating to Varosha and Nicosia International Airport, Cyprus
927	15 June 1994		On extension of the mandate of the UN Peace-keeping Force in Cyprus and implementation of confidence-building measures between the parties in Cyprus.
939	29 July 1994		

== Resolutions adopted by the General Assembly ==
1. 2077 (XX) 1965
2. 3212 (XXIX) 1974
3. 3395 (XXX) 1975
4. 31/12 1976
5. 32/15 1977
6. 33/15 1978
7. 34/30 1979
8. 37/253 1983

== On missing persons ==
1. 3450 (XXX) 1975
2. 32/128 1977
3. 33/172 1978
4. 36/164 1981
5. 37/181 1982

== On human rights ==
1. 4 (XXXI) 1975
2. 4 (XXXII) 1976
3. 17 (XXXIV) 1978
4. 1987/50 1987

== See also ==
- Turkish invasion of Cyprus
- Cyprus dispute
- Republic of Cyprus
- Cyprus refugees
- Annan Plan for Cyprus
