= United Nations Security Council Resolution 448 =

UN Security Council Resolution 448
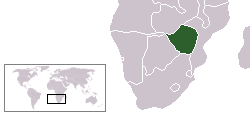
- Southern Rhodesia
- Date: 30 April 1979
- Meeting no.: 2,143
- Code: S/RES/448 (Document)
- Subject: Southern Rhodesia
- Voting summary: 12 voted for; None voted against; 3 abstained
- Result: Adopted

Security Council composition
- Permanent members: China; France; Soviet Union; United Kingdom; United States
- Non-permanent members: Bangladesh; Bolivia; Czechoslovakia; Gabon; Jamaica; Kuwait; Nigeria; Norway; Portugal; Zambia

United Nations Security Council resolution 448, adopted on 30 April 1979, after recalling resolutions 253 (1968), 403 (1977), 411 (1977), 423 (1978), 424 (1978), 437 (1978) and 445 (1979), the Council declared that the recent "sham" elections held in Southern Rhodesia by the "illegal racist regime" were illegal and the results thereof would be null and void.

The Council continued by stating that the elections, held in the defiance of the United Nations, were not a genuine exercise of the right of the people of Zimbabwe to self-determination and were designed to "perpetuate white racist minority rule".

Resolution 448 ended by urging Member States not to recognise the results of the elections, and to continue observing sanctions against Southern Rhodesia.

The resolution was adopted by 12 votes to none; France, the United Kingdom and United States abstained from voting.

== See also ==
- List of United Nations Security Council Resolutions 401 to 500 (1976–1982)
- Rhodesian Bush War
- Unilateral Declaration of Independence (Rhodesia)
- Zimbabwe Rhodesia general election, 1979
