= United Nations Security Council Resolution 445 =

UN Security Council Resolution 445
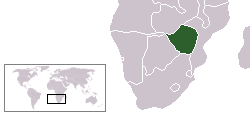
- Southern Rhodesia
- Date: 8 March 1979
- Meeting no.: 2,122
- Code: S/RES/445 (Document)
- Subject: Southern Rhodesia
- Voting summary: 12 voted for; None voted against; 3 abstained
- Result: Adopted

Security Council composition
- Permanent members: China; France; Soviet Union; United Kingdom; United States
- Non-permanent members: Bangladesh; Bolivia; Czechoslovakia; Gabon; Jamaica; Kuwait; Nigeria; Norway; Portugal; Zambia

United Nations Security Council resolution 445, adopted on 8 March 1979, after recalling resolutions 253 (1968), 403 (1977), 411 (1977), 423 (1978), 424 (1978) and 437 (1978), and hearing representations from various countries, the council expressed its concern about the military operations undertaken by the "illegal regime" against countries both bordering and non-contiguous with Southern Rhodesia. The council was also indignant at the execution and sentences against persons under repressive laws.

Resolution 445 continued to express concern at member states who were to send observers to the "so-called elections" in April 1979, the result of which the council would not recognise. The council also commended Angola, Mozambique, Zambia and other states for their support for the people of Zimbabwe, encouraging other Member States to provide support to them.

Finally, the council proposed to extend and widen the international sanctions against Southern Rhodesia, asking the committee established in Resolution 253 to consider further measures and report back to the council by 23 March 1979.

The resolution passed with 12 votes to none against, with 3 abstentions from France, the United Kingdom and United States.

== See also ==
- List of United Nations Security Council Resolutions 401 to 500 (1976–1982)
- Rhodesian Bush War
- Unilateral Declaration of Independence (Rhodesia)
