= United Nations Security Council Resolution 484 =

UN Security Council Resolution 484
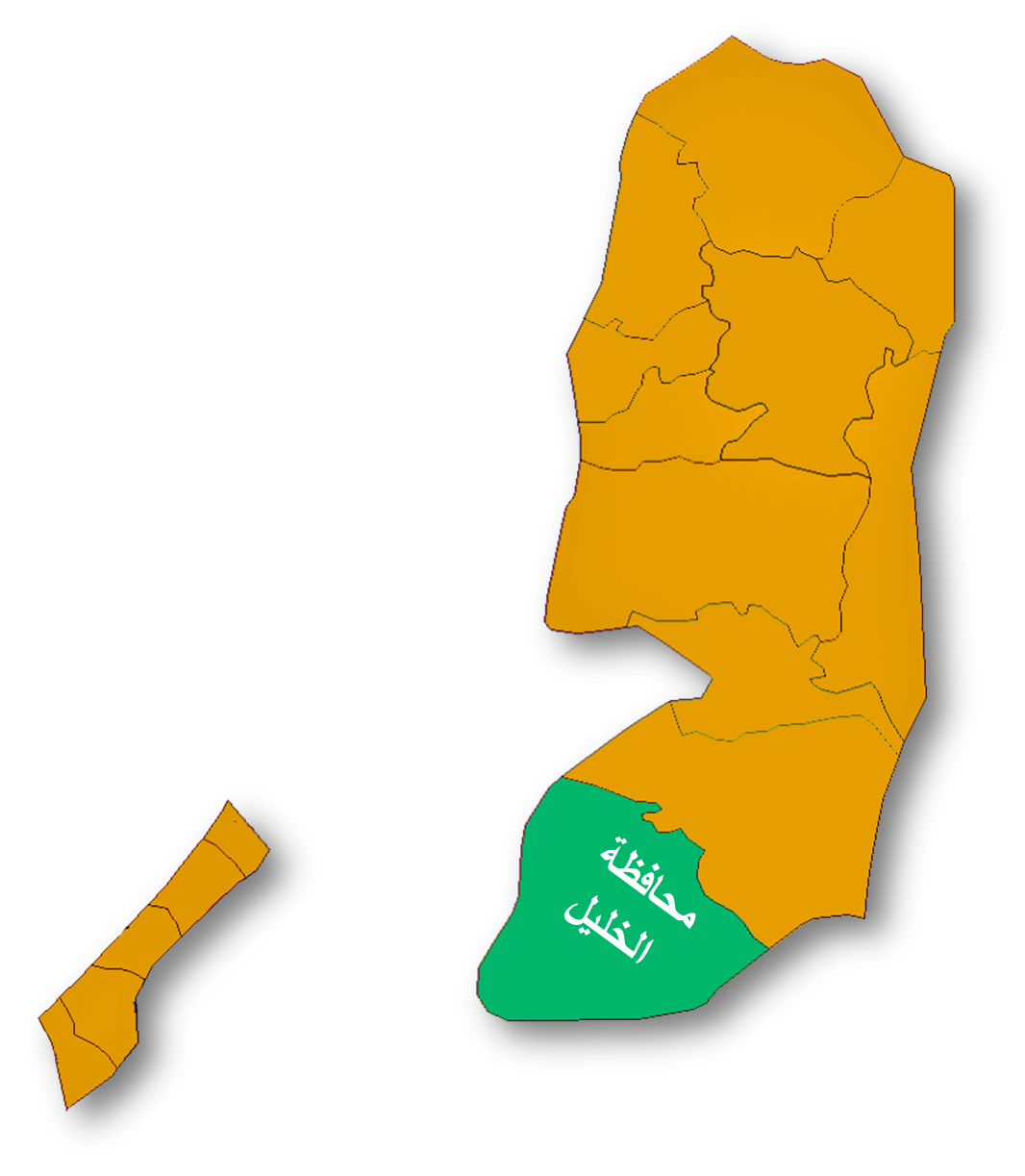
- Governorate of Hebron (green) in the West Bank
- Date: 19 December 1980
- Meeting no.: 2,260
- Code: S/RES/484 (Document)
- Subject: Territories occupied by Israel
- Voting summary: 15 voted for; None voted against; None abstained
- Result: Adopted

Security Council composition
- Permanent members: China; France; Soviet Union; United Kingdom; United States
- Non-permanent members: Bangladesh; East Germany; Jamaica; Mexico; Niger; Norway; Philippines; Portugal; Tunisia; Zambia

United Nations Security Council resolution 484, adopted unanimously on 19 December 1980, after recalling resolutions 468 (1980) and 469 (1980) on the topic, the council expressed its concern regarding the expulsion of the Mayors of Hebron and Halhoul, as well as the Sharia judge of Hebron by occupying Israeli forces.

The resolution called upon Israel to adhere to the Geneva Conventions and to facilitate the return of the individuals concerned to resume the functions they were elected or appointed to do. The council also requested the Secretary-General to continually monitor the implementation of the resolution.

== See also ==
- Israeli–Palestinian conflict
- List of United Nations Security Council Resolutions 401 to 500 (1976–1982)
