= United Nations Security Council Resolution 473 =

UN Security Council Resolution 473
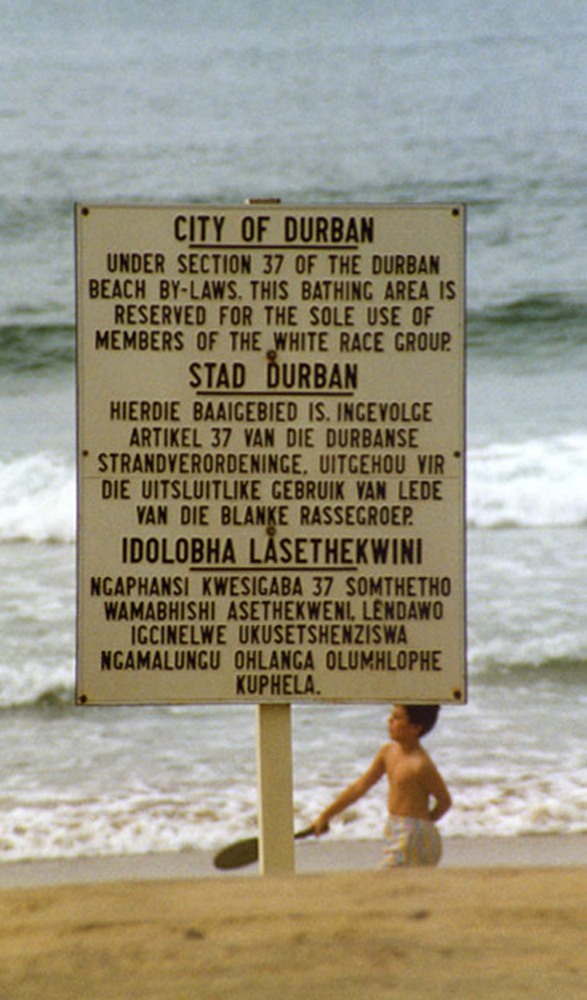
- Apartheid-era sign on a South African beach
- Date: 13 June 1980
- Meeting no.: 2,231
- Code: S/RES/473 (Document)
- Subject: South Africa
- Voting summary: 15 voted for; None voted against; None abstained
- Result: Adopted

Security Council composition
- Permanent members: China; France; Soviet Union; United Kingdom; United States
- Non-permanent members: Bangladesh; East Germany; Jamaica; Mexico; Niger; Norway; Philippines; Portugal; Tunisia; Zambia

United Nations Security Council resolution 473, adopted unanimously on 13 June 1980, after recalling resolutions 392 (1976), 417 (1977), 418 (1977), 454 (1979) and 466 (1980) and letters from the Committee for South Africa, the council expressed its concern and condemned South Africa for the killing of protesters, including schoolchildren, opposed to apartheid.

The resolution went on to call for the release of political prisoners, including Nelson Mandela, under a proposed amnesty. It also expressed sympathy with victims of the violence, calling for an end to apartheid legislation that affects the news media, trials, organisations and equal opportunities. The council also called on South Africa to cease military attacks on other countries, and encourages other Member States to reinforce the arms embargo on the country.

== See also ==
- List of United Nations Security Council Resolutions 401 to 500 (1976–1982)
- South Africa under apartheid
