= United Nations Security Council Resolution 460 =

UN Security Council Resolution 460
- Date: 21 December 1979
- Meeting no.: 2,181
- Code: S/RES/460 (Document)
- Subject: Southern Rhodesia
- Voting summary: 13 voted for; None voted against; 2 abstained
- Result: Adopted

Security Council composition
- Permanent members: China; France; Soviet Union; United Kingdom; United States
- Non-permanent members: Bangladesh; Bolivia; Czechoslovakia; Gabon; Jamaica; Kuwait; Nigeria; Norway; Portugal; Zambia

United Nations Security Council resolution 460, adopted on 21 December 1979, after taking note of the Lancaster House Agreement, the council decided to terminate measures taken against Southern Rhodesia in resolutions 232 (1966) and 253 (1968) and any subsequent resolutions. The resolution deplored the "loss of life, waste and suffering" over the past 14 years caused by the rebellion in southern Rhodesia.

The resolution went on to dissolve the committee established in Resolution 253, and commended member states, particularly the front-line states, for their implementation of the sanctions against southern Rhodesia. The council demanded urgent assistance from the international community to the Zimbabwean people, and reminded the parties to uphold the agreement.

Resolution 460 ended by calling upon the administering power, the United Kingdom, to ensure that no South African forces or other foreign mercenaries remain or enter the country. Finally, the council decided to keep the situation under review until Southern Rhodesia gained full independence (as Zimbabwe).

The resolution was adopted by 13 votes to none, while Communist Czechoslovakia and the Soviet Union abstained.

== See also ==
- List of United Nations Security Council Resolutions 401 to 500 (1976–1982)
- History of Zimbabwe
- Rhodesian Bush War
- Unilateral Declaration of Independence (Rhodesia)
