= United Nations Security Council Resolution 416 =

UN Security Council Resolution 416
- The Middle East
- Date: 21 October 1977
- Meeting no.: 2,035
- Code: S/RES/416 (Document)
- Subject: Egypt-Israel
- Voting summary: 13 voted for; None voted against; None abstained
- Result: Adopted

Security Council composition
- Permanent members: China; France; Soviet Union; United Kingdom; United States
- Non-permanent members: Benin; Canada; India; Libya; Mauritius; Pakistan; Panama; Romania; Venezuela; West Germany

United Nations Security Council Resolution 416, adopted on October 21, 1977, considered a report by the Secretary-General regarding the United Nations Disengagement Observer Force and noted the discussions the Secretary-General had with all the concerned parties to the Middle East situation. The council expressed its concern over the continuing tension in the area and decided to:

(a) To renew the mandate of the United Nations Disengagement Observer Force for another year, until October 24, 1978;
(b) To request the Secretary-General to keep the Security Council informed on further developments;
(c) To call upon all parties to immediately implement resolution 338 (1973).

The resolution was adopted by 13 votes to none; China and Libya did not participate in the vote.

== See also ==
- Arab–Israeli conflict
- Egypt–Israel relations
- List of United Nations Security Council Resolutions 401 to 500 (1976–1982)
