= United Nations Security Council Resolution 440 =

UN Security Council Resolution 440
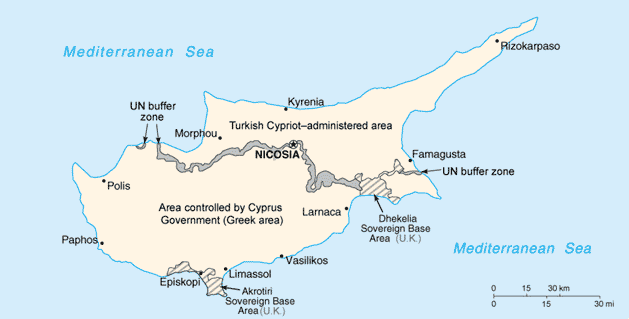
- Divided Cyprus
- Date: 27 November 1978
- Meeting no.: 2,100
- Code: S/RES/440 (Document)
- Subject: Cyprus
- Result: Adopted

Security Council composition
- Permanent members: China; France; Soviet Union; United Kingdom; United States
- Non-permanent members: Bolivia; Canada; Czechoslovakia; Gabon; India; Kuwait; Mauritius; Nigeria; Venezuela; West Germany

United Nations Security Council Resolution 440, adopted on 27 November 1978, after hearing from a representative of Cyprus, the Council expressed deep concern at lack of progress on the peace issue. The resolution reaffirmed resolutions 365 (1974), 367 (1975) and 410 (1977), calling on all parties to ensure they implement the resolutions and resume negotiations with the United Nations.

The resolution also called on the Secretary-General to monitor the situation and report back by 30 May 1979 or earlier, in time for the Security Council to review the situation again in June 1979.

No details of the voting were given, other than that it was adopted "by consensus".

== See also ==
- Cyprus dispute
- List of United Nations Security Council Resolutions 401 to 500 (1976–1982)
- Turkish invasion of Cyprus
