= United Nations Security Council Resolution 409 =

United Nations Security Council resolution

UN Security Council Resolution 409
- Date: 27 May 1977
- Meeting no.: 2,011
- Code: S/RES/409 (Document)
- Subject: Southern Rhodesia
- Result: Adopted

Security Council composition
- Permanent members: China; France; Soviet Union; United Kingdom; United States
- Non-permanent members: Benin; Canada; India; Libya; Mauritius; Pakistan; Panama; Romania; Venezuela; West Germany

United Nations Security Council Resolution 409, adopted on May 27, 1977, reaffirmed the council's previous resolutions and affirmed that the policies created by them would remain in place. The council, acting under Chapter VII, further decided that all member states should prohibit the use of funds in their territory from use by Rhodesia and/or Rhodesian citizens, save for pensions. The Resolution also decided that the committee established in Resolution 253 (1968) should examine possible uses of Article 41 of the Charter of the United Nations.

The resolution was adopted unanimously without a vote.

The goal of the resolution was to force the closure of the Rhodesian information offices in Australia, South Africa and the United States. The Carter Administration took steps to cut off funding from Rhodesia to the Rhodesian Information Office in Washington, D.C. in line with this resolution during August 1977, but it remained open until 1979 after receiving donations from American citizens. The Fraser government in Australia developed legislation during 1977 to close the Rhodesia Information Centre in Sydney, but abandoned this due to opposition from its own backbenchers. The Fraser government considered legislating to close the centre again in 1979 after being criticised by the United Nations for failing to implement Resolution 409.

== See also ==
- List of United Nations Security Council Resolutions 401 to 500 (1976–1982)
- Rhodesian Bush War
