= United Nations Security Council Resolution 485 =

UN Security Council Resolution 485
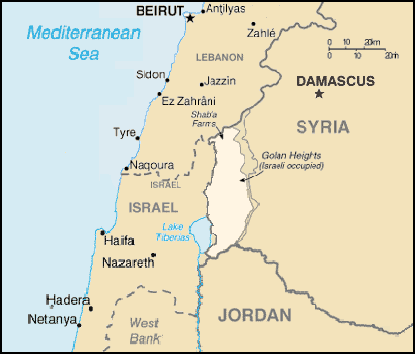
- Golan Heights
- Date: 22 May 1981
- Meeting no.: 2,278
- Code: S/RES/485 (Document)
- Subject: Israel–Syria
- Voting summary: 14 voted for; None voted against; None abstained
- Result: Adopted

Security Council composition
- Permanent members: China; France; Soviet Union; United Kingdom; United States
- Non-permanent members: East Germany; Ireland; Japan; Mexico; Niger; Panama; Philippines; Spain; Tunisia; Uganda

United Nations Security Council resolution 485, adopted on 22 May 1981, considered a report by the Secretary-General regarding the United Nations Disengagement Observer Force. The Council noted its efforts to establish a durable and just peace in the Middle East but also expressed its concern over the prevailing state of tension in the area.

The resolution decided to call upon the parties concerned to immediately implement Resolution 338 (1973), it renewed the mandate of the Observer Force for another six months until 30 November 1981 and requested that the Secretary-General submit a report on the situation at the end of that period.

The resolution was adopted with 14 votes to none; China did not participate in the voting.

== See also ==
- Arab–Israeli conflict
- Golan Heights
- Israel–Syria relations
- List of United Nations Security Council Resolutions 401 to 500 (1976–1982)
