= United Nations Security Council Resolution 407 =

UN Security Council Resolution 407
- Transkei (red) within South Africa, and Lesotho
- Date: 25 May 1977
- Meeting no.: 2,009
- Code: S/RES/407 (Document)
- Subject: Lesotho-South Africa
- Result: Adopted

Security Council composition
- Permanent members: China; France; Soviet Union; United Kingdom; United States
- Non-permanent members: Benin; Canada; India; Libya; Mauritius; Pakistan; Panama; Romania; Venezuela; West Germany

United Nations Security Council Resolution 402, adopted on May 25, 1977, after recalling Resolution 402 (1976), the Council noted with concern the continued harassment of the people of Lesotho by South Africa in violation of the resolution. It also recognised the burden that had been placed upon Lesotho with regard to its decision not to recognise the "independent" bantustan Transkei by South Africa.

The Council commended the Government of Lesotho for its decision not to recognise Transkei. It endorsed the report by the Mission to Lesotho and Secretary-General Kurt Waldheim's call for international assistance to Lesotho. The Resolution also called upon the Secretary-General to monitor the situation and report any developments.

The resolution was adopted without a vote.

== See also ==
- List of United Nations Security Council Resolutions 401 to 500 (1976–1982)
- South Africa under apartheid
