= United Nations Security Council Resolution 408 =

UN Security Council Resolution 408
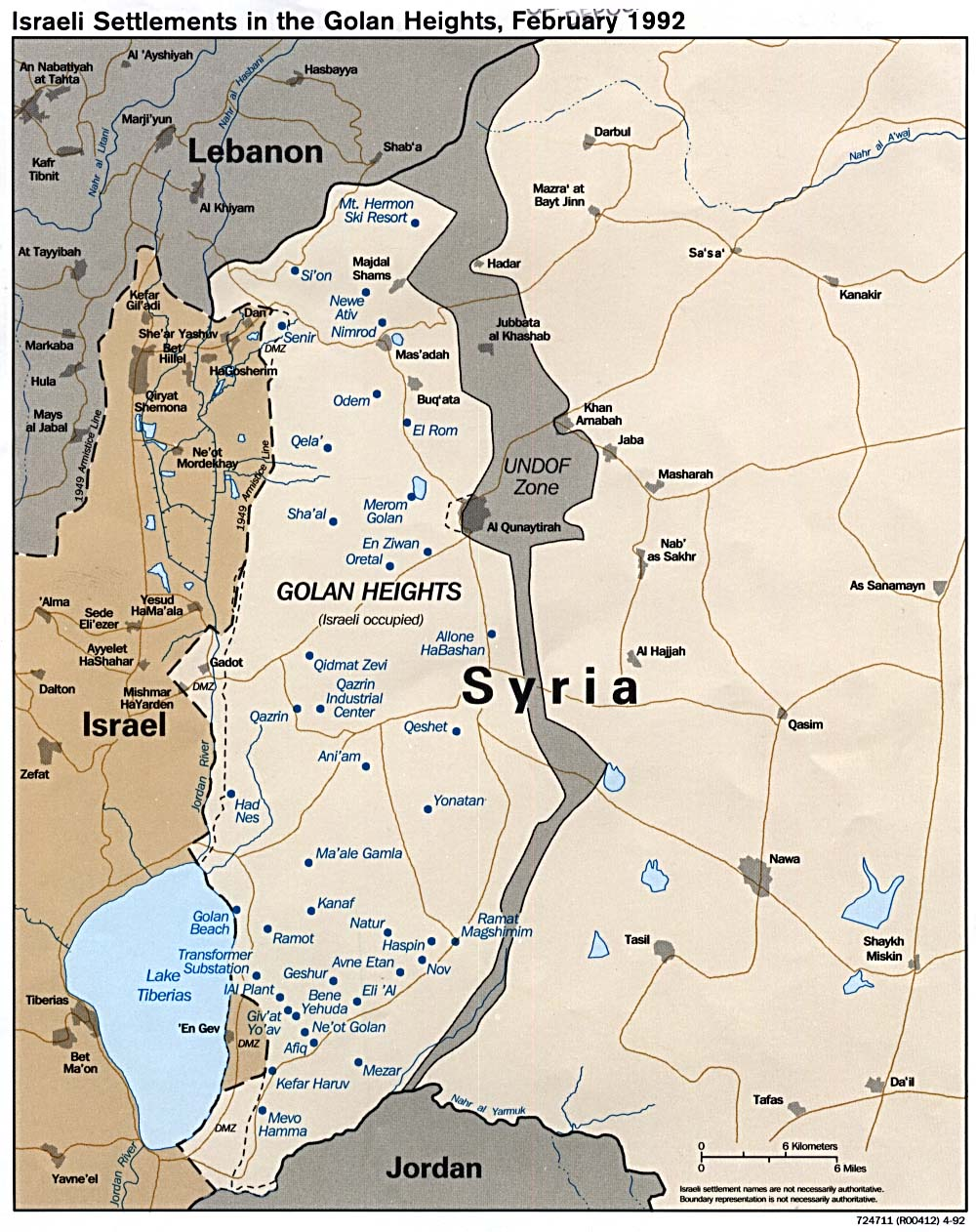
- UNDOF zone map
- Date: 26 May 1977
- Meeting no.: 2,010
- Code: S/RES/408 (Document)
- Subject: Israel-Syrian Arab Republic
- Voting summary: 12 voted for; None voted against; None abstained
- Result: Adopted

Security Council composition
- Permanent members: China; France; Soviet Union; United Kingdom; United States
- Non-permanent members: Benin; Canada; India; Libya; Mauritius; Pakistan; Panama; Romania; Venezuela; West Germany

United Nations Security Council Resolution 408, adopted on May 26, 1977, considered a report by the Secretary-General regarding the United Nations Disengagement Observer Force. The Council noted its efforts to establish a durable and just peace in the Middle East but also expressed its concern over the prevailing state of tension in the area.

The Resolution decided to call upon the parties concerned to immediately implement Resolution 338 (1973), it renewed the mandate of the Observer Force for another 6 months until November 30, 1977 and requested that the Secretary-General submit a report on the situation at the end of that period.

The resolution was adopted with 12 votes to none; Benin, China and Libya did not participate in the voting.

== See also ==
- Arab–Israeli conflict
- Golan Heights
- Israel–Syria relations
- List of United Nations Security Council Resolutions 401 to 500 (1976–1982)
