= United Nations Security Council Resolution 406 =

UN Security Council Resolution 406
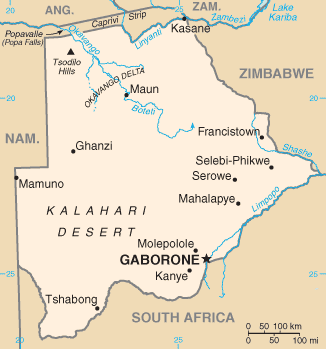
- Location of Botswana
- Date: 25 May 1977
- Meeting no.: 2,008
- Code: S/RES/406 (Document)
- Subject: Botswana-Southern Rhodesia
- Result: Adopted

Security Council composition
- Permanent members: China; France; Soviet Union; United Kingdom; United States
- Non-permanent members: Benin; Canada; India; Libya; Mauritius; Pakistan; Panama; Romania; Venezuela; West Germany

United Nations Security Council Resolution 406, adopted on May 25, 1977, after reaffirming resolutions 403 (1977), 232 (1966) and 258 (1965) and reading a report from the Mission in Botswana, the Council expressed its full support to the Government of Botswana against continued attacks and provocations by the "illegal racist regime" in Southern Rhodesia.

The Council fully endorsed the report presented by the Mission to Botswana and called for international assistance by all relevant agencies of the United Nations and other Member States in various projects in Botswana. Resolution 406 also asked for the Secretary-General Kurt Waldheim to continue to monitor the situation and report back any developments.

The resolution was adopted without a vote.

== See also ==
- List of United Nations Security Council Resolutions 401 to 500 (1976–1982)
