= United Nations Security Council Resolution 472 =

UN Security Council Resolution 472
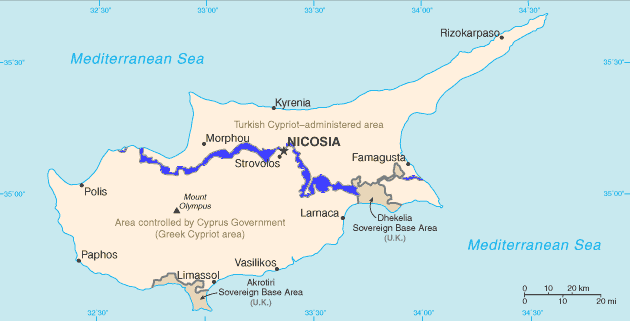
- UNFICYP buffer zone
- Date: 13 June 1980
- Meeting no.: 2,230
- Code: S/RES/472 (Document)
- Subject: Cyprus
- Voting summary: 14 voted for; None voted against; None abstained
- Result: Adopted

Security Council composition
- Permanent members: China; France; Soviet Union; United Kingdom; United States
- Non-permanent members: Bangladesh; East Germany; Jamaica; Mexico; Niger; Norway; Philippines; Portugal; Tunisia; Zambia

United Nations Security Council Resolution 472, adopted on 13 June 1980, noted a report of the secretary-general that, due to the existing circumstances, the presence of the United Nations Peacekeeping Force in Cyprus (UNFICYP) would continue to be essential for a peaceful settlement. The council expressed its concerns regarding actions which could heighten tensions, and asked the Secretary-General to report back again before 30 November 1980 to follow the implementation of the resolution.

The council reaffirmed its previous resolutions, including Resolution 365 (1974), expressed its concern over the situation, urged the involved parties to work together toward peace and once more extended the stationing of the Force in Cyprus, established in Resolution 186 (1964), until 15 December 1980.

The resolution was adopted by 14 votes to none; the People's Republic of China did not participate in the voting.

== See also ==
- Cyprus dispute
- List of United Nations Security Council Resolutions 401 to 500 (1976–1982)
- Turkish invasion of Cyprus
