= United Nations Security Council Resolution 424 =

UN Security Council Resolution 424
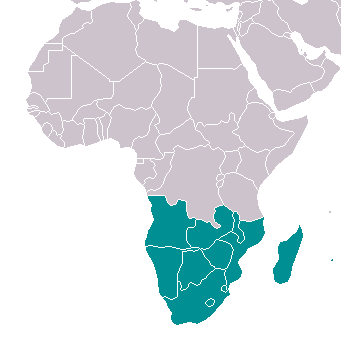
- Countries in southern Africa
- Date: 17 March 1978
- Meeting no.: 2,070
- Code: S/RES/424 (Document)
- Subject: Southern Rhodesia-Zambia
- Voting summary: 15 voted for; None voted against; None abstained
- Result: Adopted

Security Council composition
- Permanent members: China; France; Soviet Union; United Kingdom; United States
- Non-permanent members: Bolivia; Canada; Czechoslovakia; Gabon; India; Kuwait; Mauritius; Nigeria; Venezuela; West Germany

United Nations Security Council Resolution 424 was adopted unanimously on March 17, 1978; after hearing representations from Zambia, the Council expressed concern at unprovoked attacks against the country by the "illegal racist regime" in Southern Rhodesia, which resulted in deaths and destruction of property in Zambia. The Rhodesian Security Forces maintained that they had been attacking guerrilla bases in the country.

The Council recalled previous resolutions, including 423 (1978), 326 (1973), 403 (1977), 406 (1977) and 411 (1977) condemning Southern Rhodesia for its attacks in Angola, Botswana, Mozambique and Zambia which constituted a threat to international peace and security. It also reiterated its call for the liberation of the people in Zimbabwe and Namibia to secure peace in the region and condemned apartheid in South Africa. The Council added that it supports those States which support the liberation of these territories.

The resolution ends by adding that if any further acts by Southern Rhodesia are committed against neighbouring countries, the Council will determine appropriate action, and, if necessary, invoke Chapter VII.

== See also ==
- List of United Nations Security Council Resolutions 401 to 500 (1976–1982)
