= United Nations Security Council Resolution 438 =

UN Security Council Resolution 438
- The Middle East
- Date: 23 October 1978
- Meeting no.: 2,091
- Code: S/RES/438 (Document)
- Subject: Egypt-Israel
- Voting summary: 12 voted for; None voted against; 2 abstained
- Result: Adopted

Security Council composition
- Permanent members: China; France; Soviet Union; United Kingdom; United States
- Non-permanent members: Bolivia; Canada; Czechoslovakia; Gabon; India; Kuwait; Mauritius; Nigeria; Venezuela; West Germany

United Nations Security Council Resolution 438, adopted on October 23, 1978, after reaffirming previous resolutions, considered a report by the Secretary-General regarding the United Nations Emergency Force and noted the discussions the Secretary-General had with all the concerned parties to the Middle East situation.

The Council expressed its concern over the continuing tension in the area and decided to:

(a) To renew the mandate of the United Nations Disengagement Observer Force for another year, until July 24, 1979;
(b) To request the Secretary-General to keep the Security Council to publish a report on the progress made at the end of this period;
(c) To call upon all parties to immediately implement resolution 338 (1973).

The resolution was adopted by 12 votes to none; Czechoslovakia and the Soviet Union abstained from voting. China did not participate in the vote.

== See also ==
- Arab–Israeli conflict
- Egypt–Israel relations
- List of United Nations Security Council Resolutions 401 to 500 (1971–1976)
