= United Nations Security Council Resolution 499 =

UN Security Council Resolution 499
- International Court of Justice
- Date: 21 December 1981
- Meeting no.: 2,321
- Code: S/RES/499 (Document)
- Subject: International Court of Justice
- Voting summary: 15 voted for; None voted against; None abstained
- Result: Adopted

Security Council composition
- Permanent members: China; France; Soviet Union; United Kingdom; United States
- Non-permanent members: East Germany; Ireland; Japan; Mexico; Niger; Panama; Philippines; Spain; Tunisia; Uganda

United Nations Security Council Resolution 499, adopted unanimously on December 21, 1981, after noting the death of International Court of Justice (ICJ) judge Abdullah El-Erain, the Council decided that elections to the vacancy on the ICJ would take place at the Security Council and at the General Assembly's thirty-sixth session.

== See also ==
- List of United Nations Security Council Resolutions 401 to 500 (1976–1982)
