= United Nations Security Council Resolution 489 =

UN Security Council Resolution 489
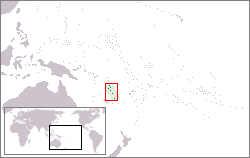
- Location of Vanuatu
- Date: 8 July 1981
- Meeting no.: 2,291
- Code: S/RES/489 (Document)
- Subject: Admission of new Members to the UN: Vanuatu
- Voting summary: 15 voted for; None voted against; None abstained
- Result: Adopted

Security Council composition
- Permanent members: China; France; Soviet Union; United Kingdom; United States
- Non-permanent members: East Germany; Ireland; Japan; Mexico; Niger; Panama; Philippines; Spain; Tunisia; Uganda

United Nations Security Council resolution 489, adopted unanimously on 8 July 1981, after examining the application of the Republic of Vanuatu for membership in the United Nations, the Council recommended to the General Assembly that Vanuatu be admitted.

== See also ==
- Member states of the United Nations
- List of United Nations Security Council Resolutions 401 to 500 (1976–1982)
