= United Nations Security Council Resolution 436 =

UN Security Council Resolution 436
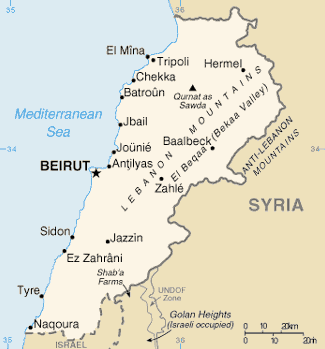
- Lebanon
- Date: 6 October 1978
- Meeting no.: 2,089
- Code: S/RES/436 (Document)
- Subject: Lebanon
- Voting summary: 15 voted for; None voted against; None abstained
- Result: Adopted

Security Council composition
- Permanent members: China; France; Soviet Union; United Kingdom; United States
- Non-permanent members: Bolivia; Canada; Czechoslovakia; Gabon; India; Kuwait; Mauritius; Nigeria; Venezuela; West Germany

United Nations Security Council Resolution 436, adopted unanimously on October 6, 1978, after noting the deteriorating situation in Lebanon and being deeply grieved at the loss of life in the country, the Council called upon all parties involved in the hostilities to end acts of violence and observe a ceasefire.

Due to a number of factors, a civil war broke out in the country, which was occupied by Syria during the time. The resolution called on all parties to allow the International Committee of the Red Cross access to the areas of conflict to provide humanitarian assistance and evacuate the wounded. The Council finally reaffirmed its support of the Secretary-General Kurt Waldheim in his efforts to keep the Council informed on developments in the situation.

== See also ==
- Lebanese Civil War
- List of United Nations Security Council Resolutions 401 to 500 (1976–1982)
- Syrian occupation of Lebanon
