= United Nations Security Council Resolution 433 =

UN Security Council Resolution 433
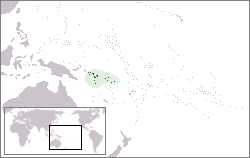
- Location of the Solomon Islands
- Date: 17 August 1978
- Meeting no.: 2,084
- Code: S/RES/433 (Document)
- Subject: Admission of new Members to the UN: Solomon Islands
- Voting summary: 15 voted for; None voted against; None abstained
- Result: Adopted

Security Council composition
- Permanent members: China; France; Soviet Union; United Kingdom; United States
- Non-permanent members: Bolivia; Canada; Czechoslovakia; Gabon; India; Kuwait; Mauritius; Nigeria; Venezuela; West Germany

United Nations Security Council Resolution 433, adopted unanimously on August 17, 1978, after examining the application of the Solomon Islands for membership in the United Nations, the Council recommended to the General Assembly that the Solomon Islands be admitted.

== See also ==
- List of United Nations member states
- List of United Nations Security Council Resolutions 401 to 500 (1976–1982)
