= United Nations Security Council Resolution 413 =

UN Security Council Resolution 413
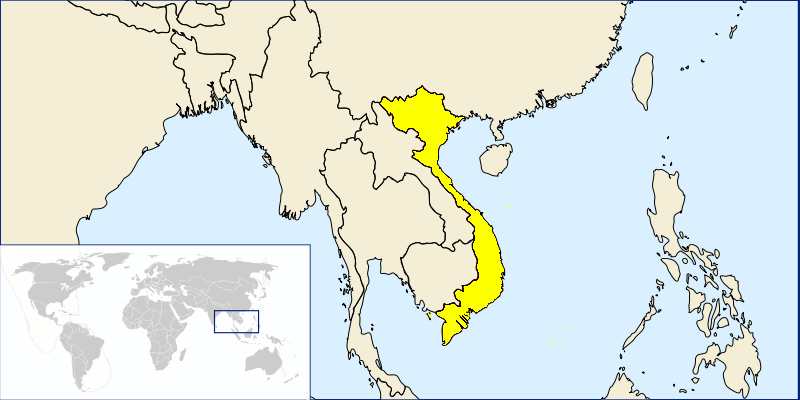
- Location of Vietnam
- Date: 20 July 1977
- Meeting no.: 2,025
- Code: S/RES/413 (Document)
- Subject: Admission of new Members to the UN: Vietnam
- Result: Adopted

Security Council composition
- Permanent members: China; France; Soviet Union; United Kingdom; United States
- Non-permanent members: Benin; Canada; India; Libya; Mauritius; Pakistan; Panama; Romania; Venezuela; West Germany

United Nations Security Council Resolution 413, adopted unanimously on July 20, 1977, after examining the application of the Socialist Republic of Vietnam for membership in the United Nations, the Council recommended to the General Assembly that Vietnam be admitted.

== See also ==
- List of United Nations member states
- List of United Nations Security Council Resolutions 401 to 500 (1976–1982)
