= United Nations Security Council Resolution 464 =

UN Security Council Resolution 464
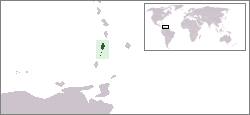
- Location of Saint Vincent and the Grenadines
- Date: 19 February 1980
- Meeting no.: 2,198
- Code: S/RES/464 (Document)
- Subject: Admission of new Members to the UN: Saint Vincent and the Grenadines
- Voting summary: 15 voted for; None voted against; None abstained
- Result: Adopted

Security Council composition
- Permanent members: China; France; Soviet Union; United Kingdom; United States
- Non-permanent members: Bangladesh; East Germany; Jamaica; Mexico; Niger; Norway; Philippines; Portugal; Tunisia; Zambia

United Nations Security Council resolution 464, adopted unanimously on 19 February 1980, after examining the application of Saint Vincent and the Grenadines for membership in the United Nations, the Council recommended to the General Assembly that Saint Vincent and the Grenadines be admitted.

== See also ==
- Member states of the United Nations
- List of United Nations Security Council Resolutions 401 to 500 (1976–1982)
