= United Nations Security Council Resolution 466 =

UN Security Council Resolution 466
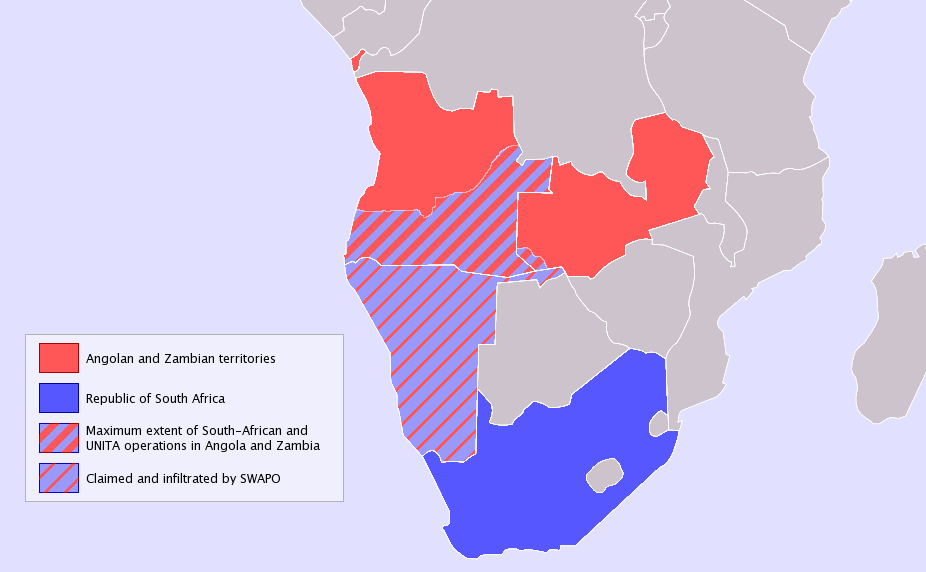
- South African border operations
- Date: 11 April 1980
- Meeting no.: 2,211
- Code: S/RES/466 (Document)
- Subject: South Africa–Zambia
- Voting summary: 15 voted for; None voted against; None abstained
- Result: Adopted

Security Council composition
- Permanent members: China; France; Soviet Union; United Kingdom; United States
- Non-permanent members: Bangladesh; East Germany; Jamaica; Mexico; Niger; Norway; Philippines; Portugal; Tunisia; Zambia

United Nations Security Council resolution 466, adopted unanimously on 11 April 1980, after hearing representations from Zambia and recalling 455 (1979), the council condemned the continued and unprovoked attacks on Zambia by South Africa.

The council continued to demand the withdrawal of South African forces from Zambian territory and warns that the council will take further action, including under Chapter VII, if this is not met. It also commended Zambia for its restraint during the attacks.

== See also ==
- List of United Nations Security Council Resolutions 401 to 500 (1976–1982)
- South African Border War
- South Africa under apartheid
