= United Nations Security Council Resolution 471 =

UN Security Council Resolution 471
- Middle East
- Date: 5 June 1980
- Meeting no.: 2,226
- Code: S/RES/471 (Document)
- Subject: Territories occupied by Israel
- Voting summary: 14 voted for; None voted against; 1 abstained
- Result: Adopted

Security Council composition
- Permanent members: China; France; Soviet Union; United Kingdom; United States
- Non-permanent members: Bangladesh; East Germany; Jamaica; Mexico; Niger; Norway; Philippines; Portugal; Tunisia; Zambia

United Nations Security Council Resolution 471, adopted on 5 June 1980 under Chapter VI of the United Nations Charter was on the issue of the Israeli occupation and settlement activity in the Palestinian territories of East Jerusalem, the West Bank, Gaza Strip and the Golan Heights.

It criticized the Israeli occupation of these territories. In addition, it expressed concern that Israel had failed to protect the civilians in the occupied territories and asked Israel to make compensation for damages suffered by civilians due to this lack of protection. Finally, it called upon Israel to comply with all relevant UN Security Council Resolutions and provisions of the Fourth Geneva Convention.

Resolution 471 was adopted by 14 votes to none, with 1 abstention from the United States.

== See also ==
- Israeli–Palestinian conflict
- List of United Nations Security Council Resolutions 401 to 500 (1976–1982)
