= United Nations Security Council Resolution 453 =

UN Security Council Resolution 453
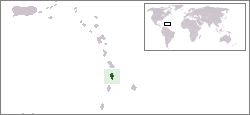
- Location of Saint Lucia
- Date: 12 September 1979
- Meeting no.: 2,167
- Code: S/RES/453 (Document)
- Subject: Admission of new Members to the UN: Saint Lucia
- Voting summary: 15 voted for; None voted against; None abstained
- Result: Adopted

Security Council composition
- Permanent members: China; France; Soviet Union; United Kingdom; United States
- Non-permanent members: Bangladesh; Bolivia; Czechoslovakia; Gabon; Jamaica; Kuwait; Nigeria; Norway; Portugal; Zambia

United Nations Security Council Resolution 453, adopted unanimously on 12 September 1979, after examining the application of Saint Lucia for membership in the United Nations, the Council recommended to the General Assembly that Saint Lucia be admitted.

== See also ==
- Member states of the United Nations
- List of United Nations Security Council Resolutions 401 to 500 (1976–1982)
