= United Nations Security Council Resolution 455 =

UN Security Council Resolution 455
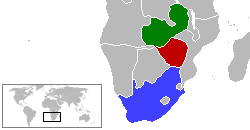
- Zambia (green), Southern Rhodesia (red), South Africa (blue)
- Date: 23 November 1979
- Meeting no.: 2,171
- Code: S/RES/455 (Document)
- Subject: Complaint by Zambia
- Result: Adopted

Security Council composition
- Permanent members: China; France; Soviet Union; United Kingdom; United States
- Non-permanent members: Bangladesh; Bolivia; Czechoslovakia; Gabon; Jamaica; Kuwait; Nigeria; Norway; Portugal; Zambia

United Nations Security Council resolution 455, adopted on 23 November 1979, after taking note of representations from Zambia and recalling Resolution 424 (1978), the Council expressed concern and condemned the "illegal racist regime" in Southern Rhodesia for its "sustained pattern of violations aimed at destroying the economic infrastructure" of Zambia and causing a number of deaths.

The resolution continued by condemning collusion by South Africa with Southern Rhodesia in the attacks against Zambia and other front-line states. It asked the responsible authorities to pay compensation to Zambia, and for the international community to assist in the rebuilding of destroyed infrastructure. The council commended Zambia and the other front-line states, such as Angola, Botswana and Mozambique for their support of the Zimbabwean people.

Finally, the council called upon the United Kingdom as the administrating power to take effective measures to help end offensive operations by the Rhodesian Security Forces, and established an ad hoc committee to report back to the council on the implementation of the present resolution by 15 December 1979.

No details of the vote were given, other than that it was "adopted by consensus".

== See also ==
- List of United Nations Security Council Resolutions 401 to 500 (1976–1982)
- Rhodesian Bush War
- Unilateral Declaration of Independence (Rhodesia)
