= United Nations Security Council Resolution 491 =

UN Security Council Resolution 491
- Location of Belize
- Date: 23 September 1981
- Meeting no.: 2,302
- Code: S/RES/491 (Document)
- Subject: Admission of new Members to the UN: Belize
- Voting summary: 15 voted for; None voted against; None abstained
- Result: Adopted

Security Council composition
- Permanent members: China; France; Soviet Union; United Kingdom; United States
- Non-permanent members: East Germany; Ireland; Japan; Mexico; Niger; Panama; Philippines; Spain; Tunisia; Uganda

United Nations Security Council resolution 491, adopted unanimously on 23 September 1981, after examining the application of Belize for membership in the United Nations, the Council recommended to the General Assembly that Belize be admitted.

== See also ==
- Member states of the United Nations
- List of United Nations Security Council Resolutions 401 to 500 (1976–1982)
