= United Nations Security Council Resolution 442 =

UN Security Council Resolution 442
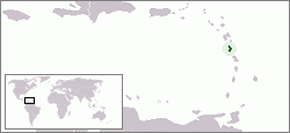
- Location of Dominica
- Date: 6 December 1978
- Meeting no.: 2,105
- Code: S/RES/442 (Document)
- Subject: Admission of new Members to the UN: Dominica
- Voting summary: 15 voted for; None voted against; None abstained
- Result: Adopted

Security Council composition
- Permanent members: China; France; Soviet Union; United Kingdom; United States
- Non-permanent members: Bolivia; Canada; Czechoslovakia; Gabon; India; Kuwait; Mauritius; Nigeria; Venezuela; West Germany

United Nations Security Council Resolution 442, adopted unanimously on December 6, 1978, after examining the application of the Commonwealth of Dominica for membership in the United Nations, the Council recommended to the General Assembly that Dominica be admitted.

== See also ==
- List of United Nations member states
- List of United Nations Security Council Resolutions 401 to 500 (1976–1982)
