= United Nations Security Council Resolution 477 =

UN Security Council Resolution 477
- Location of Zimbabwe
- Date: 30 July 1980
- Meeting no.: 2,244
- Code: S/RES/477 (Document)
- Subject: Admission of new Members to the UN: Zimbabwe
- Voting summary: 15 voted for; None voted against; None abstained
- Result: Adopted (1980-08-25)

Security Council composition
- Permanent members: China; France; Soviet Union; United Kingdom; United States
- Non-permanent members: Bangladesh; East Germany; Jamaica; Mexico; Niger; Norway; Philippines; Portugal; Tunisia; Zambia

United Nations Security Council Resolution 477, adopted unanimously on July 30, 1980, after examining the application of Zimbabwe for membership in the United Nations, the Council recommended to the General Assembly that Zimbabwe be admitted. The Republic of Zimbabwe was officially admitted as the 153rd member of the UN on 25 August 1980 by the General Assembly acting on the recommendation by the Security Council. Minister Robert Mugabe was on hand to accept membership on behalf of the Zimbabwean government.

== See also ==
- List of United Nations member states
- List of United Nations Security Council Resolutions 401 to 500 (1976–1982)
