= United Nations Security Council Resolution 469 =

UN Security Council Resolution 469
- Israel
- Date: 20 May 1980
- Meeting no.: 2,223
- Code: S/RES/469 (Document)
- Subject: Territories occupied by Israel
- Voting summary: 14 voted for; None voted against; 1 abstained
- Result: Adopted

Security Council composition
- Permanent members: China; France; Soviet Union; United Kingdom; United States
- Non-permanent members: Bangladesh; East Germany; Jamaica; Mexico; Niger; Norway; Philippines; Portugal; Tunisia; Zambia

United Nations Security Council resolution 469, adopted on 20 May 1980, after considering a report by the Secretary-General and noting relevant parts of the Geneva Convention, the Council deplored the Government of Israel's failure to implement Resolution 468 (1980).

The Council went on to call on Israel to rescind the expulsion of the Mayors of Hebron and Halhoul and the Sharia judge of Hebron, and requests the Secretary-General to continue his efforts.

The resolution was adopted with 14 votes to none, and one abstention from the United States.

== See also ==
- Israeli–Palestinian conflict
- List of United Nations Security Council Resolutions 401 to 500 (1976–1982)
