= United Nations Security Council Resolution 492 =

UN Security Council Resolution 492
- Location of Antigua and Barbuda
- Date: 10 November 1981
- Meeting no.: 2,309
- Code: S/RES/492 (Document)
- Subject: Admission of new Members to the UN: Antigua and Barbuda
- Voting summary: 15 voted for; None voted against; None abstained
- Result: Adopted

Security Council composition
- Permanent members: China; France; Soviet Union; United Kingdom; United States
- Non-permanent members: East Germany; Ireland; Japan; Mexico; Niger; Panama; Philippines; Spain; Tunisia; Uganda

United Nations Security Council resolution 492, adopted unanimously on 10 November 1981, after examining the application of Antigua and Barbuda for membership in the United Nations, the Council recommended to the General Assembly that Antigua and Barbuda be admitted.

== See also ==
- Member states of the United Nations
- List of United Nations Security Council Resolutions 401 to 500 (1976–1982)
