= United Nations Security Council Resolution 414 =

UN Security Council Resolution 414
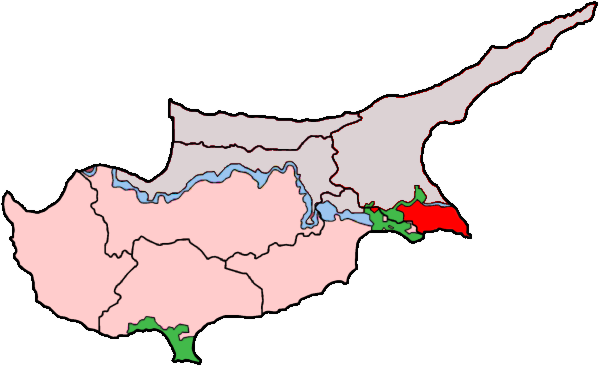
- Divided Cyprus
- Date: 15 September 1977
- Meeting no.: 2,032
- Code: S/RES/414 (Document)
- Subject: Cyprus
- Result: Adopted

Security Council composition
- Permanent members: China; France; Soviet Union; United Kingdom; United States
- Non-permanent members: Benin; Canada; India; Libya; Mauritius; Pakistan; Panama; Romania; Venezuela; West Germany

United Nations Security Council Resolution 414, adopted on 15 September 1977, after hearing from the Permanent Representative of the Republic of Cyprus, the Council expressed concern at recent developments in the country, particularly in the Famagusta area. It noted the urgency of progress on a peace settlement, reaffirming resolutions 365 (1974), 367 (1975) and General Assembly Resolution 2312 (1974).

The Council asked the Secretary-General to continue to monitor the situation.

The resolution was adopted without vote.

== See also ==
- Cyprus dispute
- List of United Nations Security Council Resolutions 401 to 500 (1976–1982)
- Turkish Invasion of Cyprus
