= List of United Nations Security Council Resolutions 401 to 500 =

This is a list of United Nations Security Council Resolutions 401 to 500 adopted between 14 December 1976 and 28 January 1982.

Resolution	Date	Vote	Concerns
401	14 December 1976	13–0–0 (Benin, China did not participate in voting)	Extends the mandate of the United Nations Peacekeeping Force in Cyprus
402	22 December 1976	Adopted "by consensus"	South Africa-Lesotho border closure; Transkei
403	14 January 1977	13–0–2 (abstentions: United Kingdom, United States)	Attacks on Botswana by Southern Rhodesia
404	8 February 1977	Adopted "by consensus"	Foreign mercenary attack in Benin
405	14 April 1977	Adopted "by consensus"	Special Mission report on Benin
406	25 May 1977	Adopted without vote	Report on attacks by Southern Rhodesia on Botswana
407	25 May 1977	Adopted without vote	Continued harassment of Lesotho by South Africa
408	26 May 1977	12–0–0 (Benin, China, Libya did not participate)	Extends the mandate of the United Nations Disengagement Observer Force
409	27 May 1977	Adopted without vote	Sanctions on Southern Rhodesia
410	15 June 1977	14–0–0 (China did not participate in voting)	Extending peacekeeping operations in Cyprus
411	30 June 1977	Adopted 15–0–0	Attacks on Mozambique by Southern Rhodesia
412	7 July 1977	Adopted 15–0–0	Admission of Djibouti to the United Nations
413	20 July 1977	Adopted "by consensus"	Admission of Vietnam to the United Nations
414	15 September 1977	Adopted without vote	Developing situation in Cyprus
415	29 September 1977	13–0–1 (abstention: USSR; China did not participate)	Discussions for the future of Southern Rhodesia
416	21 October 1977	13–0–0 (China, Libya did not participate in voting)	Extends mandate of the United Nations Disengagement Observer Force
417	31 October 1977	Adopted 15–0–0	Condemns continuing repression in South Africa
418	4 November 1977	Adopted 15–0–0	Imposes an arms embargo on South Africa
419	24 November 1977	Adopted without vote	Asking for international help on the mercenaries who attacked Benin
420	30 November 1977	12–0–0 (Benin, China, Libya did not participate)	Extending mandate of the United Nations Disengagement Observer Force
421	9 December 1977	Adopted 15–0–0	Establishes committee to monitor implementation of Resolution 418 on South Africa
422	15 December 1977	14–0–0 (China did not participate in voting)	Extends peacekeeping operations in Cyprus
423	14 March 1978	10–0–5 (abstentions: Canada, France, West Germany, UK, US)	Calls for an end to the "illegal racist regime" in Southern Rhodesia
424	17 March 1978	Adopted 15–0–0	Attacks on Zambia and other countries by Southern Rhodesia; Liberation movements in Namibia, Zimbabwe; South African apartheid
425	19 March 1978	12–0–2 (abstentions: Czechoslovakia, USSR; China did not participate)	Establishes the United Nations Interim Force in Lebanon (UNIFIL)
426	19 March 1978	12–0–2 (abstentions: Czechoslovakia, USSR; China did not participate)	Establishes the United Nations Interim Force in Lebanon (UNIFIL)
427	3 May 1978	12–0–2 (abstentions: Czechoslovakia, USSR; China did not participate)	Increases size of UNIFIL; condemns attacks on UN forces in Israel-Lebanon
428	6 May 1978	Adopted 15–0–0	Attack on Angola by South Africa; suppression of people in Namibia
429	31 May 1978	14–0–0 (China did not participate in voting)	Extends mandate of the United Nations Disengagement Observer Force
430	16 June 1978	14–0–0 (China did not participate in voting)	Extends mandate of the United Nations Peacekeeping Force in Cyprus
431	27 July 1978	13–0–2 (abstentions: Czechoslovakia, USSR)	Proposals for situation in Namibia; appointment of Special Representative
432	27 July 1978	Adopted 15–0–0	Calls for integration of Walvis Bay back into Namibia
433	17 August 1978	Adopted 15–0–0	Admission of the Solomon Islands to the United Nations
434	18 September 1978	12–0–2 (abstentions: Czechoslovakia, USSR; China did not participate)	Extends mandate of the United Nations Interim Force in Lebanon
435	29 September 1978	12–0–2 (abstentions: Czechoslovakia, USSR; China did not participate)	Establishment of United Nations Transition Assistance Group (UNTAG) in Namibia
436	6 October 1978	Adopted 15–0–0	The Lebanese Civil War
437	10 October 1978	11–0–4 (abstentions: Canada, West Germany, UK, US)	Decision of the United States to allow Southern Rhodesian regime members to enter country
438	23 October 1978	12–0–2 (abstentions: Czechoslovakia, USSR; China did not participate)	Extends mandate of the United Nations Emergency Force
439	13 November 1978	10–0–5 (abstentions: Canada, France, West Germany, UK, US)	Condemns South Africa's decision to hold unilateral elections in South West Africa
440	27 November 1978	Adopted "by consensus"	Peace progress in Cyprus
441	30 November 1978	14–0–0 (China did not participate in voting)	Extends mandate of the United Nations Disengagement Observer Force
442	6 December 1978	Adopted 15–0–0	Admission of the Commonwealth of Dominica to the United Nations
443	14 December 1978	14–0–0 (China did not participate in the voting)	Extends mandate of the United Nations Peacekeeping Force in Cyprus
444	19 January 1979	12–0–2 (abstentions: Czechoslovakia, USSR; China did not participate)	Extends mandate of the United Nations Interim Force in Lebanon
445	8 March 1979	12–0–3 (abstentions: France, UK, US)	Attacks on other countries by Southern Rhodesia; 1979 election
446	22 March 1979	12–0–3 (abstentions: Norway, UK, US)	Determines Israeli Settlements have no legal validity and are an obstacle to a comprehensive peace.
447	28 March 1979	12–0–3 (abstentions: France, UK, US)	South African attack on Angola
448	30 April 1979	12–0–3 (abstentions: France, UK, US)	Zimbabwe Rhodesia general election, 1979
449	30 May 1979	14–0–0 (China did not participate in voting)	Extends mandate of the United Nations Disengagement Observer Force
450	14 June 1979	12–0–2 (abstentions: Czechoslovakia, USSR; China did not participate)	Condemns Israeli attacks; extends mandate of the United Nations Interim Force in Lebanon
451	15 June 1979	14–0–0 (China did not participate in the voting)	Extends mandate of the United Nations Peacekeeping Force in Cyprus
452	20 July 1979	14–0–1 (abstention: United States)	Israeli settlements
453	12 September 1979	Adopted 15–0–0	Admission of Saint Lucia to the United Nations
454	2 November 1979	12–0–3 (abstentions: France, UK, US)	Attacks on Angola by South Africa
455	23 November 1979	Adopted "by consensus"	Attacks on Zambia by Southern Rhodesia; South African collusion
456	30 November 1979	14–0–0 (China did not participate in voting)	Extends mandate of the United Nations Disengagement Observer Force
457	4 December 1979	Adopted 15–0–0	Iran and the United States during the Iran hostage crisis
458	14 December 1979	14–0–0 (China did not participate in the voting)	Extends mandate of the United Nations Peacekeeping Force in Cyprus
459	19 December 1979	12–0–2 (abstentions: Czechoslovakia, USSR; China did not participate)	Extends mandate of the United Nations Interim Force in Lebanon; notes concerns
460	21 December 1979	13–0–2 (abstentions: Czechoslovakia, USSR)	Ends sanctions against Southern Rhodesia; notes Lancaster House Agreement
461	31 December 1979	11–0–4 (abstentions: Bangladesh, Czechoslovakia, Kuwait, USSR)	Condemns Iran for further holding of American embassy personnel
462	9 January 1980	12–2–1 (against: East Germany, USSR; abstention: Zambia)	Calls emergency General Assembly meeting to discuss the Soviet invasion of Afghanistan
463	2 February 1980	14–0–0 (United Kingdom did not participate in voting)	Implementation of the Lancaster House Agreement
464	19 February 1980	Adopted 15–0–0	Admission of Saint Vincent and the Grenadines
465	1 March 1980	Adopted 15–0–0	Israeli settlements
466	11 April 1980	Adopted 15–0–0	South African attack on Zambia
467	24 April 1980	12–0–3 (abstentions: East Germany, USSR, US)	Attacks on the United Nations Interim Force in Lebanon
468	8 May 1980	14–0–1 (abstention: United States)	Expulsion of Palestinian officials by Israel
469	20 May 1980	14–0–1 (abstention: United States)	Calls on Israel to implement Resolution 468
470	30 May 1980	14–0–0 (China did not participate in voting)	Extends mandate of the United Nations Disengagement Observer Force
471	5 June 1980	14–0–1 (abstention: United States)	Israeli settlements
472	13 June 1980	14–0–0 (China did not participate in the voting)	Extends mandate of the United Nations Peacekeeping Force in Cyprus
473	13 June 1980	Adopted 15–0–0	Condemns apartheid in South Africa
474	17 June 1980	12–0–2 (abstentions: East Germany, USSR; China did not participate)	Extends mandate of the United Nations Interim Force in Lebanon
475	27 June 1980	12–0–3 (abstentions: France, UK, US)	South African attack on Angola
476	30 June 1980	14–0–1 (abstention: United States)	Territories occupied by Israel
477	30 July 1980	Adopted 15–0–0	Admission of Zimbabwe to the United Nations
478	20 August 1980	14–0–1 (abstention: United States)	Jerusalem Law
479	28 September 1980	Adopted 15–0–0	Calls for cessation of military activities during the Iran–Iraq War
480	12 November 1980	Adopted 15–0–0	Filling vacancies in the International Court of Justice
481	26 November 1980	14–0–0 (China did not participate in voting)	Extends mandate of the United Nations Disengagement Observer Force
482	11 December 1980	14–0–0 (China did not participate in the voting)	Extends mandate of the United Nations Peacekeeping Force in Cyprus
483	17 December 1980	12–0–2 (abstentions: East Germany, USSR; China did not participate)	Extends mandate of the United Nations Interim Force in Lebanon
484	19 December 1980	Adopted 15–0–0	Expulsion of Palestinian officials by Israel
485	22 May 1981	14–0–0 (China did not participate in voting)	Extends mandate of the United Nations Disengagement Observer Force
486	4 June 1981	14–0–0 (China did not participate in the voting)	Extends mandate of the United Nations Peacekeeping Force in Cyprus
487	19 June 1981	Adopted 15–0–0	Israeli attack on an Iraqi nuclear site certified by the International Atomic Energy Agency
488	19 June 1981	12–0–2 (abstentions: East Germany, USSR; China did not participate)	Extends mandate of the United Nations Interim Force in Lebanon
489	8 July 1981	Adopted 15–0–0	Admission of the Republic of Vanuatu to the United Nations
490	21 July 1981	Adopted 15–0–0	Airstrikes on Lebanon by Israel; precursor to the 1982 Lebanon War
491	23 September 1981	Adopted 15–0–0	Admission of Belize to the United Nations
492	10 November 1981	Adopted 15–0–0	Admission of Antigua and Barbuda to the United Nations
493	23 November 1981	14–0-0 (China did not participate in voting)	Extends mandate of the United Nations Disengagement Observer Force
494	11 December 1981	Adopted 15–0–0	Appointment of Javier Pérez de Cuéllar as Secretary General
495	14 December 1981	Adopted 15–0–0	Extends mandate of the United Nations Peacekeeping Force in Cyprus
496	15 December 1981	Adopted 15–0–0	Failed mercenary coup attempt in the Seychelles
497	17 December 1981	Adopted 15–0–0	Israel's Golan Heights Law
498	18 December 1981	13–0–2 (abstentions: East Germany, USSR)	Extends mandate of the United Nations Interim Force in Lebanon
499	21 December 1981	Adopted 15–0–0	Vacancies at the International Court of Justice
500	28 January 1982	13–0–2 (abstentions: UK, US)	Calls an emergency General Assembly meeting regarding Israel and the Golan Heights

== See also ==
- Lists of United Nations Security Council resolutions
- List of United Nations Security Council Resolutions 301 to 400
- List of United Nations Security Council Resolutions 501 to 600
