= United Nations Security Council Resolution 412 =

UN Security Council Resolution 412
- Location of Djibouti
- Date: 7 July 1977
- Meeting no.: 2,021
- Code: S/RES/412 (Document)
- Subject: Admission of new Members to the UN: Djibouti
- Voting summary: 15 voted for; None voted against; None abstained
- Result: Adopted

Security Council composition
- Permanent members: China; France; Soviet Union; United Kingdom; United States
- Non-permanent members: Benin; Canada; India; Libya; Mauritius; Pakistan; Panama; Romania; Venezuela; West Germany

United Nations Security Council Resolution 412, adopted unanimously on July 7, 1977, after examining the application of the Republic of Djibouti for membership in the United Nations, the Council recommended to the General Assembly that Djibouti be admitted.

== See also ==
- List of United Nations member states
- List of United Nations Security Council Resolutions 401 to 500 (1976–1982)
