= United Nations Security Council Resolution 417 =

UN Security Council Resolution 417
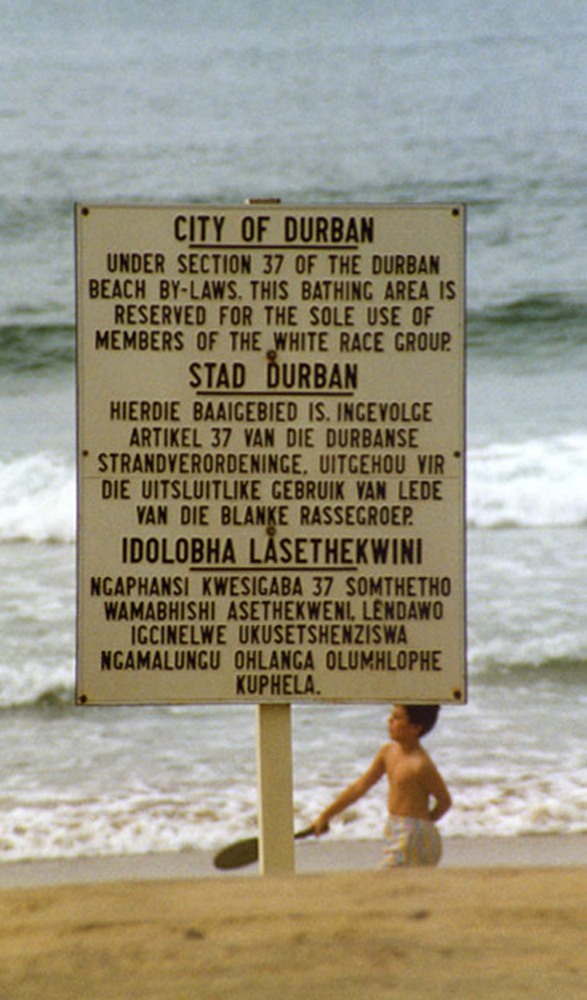
- Apartheid-era sign on a South African beach
- Date: 31 October 1977
- Meeting no.: 2,045
- Code: S/RES/417 (Document)
- Subject: South Africa
- Voting summary: 15 voted for; None voted against; None abstained
- Result: Adopted

Security Council composition
- Permanent members: China; France; Soviet Union; United Kingdom; United States
- Non-permanent members: Benin; Canada; India; Libya; Mauritius; Pakistan; Panama; Romania; Venezuela; West Germany

In United Nations Security Council Resolution 417, adopted on October 31, 1977, after reaffirming Resolution 392 (1976), the Council condemned the continuing repression against black people and other opponents of apartheid, as well as the South African media and the mounting deaths of detainees. The Council foresaw that the continuation of such activities would lead to serious racial conflict with international repercussions.

The resolution demanded therefore, that the Government of South Africa:

(a) end the violence against the opponents of apartheid;
(b) release all persons held under arbitrary security laws;
(c) cease its violent response to demonstrations against apartheid;
(d) remove bans on news media opposed to apartheid;
(e) abolish the "Bantu education system" and the bantustans.

The resolution went on to ask Member States to support the resolution and provide assistance to those fleeing South Africa. It also requested the Secretary-General Kurt Waldheim, along with the Special Committee against Apartheid, to monitor the situation and issue a report on the implementation of Resolution 417 by February 17, 1978.

The meeting, called for by Tunisia in light of the repressive measures adopted by South Africa, adopted the resolution unanimously. Three previous draft resolutions were rejected due to objections by some permanent members of the council.

== Contemporary leadership ==
- Jimmy Carter
- Valery Giscard d'Estaing
- Margaret Thatcher
- Hua Guofeng
- Leonid Brezhnev
- Morarji Desai
- Pierre Eliott Trudeau
- Nicolae Ceaușescu
- Helmut Schmidt
- Muammar Gaddafi
- Muhammad Zia-ul-Haq

== See also ==
- List of United Nations Security Council Resolutions 401 to 500 (1976–1982)
- South Africa under apartheid
