= United Nations Security Council Resolution 415 =

UN Security Council Resolution 415
- Date: 29 September 1977
- Meeting no.: 2,034
- Code: S/RES/415 (Document)
- Subject: Southern Rhodesia
- Voting summary: 13 voted for; None voted against; 1 abstained
- Result: Adopted

Security Council composition
- Permanent members: China; France; Soviet Union; United Kingdom; United States
- Non-permanent members: Benin; Canada; India; Libya; Mauritius; Pakistan; Panama; Romania; Venezuela; West Germany

United Nations Security Council Resolution 415, adopted on September 29, 1977, noted a letter and an invitation from the United Kingdom to the President of the Security Council to appoint a representative to "enter into discussions with the British Resident Commissioner designate and with all the parties concerning the military and associated arrangements that are considered necessary to effect the transition to majority rule". The Council requested the Secretary-General appoint such representatives, further requested the Secretary-General to transmit a report on the results of the discussions back as soon as possible and finally called on all parties to co-operate with the representative.

The resolution was adopted with 13 votes, with one abstention from the Soviet Union. The People's Republic of China did not participate in voting.

== See also ==
- List of United Nations Security Council Resolutions 401 to 500 (1976–1982)
- Rhodesian Bush War
