= United Nations Security Council Resolution 437 =

United Nations Security Council resolution

UN Security Council Resolution 437
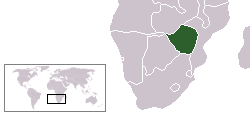
- Southern Rhodesia
- Date: 10 October 1978
- Meeting no.: 2,090
- Code: S/RES/437 (Document)
- Subject: Southern Rhodesia
- Voting summary: 11 voted for; None voted against; 4 abstained
- Result: Adopted

Security Council composition
- Permanent members: China; France; Soviet Union; United Kingdom; United States
- Non-permanent members: Bolivia; Canada; Czechoslovakia; Gabon; India; Kuwait; Mauritius; Nigeria; Venezuela; West Germany

United Nations Security Council Resolution 437, adopted on October 10, 1978, recalled Resolution 253 (1968), which prohibited Member States from allowing individuals connected to the regime in Southern Rhodesia to enter their territory. The Council noted with regret that the United States had allowed Ian Smith and other members of the "illegal regime" to enter the country, considering this action a violation of Resolution 253.

The Council called on the United States to observe the provisions of the Security Council and expressed hope that the U.S. would continue to exert its influence in Southern Rhodesia to facilitate the achievement of majority rule.

The resolution was adopted by a vote of 11 in favour, none against, with four abstentions: Canada, West Germany, the United Kingdom and United States.

== See also ==
- List of United Nations Security Council Resolutions 401 to 500 (1976–1982)
- Rhodesian Bush War
- Unilateral Declaration of Independence (Rhodesia)
