= United Nations Security Council Resolution 402 =

UN Security Council Resolution 402
- Transkei (red) within South Africa, and Lesotho
- Date: 22 December 1976
- Meeting no.: 1,982
- Code: S/RES/402 (Document)
- Subject: Lesotho-South Africa
- Result: Adopted

Security Council composition
- Permanent members: China; France; Soviet Union; United Kingdom; United States
- Non-permanent members: Benin; Guyana; Italy; Japan; Libya; Pakistan; Panama; Romania; Sweden; Tanzania

United Nations Security Council Resolution 402, adopted on December 22, 1976, after hearing from the Minister of Foreign Affairs for Lesotho, the Council expressed concern at South Africa's decision to close the border with Lesotho in many areas in an attempt to pressure the country to recognise the "independence" of the bantustan Transkei. After recalling previous resolutions, the Council praised Lesotho for not recognising Transkei and stated it will organise economic assistance to the country from the organisation itself and other countries to help it overcome the blockade by South Africa.

The resolution went on to ask the Secretary-General to monitor the situation in the region and to later report to the Security Council.

No details of the voting were given, other than that it was "adopted by consensus".

== See also ==
- List of United Nations Security Council Resolutions 401 to 500 (1976–1982)
- South Africa under apartheid
