= United Nations Security Council Resolution 468 =

UN Security Council Resolution 468
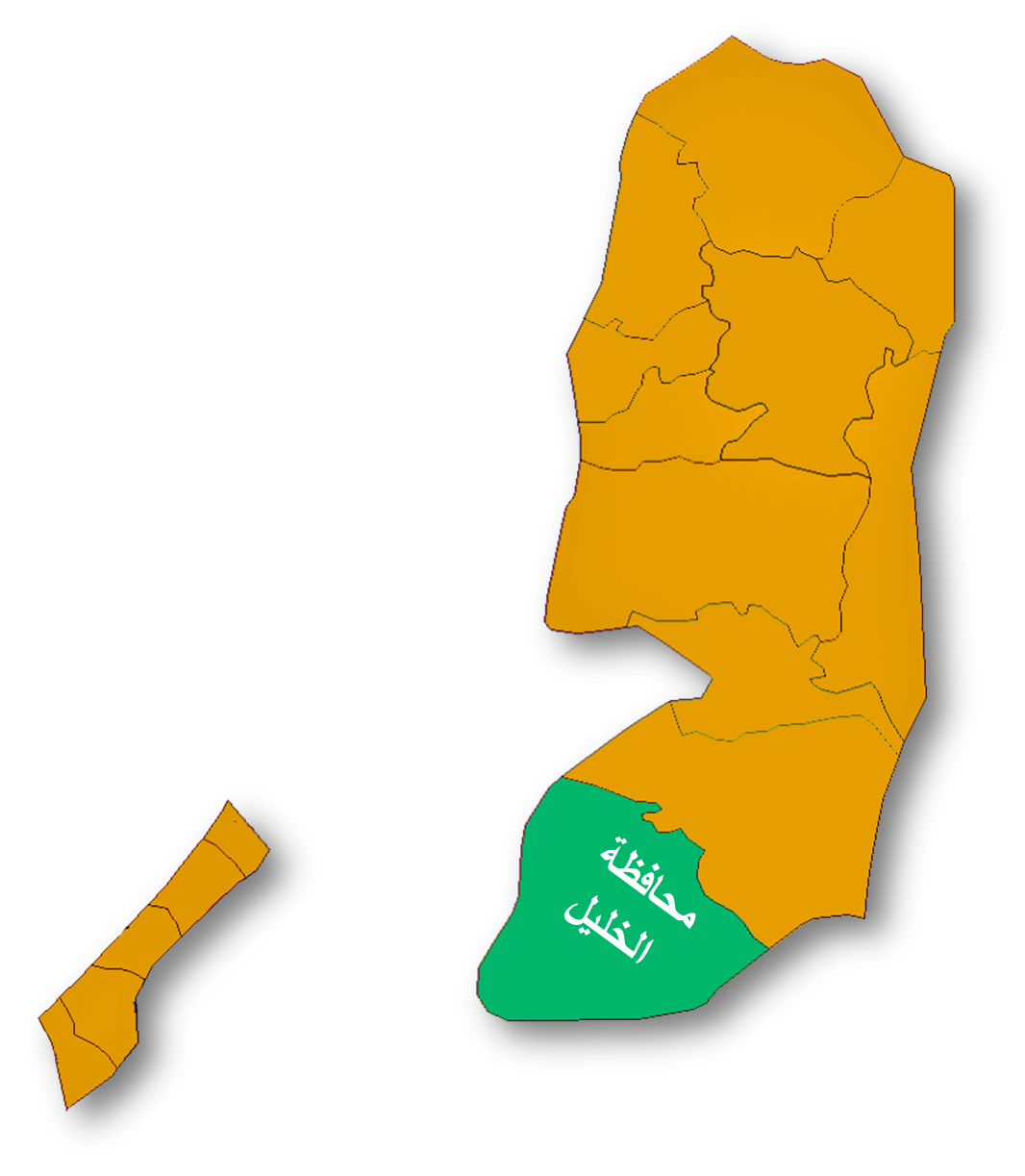
- Governorate of Hebron (green) in the West Bank
- Date: 8 May 1980
- Meeting no.: 2,221
- Code: S/RES/468 (Document)
- Subject: Territories occupied by Israel
- Voting summary: 14 voted for; None voted against; 1 abstained
- Result: Adopted

Security Council composition
- Permanent members: China; France; Soviet Union; United Kingdom; United States
- Non-permanent members: Bangladesh; East Germany; Jamaica; Mexico; Niger; Norway; Philippines; Portugal; Tunisia; Zambia

The United Nations Security Council resolution 468 was adopted on 8 May 1980. After recalling the Geneva Conventions, the council expressed its concern regarding the expulsion of the mayors of Hebron and Halhoul, as well as the Sharia judge of Hebron by occupying Israeli forces.

The resolution called upon Israel to rescind the "illegal measures" and to facilitate the return of the individuals concerned to resume the functions they were elected or appointed to do. The council also requested the secretary-general to continually monitor the implementation of the resolution.

Resolution 468 was adopted with 14 votes to none, and one abstention from the United States.

== See also ==
- Israeli–Palestinian conflict
- List of United Nations Security Council Resolutions 401 to 500 (1976–1982)
