= United Nations Security Council Resolution 411 =

UN Security Council Resolution 411
- Date: 30 June 1977
- Meeting no.: 2,019
- Code: S/RES/411 (Document)
- Subject: Mozambique-Southern Rhodesia
- Voting summary: 15 voted for; None voted against; None abstained
- Result: Adopted

Security Council composition
- Permanent members: China; France; Soviet Union; United Kingdom; United States
- Non-permanent members: Benin; Canada; India; Libya; Mauritius; Pakistan; Panama; Romania; Venezuela; West Germany

United Nations Security Council Resolution 411, adopted unanimously on June 30, 1977, noted statements made by officials of the People's Republic of Mozambique and also expressed its concern regarding the situation created by the provocative, aggressive acts committed by the illegal minority regime in Rhodesia. The Council reaffirmed their earlier work regarding Rhodesia, including their resolutions imposing sanctions on that country and noted their appreciation with Mozambique's co-operation with that plan. The Resolution then condemns Rhodesia's aggressive acts, including military incursions, against Mozambique and noted the urgent and special economic need of Mozambique who arose from its implementation of resolution 253.

The Council appealed states to provide immediate assistance to Mozambique, requested that various agencies of the UN, including the UNDP, the Food Program, the World Bank and the IMF assist Mozambique. Finally, the Resolution requests the Secretary-General organize the effort to overcome the economic difficulties that had befallen Mozambique due to its applications of economic sanctions against Rhodesia.

== See also ==
- List of United Nations Security Council Resolutions 401 to 500 (1976–1982)
