= United Nations Security Council Resolution 423 =

UN Security Council Resolution 423
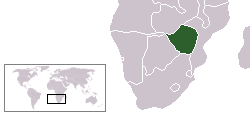
- Location of Rhodesia
- Date: 14 March 1978
- Meeting no.: 2,067
- Code: S/RES/423 (Document)
- Subject: Southern Rhodesia
- Voting summary: 10 voted for; None voted against; 5 abstained
- Result: Adopted

Security Council composition
- Permanent members: China; France; Soviet Union; United Kingdom; United States
- Non-permanent members: Bolivia; Canada; Czechoslovakia; Gabon; India; Kuwait; Mauritius; Nigeria; Venezuela; West Germany

In United Nations Security Council Resolution 423, adopted on March 14, 1978, after recalling its resolutions on Southern Rhodesia, particularly 415 (1977), the Council condemned attempts by the "illegal racist regime" in Southern Rhodesia to retain power and prevent the independence of Zimbabwe. It also criticised the country's executions of political prisoners and actions against neighbouring countries.

== History ==
The Council declared that any settlement by the regime in Southern Rhodesia would be unlawful and asked other member states not to offer recognition to it. It also called on the "illegal regime" to transfer power and hold free and fair elections, requiring the government of the United Kingdom to take all measures necessary to bring about an end to the regime.

The resolution then called on all parties concerned to enter into negotiations to achieve genuine decolonisation of the territory. Finally, Resolution 423 called on the Secretary-General to monitor the situation and report back no later than April 15, 1978.

The resolution was adopted by 10 votes to none; Canada, France, West Germany, the United Kingdom, and United States abstained.

== See also ==
- List of United Nations Security Council Resolutions 401 to 500 (1976–1982)
- Rhodesian Bush War
