= United Nations Security Council Resolution 232 =

UN Security Council Resolution 232
- Map of Southern Rhodesia
- Date: December 16 1966
- Meeting no.: 1340
- Subject: Question concerning the situation in Southern Rhodesia
- Voting summary: 11 voted for; None voted against; 4 abstained
- Result: Adopted

Security Council composition
- Permanent members: China; France; Soviet Union; United Kingdom; United States
- Non-permanent members: Argentina; Bulgaria; Japan; Jordan; Mali; Netherlands; New Zealand; Nigeria; Uganda; Uruguay

United Nations Security Council Resolution 232 was adopted by the United Nations Security Council on December 16, 1966.

The Council declared that all member states should prevent the importation of asbestos, iron ore, chrome, pig iron, sugar, tobacco, copper, or animal products originating from Southern Rhodesia. Member states were also to prevent any activities designed to promote the export of these commodities, or the importation of arms, ammunition, military aircraft, military vehicles and equipments, and materials for the manufacture and maintenance of arms and ammunition. A total embargo of oil and oil products was also declared, though exception was made for contracts granted before this resolution.

The Council also reaffirmed the inalienable rights of the people of Southern Rhodesia to freedom and independence and recognized the legitimacy of their struggle.

The resolution was adopted with 11 votes to none; the People's Republic of Bulgaria, France, Mali and the Soviet Union abstained.

== See also ==
- List of United Nations Security Council Resolutions 201 to 300 (1965–1971)
- Unilateral Declaration of Independence (Rhodesia)
- United Nations Security Council Resolution 221
