= United Nations Security Council Resolution 403 =

UN Security Council Resolution 403
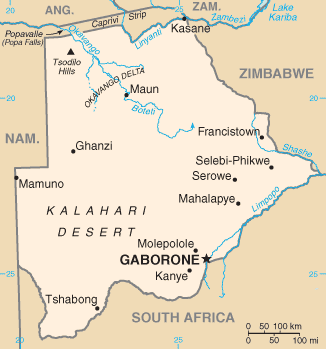
- Location of Botswana
- Date: 14 January 1977
- Meeting no.: 1,985
- Code: S/RES/403 (Document)
- Subject: Botswana-Southern Rhodesia
- Voting summary: 13 voted for; None voted against; 2 abstained
- Result: Adopted

Security Council composition
- Permanent members: China; France; Soviet Union; United Kingdom; United States
- Non-permanent members: Benin; Canada; India; Libya; Mauritius; Pakistan; Panama; Romania; Venezuela; West Germany

United Nations Security Council Resolution 403, adopted on January 14, 1977, after hearing representations from the Minister of External Affairs of Botswana, condemned attacks by the "illegal minority regime" in Southern Rhodesia. The resolution recalled previous resolutions on the topic, including the right to self-determination of the people of Southern Rhodesia.

The Council reaffirmed the legal responsibility of the Government of the United Kingdom over Southern Rhodesia, and demanded the latter cease all hostile acts. The resolution, noting the economic hardship caused by the attacks, requested all relevant agencies of the United Nations and other member states to assist in various projects in Botswana.

The resolution was adopted with 13 votes; the United Kingdom and United States abstained from voting.

== See also ==
- List of United Nations Security Council Resolutions 401 to 500 (1976–1982)
