= United Nations Security Council Resolution 253 =

UN Security Council Resolution 253
- Date: May 29 1968
- Meeting no.: 1428
- Code: S/RES/253 (Document)
- Subject: Question concerning the Situation in Southern Rhodesia
- Voting summary: 15 voted for; None voted against; None abstained
- Result: Adopted

Security Council composition
- Permanent members: China; France; Soviet Union; United Kingdom; United States
- Non-permanent members: Algeria; Brazil; Canada; Denmark; Ethiopia; Hungary; India; Pakistan; Paraguay; Senegal

United Nations Security Council Resolution 253, adopted unanimously on May 29, 1968, after reaffirming previous resolutions, the Council noted with concern that the measures taken so far have failed to bring the rebellion in Southern Rhodesia to an end and condemned the recent "inhuman executions carried out by the illegal regime in Southern Rhodesia which have flagrantly affronted the conscience of mankind". After further condemning the regime and calling upon the United Kingdom to end the rebellion in Southern Rhodesia the Council decided that all member states would:

(a) - prevent importing products originating in Southern Rhodesia after the date of this resolution regardless of the legal nature of those products
(b) - suspend any activities of their nationals in the territories of UN member states designed to promote the export of commodities of products from Southern Rhodesia
(c) - prohibit the shipment of vessels or aircraft registered in Southern Rhodesia or by Southern Rhodesians from coming into their territory.
(d) - prevent the sale or supply by their nationals or from their territories of any commodities or products (save those strictly intended for medical purposes, education, publications, news and in special humanitarian circumstances - food)
(e) - prohibit the shipment of goods by vessels, aircraft or land transport across their territory intended for Southern Rhodesia

The Council also decided that member states should not make available to the regime any commercial, industrial or public utility undertaking, including tourist enterprises, in Southern Rhodesia any funds for investment or any other financial of economic resources and shall prevent their nationals or anyone in their territories from making available any such funds or resources and from remitting any other funds to persons or bodies within Southern Rhodesia, save for pensions, medial, humanitarian, education, news and in some circumstances food-stuffs. The Council further decided that member states would prevent the entry into their territory of anyone traveling on a Southern Rhodesian passport as well as persons whom they have reason to believe to be ordinarily a resident of Southern Rhodesia and whom they have reason to believe to have furthered or encouraged, or to be likely to further or encourage, the unlawful actions of the illegal regime.

The Council then decided that all member states would prevent airline companies constituted in their territories as well as aircraft of their registration or under charter to their nationals from operation to or from Southern Rhodesia or linking up with any airline company constituted or aircraft registered in Southern Rhodesia. UN specialized agencies were called upon to take all possible measures to prevent activities promoting, assisting or encouraging emigration to Southern Rhodesia. The Council also requested member states and UN agencies to assist Zambia as a matter of priority, as the carrying out of this resolution would likely create economic problems in that country. Finally, the Council decided to establish a Committee to report on the implementation of this resolution.

== See also ==
- List of United Nations Security Council Resolutions 201 to 300 (1965–1971)
