= United Nations Security Council Resolution 338 =

1973 UN Security Council resolution calling for a ceasefire in the Yom Kippur War

UN Security Council Resolution 338
- Territorial changes during the Yom Kippur War
- Date: 22 October 1973
- Meeting no.: 1,747
- Code: S/RES/338 (Document)
- Subject: Ceasefire in the Middle East
- Voting summary: 14 voted for; None voted against; 1 abstained
- Result: Approved

Security Council composition
- Permanent members: China; France; Soviet Union; United Kingdom; United States
- Non-permanent members: Australia; Austria; Guinea; India; Indonesia; Kenya; Panama; Peru; Sudan; Yugoslavia

United Nations Security Council Resolution 338 was a three-line resolution adopted by the UN Security Council on 22 October 1973, which called for a ceasefire in the Yom Kippur War in accordance with a joint proposal by the United States and the Soviet Union. It was passed at the 1747th Security Council meeting by 14 votes to none, with China abstaining.

The resolution stipulated that the ceasefire should take effect within 12 hours of the adoption of the resolution; that Security Council Resolution 242 be implemented "in all its parts"; and for negotiations to start between Israel and the Arab states. Fighting continued despite the passing of Resolution 338, and the Security Council passed Resolution 339 soon after. Resolution 340 was passed on 25 October, ending the war.

== The resolution ==
Resolution 338 read:

The Security Council

1. Calls upon all parties to the present fighting to cease all firing and terminate all military activity immediately, no later than 12 hours after the moment of the adoption of this decision, in the positions they now occupy;
2. Calls upon the parties concerned, to start immediately after the cease-fire the implementation of Security Council resolution 242 (1967) in all of its parts;
3. Decides that, immediately and concurrently with the cease-fire, negotiations shall start between the parties concerned under appropriate auspices aimed at establishing a just and durable peace in the Middle East.

The "appropriate auspices" was interpreted to mean American or Soviet rather than UN auspices. This third clause helped to establish the framework for the Geneva Conference of 1973.

== Adoption ==
The resolution was brought before the Security Council on 22 October. It was passed the same day with the US, UK, France, Soviet Union, Australia, Austria, Guinea, India, Indonesia, Peru, Kenya, Yugoslavia, Sudan and Panama all voting to approve the resolution, and China abstaining.

== Failure ==
Henry Kissinger, the US Secretary of State, hinted to Golda Meir, the Israeli Prime Minister that he would not object to an Israeli offensive during the night before the ceasefire came into effect.

The ceasefire was breached soon after the resolution was adopted by the Security Council, with both sides blaming the other. Scud missiles were fired at Israeli forces, and Israeli forces continued pushing south.

== Binding or non-binding issue ==
The alleged importance of Resolution 338 in the Arab–Israeli conflict stems from the word "decides" in the third clause, which is held to make Resolution 242 binding. However, the decision in the third clause does not relate to Resolution 242, but rather to the need to begin negotiations on a just and durable peace in the Middle East that led to the Geneva Conference of 1973, which Syria did not attend.

The argument continues; Article 25 of the United Nations Charter says that UN members "agree to accept and carry out the decisions of the Security Council". It is generally accepted that Security Council resolutions adopted according to Chapter VII of the UN Charter in the exercise of its primary responsibility for the maintenance of international peace in accordance with the UN Charter are binding upon the member states.

Scholars applying this doctrine on the resolution assert that the use of the word "decide" makes it a "decision" of the council, thus invoking the binding nature of article 25. The legal force added to Resolution 242 by this resolution is the reason for the otherwise puzzling fact that SC 242 and the otherwise seemingly superfluous and superannuated Resolution 338 are always referred to together in legal documents relating to the conflict.

The more obvious need for the use of Resolution 338 is that it requires all parties to cease fire and states when that should occur, without which Resolution 242 can't be accomplished.

Some scholars have advanced the position that the resolution was passed as a non-binding Chapter VI recommendation. Other commentators assert that it probably was passed as a binding Chapter VII resolution. The resolution contains reference to neither Chapter VI nor Chapter VII.

== Arab–Israeli peace diplomacy and treaties ==
- Faisal–Weizmann Agreement (1919)
- Paris Peace Conference, 1919
- 1949 Armistice Agreements
- Camp David Accords (1978)
- Egypt–Israel peace treaty (1979)
- Madrid Conference of 1991
- Oslo Accords (1993)
- Israel–Jordan peace treaty (1994)
- Camp David 2000 Summit
- Israeli–Palestinian peace process
- Projects working for peace among Israelis and Arabs
- List of Middle East peace proposals
- International law and the Arab–Israeli conflict

== See also ==
- Arab–Israeli conflict
- List of United Nations Security Council Resolutions 301 to 400 (1971–1976)
- United Nations Security Council Resolution 242
