= United Nations Security Council Resolution 186 =

UN Security Council Resolution 186
- Cyprus
- Date: 4 March 1964
- Meeting no.: 1102
- Code: S/5575 (Document)
- Subject: The Cyprus Question
- Voting summary: 11 voted for; None voted against; None abstained
- Result: Adopted

Security Council composition
- Permanent members: China; France; Soviet Union; United Kingdom; United States
- Non-permanent members: Bolivia; Brazil; Czechoslovakia; Ivory Coast; Morocco; Norway

United Nations Security Council Resolution 186, adopted unanimously on 4 March 1964 during the Cyprus crisis of 1963–64, calling on all member states to conform to their obligations under the Charter, asked the Government of Cyprus to take all additional measures necessary to stop violence and bloodshed and called on communities in Cyprus and their leaders to act with restraint. The resolution then recommended the creation of a peace-keeping force in the interest of preserving international peace and to prevent a recurrence of fighting and that, in agreement with the Governments of Greece, Turkey and the United Kingdom, a mediator would be appointed to try to promote a peaceful solution to the problem confronting Cyprus.

== See also ==
- Cypriot intercommunal violence
- List of United Nations Security Council Resolutions 101 to 200 (1953–1965)
- United Nations Peacekeeping Force in Cyprus
