= United Nations Security Council Resolution 365 =

UN Security Council Resolution 365
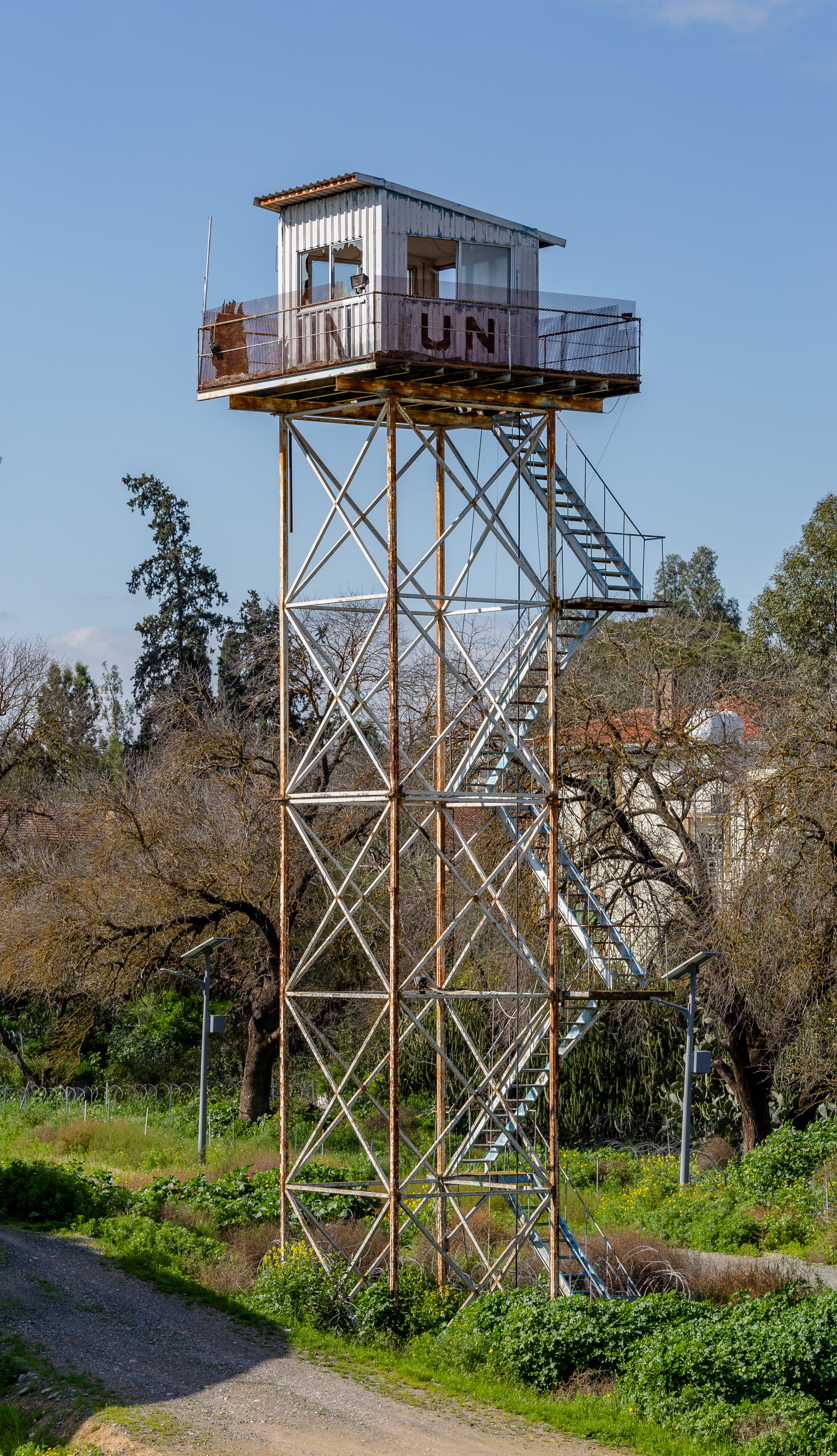
- UN tower in the buffer zone
- Date: 13 December 1974
- Meeting no.: 1,810
- Code: S/RES/365 (Document)
- Subject: Cyprus
- Result: Adopted

Security Council composition
- Permanent members: China; France; Soviet Union; United Kingdom; United States
- Non-permanent members: Australia; Austria; Byelorussian SSR; Cameroon; Costa Rica; Indonesia; Iraq; Kenya; Mauritania; Peru

United Nations Security Council Resolution 365, adopted on 13 December 1974, after receiving General Assembly resolution 3212 (which regarded the Cyprus Question) and noting with satisfaction in unanimous adoption the Council endorsed the General Assembly resolution and urges the parties concerned to implement it as soon as possible, requesting the Secretary-General to report on the progress of the implementation of this resolution.

No details of the voting were given, the resolution states it was adopted "by consensus".

== See also ==
- United Nations General Assembly Resolution 3212
- Cyprus dispute
- List of United Nations Security Council Resolutions 301 to 400 (1971–1976)
- Turkish Invasion of Cyprus
