= List of United Nations resolutions concerning Palestine =

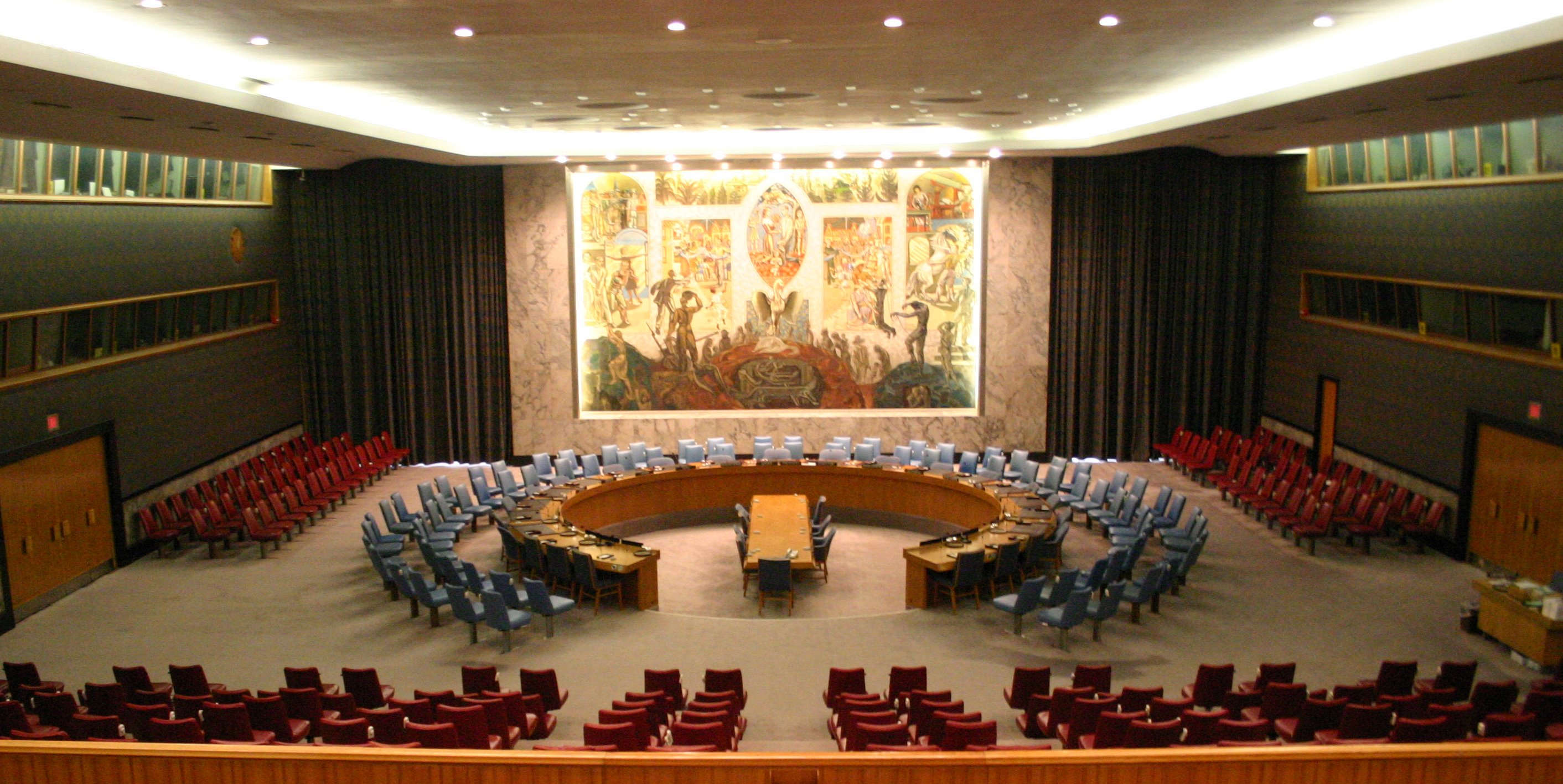
UN Security Council Chamber in New York City, United States

The following is a list of United Nations resolutions concerning Palestine. From 1967 to 1989 the United Nations Security Council adopted 131 resolutions directly addressing the Arab–Israeli conflict, with many concerning the Palestinians; Since 2012, a number of resolutions were issued dealing directly with the modern State of Palestine. The United Nations General Assembly also adopted resolutions.

== United Nations General Assembly resolutions ==
United Nations General Assembly resolutions include:

- 1947:
  - November 29: Resolution 181: Recommending partition of the Mandatory Palestine into Arab and Jewish states, and international status for the City of Jerusalem.
- 1948:
  - November 19: Resolution 212: Assistance to Palestinian refugees
  - December 11: Resolution 194: establishes Conciliation Commission; protection of and free access to Jerusalem and other Holy Places; Resolves that the refugees wishing to return to their homes and live at peace with their neighbours should be permitted to do so at the earliest practicable date, and that compensation should be paid for the property of those choosing not to return and for loss of or damage to property which, under principles of international law or in equity, should be made good by the Governments or authorities responsible
- 1949:
  - December 8: Resolution 302(IV): Assistance to Palestine refugees
  - December 9: Resolution 303(IV): International Regime for Jerusalem
  - December 10: Resolution 356: Jerusalem
- 1950:
  - December 2: Resolution 393: Assistance to Palestinian refugees
  - December 14: Resolution 394 (V): Calls for Arab-Israeli peace negotiations, and a solution for Palestinian refugees.
  - December 14: Resolution 468: Reduces financing for an international regime in Jerusalem.
- 1952:
  - January 26: Resolution 512: Report of the United Nations Conciliation Commission for Palestine.
  - January 26: Resolution 513: Assistance to Palestinian refugees.
  - November 6: Resolution 614: Assistance to Palestinian refugees.
  - November 25: Resolution 660: Report of the UN Relief and Works Agency for Palestine refugees (UNRWA).
- 1953:
  - November 27: Resolution 720: Assistance to Palestinian refugees.
  - November 27: Resolution 766: Accounts of UNRWA.
- 1954:
  - December 4: Resolution 818: Assistance to Palestinian refugees.
  - December 4: Resolution 879: Accounts of UNRWA.
- 1955:
  - December 3: Resolution 916: Assistance to Palestinian refugees.
  - December 3: Resolution 964: Accounts of UNRWA.
- 1956:
  - December 21: Resolution 1081: Accounts of UNRWA.
- 1957:
  - February 27: Resolution 1091: Palestinian refugees.
  - February 28: Resolution 1018: Palestinian refugees.
  - December 12: Resolution 1191.html: Palestinian refugees.
- 1958:
  - December 12: Resolution 1315: Palestinian refugees.
- 1959:
  - December 9: Resolution 1456: UNRWA.
- 1960:
  - December 18: Resolution 1545: Accounts of UNRWA.
- 1961:
  - April 21: Resolution 1604: Palestinian refugees
  - October 30: Resolution 1636: Accounts of UNRWA.
  - December 20: Resolution 1725: Palestinian refugees
- 1962:
  - December 11: Resolution 1789: Accounts of UNRWA.
  - December 20: Resolution 1856: Palestinian refugees
- 1963
  - June 27: UN Special Assembly Resolution 1874.
  - June 27: UN Special Assembly Resolution 1875.
  - November 6: Resolution 1890-C: Accounts of UNRWA.
  - December 3: Resolution 1912: Palestinian refugees
- 1965:
  - February 10: Resolution 2002: Palestinian refugees
  - December 13: Resolution 2047-C: Accounts of UNRWA.
  - December 13: Resolution 2048-C: Accounts of UNRWA.
  - December 15: Resolution 2052: UNRWA Report.
- 1966:
  - October 26: Resolution 2139-C: Accounts of UNRWA.
  - November 17: Resolution 2154: Palestinian refugees.
- 1967:
  - July 4: Resolution 2252: Humanitarian assistance in the 1967 war.
  - July 4: Resolution 2253 (ES-V): Condemns Israel's measures to change the status of Jerusalem as invalid
  - July 14: Resolution 2254: "Deplores" Israel's failure to abide by UN General Assembly Resolution 2253 (ES-V)
  - July 21: Resolution 2256: The Situation in the Middle East
  - September 18: Resolution 2257: The Situation in the Middle East.
  - November 16: Resolution 2264-D: Accounts of UNRWA.
  - December 19: Resolution 2341: Palestinian refugees
- 1968:
  - November 1: Resolution 2380-D: Accounts of UNRWA.
  - December 19: Resolution 2443: Establishes the Special Committee to Investigate Israeli Practices Affecting the Human Rights of the Palestinian People.
  - December 19: Resolution 2452: UNRWA Report.
- 1969:
  - December 5: Resolution 2522-D: Accounts of UNRWA.
  - December 10: Resolution 2535: UNRWA Report. "Reaffirms" the "inalienable rights" of the Palestinian people and requests the Security Council to take "effective measures" to force implementation of previous UN resolutions
  - December 11: Resolution 2546: Condemns Israeli "violations of human rights and fundamental freedoms" in the occupied territories
- 1970:
  - November 4: Resolution 2628: Urges the speedy implementation of UN Security Council Resolution 242 and recognizes that "respect for the rights of the Palestinians is an indisputable element in the establishment of a just and lasting peace in the Middle East"
  - December 4: Resolution 2653-D: Accounts of UNRWA.
  - December 5: Resolution 2727: Calls on Israel to implement the recommendations of the UN special committee investigating Israeli practices in the occupied territories
  - December 7: Resolution 2656: Establishment of a working group for the financing of UNRWA.
  - December 8: Resolution 2672: UNRWA Report.
  - December 15: Resolution 2728: Report of the Special Committee to investigate Israeli practices affecting the Human Rights of the population of the Occupied Territories.
  - December 16: Resolution 2729: Report of the working group on the financing of the UNRWA.
- 1971:
  - November 8: Resolution 2756-D: Accounts of UNRWA.
  - December 6: Resolution 2791: Working group for the financing of UNRWA.
  - December 6: Resolution 2792: UNRWA Report. Calls for the implementation of UN General Assembly Resolution 194, stresses the "inalienable rights of the people of Palestine", and calls on Israel to stop resettling the inhabitants of Palestinian refugee camps.
  - December 13: Resolution 2799: The Situation in the Middle East.
  - December 20: Resolution 2851: Report of the Special Committee to investigate Israeli practices affecting the Human Rights of the population of the Occupied Territories. Condemns Israeli practices in the occupied territories.
- 1972:
  - November 9: Resolution 2912-D: Accounts of UNRWA.
  - December 8: Resolution 2949: The Situation in the Middle East.
  - December 13: Resolution 2963: UNRWA Report.
  - December 13: Resolution 2964: Working Group on the financing of UNRWA.
  - December 15: Resolution 3005: Report of the Special Committee to investigate Israeli practices affecting the Human Rights of the population of the Occupied Territories.
- 1973:
  - October 17: Resolution 3053-D: Accounts of UNRWA.
  - December 7: Resolution 3089: UNRWA Report.
  - December 7: Resolution 3090: Working Group on the financing of UNRWA.
  - December 7: Resolution 3092: Report of the Special Committee to investigate Israeli practices affecting the Human Rights of the population of the Occupied Territories.
  - December 17: Resolution 3175: Permanent sovereignty over natural resources in the occupied Arab territories.
- 1974:
  - October 14: Resolution 3210: Invites the PLO to participate in General Assembly deliberations on the question of Palestine.
  - November 12: Resolution 3227-D: Accounts of UNRWA.
  - November 22: Resolution 3236: Recognizes the right of the Palestinian people to regain its rights, including the right to self-determination and the right of return.
  - November 22: Resolution 3237: Observer status for the PLO.
  - November 29: Resolution 3240: Report of the Special Committee to Investigate Israeli Practices Affecting the Human Rights of the Population of the Occupied Territories.
  - November 29: Resolution 3246: Affirms the legitimacy of armed resistance by oppressed peoples in pursuit of the right to self-determination, and condemns governments which do not support that right
  - December 16: Resolution 3330: Working Group on the financing of UNRWA.
  - December 17: Resolution 3331: UNRWA Report.
  - December 17: Resolution 3336: Permanent sovereignty over national resources in the occupied Arab territories.
- 1975:
  - October 30: Resolution 3370-C: Accounts of UNRWA.
  - November 10: Resolution 3375: Invitation to the Palestine Liberation Organization to participate in the efforts for peace in the Middle East.
  - November 10: Resolution 3376: Founding of the Committee on the Exercise of the Inalienable Rights of the Palestinian People (CEIRPP).
  - December 5: Resolution 3414: Calls for economic sanctions and an arms embargo on Israel until it withdraws from all territories occupied in 1967 and grants the Palestinians their "inalienable national rights".
  - December 8: Resolution 3419: UNRWA report.
  - December 15: Resolution 3516: Permanent sovereignty over national resources in the occupied Arab territories.
  - December 15: Resolution 3525: Report of the Special Committee to Investigate Israeli Practices Affecting the Human Rights of the Population of the Occupied Territories.
- 1976:
  - November 23: Resolution 31/15: UNRWA Report.
  - November 24: Resolution 31/20: Expresses deep concern that no "just solution" to the "problem of Palestine" has been achieved, refers to the problem as the core of the Middle East conflict, and reaffirms the "inalienable rights" of the Palestinians, including the right of return and the right to national independence.
  - November 29: Resolution 31/22-F: Accounts of UNRWA.
  - December 9: Resolution 31/62: Calls for an international Middle East peace conference under the auspices of the UN and co-chaired by the United States and Soviet Union.
  - December 16: Resolution 31/106: Report of the Special Committee to Investigate Israeli Practices Affecting the Human Rights of the Occupied Territories.
  - December 21: Resolution 31/186: Permanent sovereignty over national resources in the occupied Arab territories.
- 1977:
  - November 25: Resolution 32/20: Reaffirms previous calls for a full Israeli withdrawal from the occupied territories and an international peace conference with PLO participation.
  - December 2: Resolution 32/40: Reaffirms the "inalienable rights of the Palestinian people", including the right to national sovereignty and the right of return.
  - December 13: Resolution 32/90: UNRWA report.
  - December 13: Resolution 32/91: Report of the Special Committee to Investigate Israeli Practices Affecting the Human Rights of the Population of the Occupied Territories. Calls on Israel to respect the Geneva Conventions
  - December 15: Resolution 32/111: Health needs of Palestinian refugee children.
  - December 19: Resolution 32/161: Permanent sovereignty over national resources in the occupied Arab territories.
  - December 19: Resolution 32/171: Living conditions of the Palestinian people.
  - December 21: Resolution 32/212-III: Implications of extending to certain former staff members coverage by the UN Joint Staff Pension Fund for service with UNRWA.
- 1978:
  - December 7: Resolution 33/28: CEIRPP report.
  - December 7: Resolution 33/29: Reaffirms previous calls for a full Israeli withdrawal from the occupied territories and an international peace conference with PLO participation.
  - December 15: Resolution 33/81: Health needs of Palestinian refugee children.
  - December 18: Resolution 33/110: Living conditions of the Palestinian people.
  - December 18: Resolution 33/112: UNRWA report.
  - December 18: Resolution 33/113: Report of the Special Committee to Investigate Israeli Practices Affecting the Human Rights of the Population of the Occupied Territories.
  - December 20: Resolution 33/147: Assistance to the Palestinian people.
- 1979:
  - November 16: Resolution 34/29: Expressing concern over the deportation of the Bassam Shakaa, Mayor of Nablus, by Israel.
  - November 23: Resolution 34/52: UNRWA report.
  - November 29 and December 12: Resolution 34/65: CEIRPP report.
  - December 6: Resolution 34/70: Reaffirms previous calls for a full Israeli withdrawal from the occupied territories and an international peace conference with PLO participation.
  - December 11: Resolution 34/77: Calling for an establishment of a nuclear-weapon-free zone in the Middle East.
  - December 12: Resolution 34/90: Report of the Special Committee to Investigate Israeli Practices Affecting the Human Rights of the Population of the Occupied Territories.
  - December 14: Resolution 34/113: Living conditions of the Palestinian people.
  - December 14: Resolution 34/133: Assistance to the Palestinian people.
  - December 14: Resolution 34/136: Permanent sovereignty over national resources in the occupied Arab territories.
- 1980:
  - November 3: Resolution 35/13: UNRWA report.
  - December 5: Resolution 35/75: Living conditions of the Palestinian people.
  - December 5: Resolution 35/110: Permanent sovereignty over national resources in the occupied Arab territories.
  - December 5: Resolution 35/111: Assistance to the Palestinian people.
  - December 11: Resolution 35/122: Report of the Special Committee to Investigate Israeli Practices Affecting the Human Rights of the Population of the Occupied Territories.
  - December 15: Resolution 35/169: CEIRPP report.
  - December 16: Resolution 35/207: Reaffirms previous calls for a full Israeli withdrawal from the occupied territories and the establishment of a Palestinian state.
- 1981:
  - October 28: Resolution 36/15: Demanding that Israel desist any archaeological excavations in East-Jerusalem in general with emphasis on the Temple Mount.
  - December 4: Resolution 36/70: Assistance to the Palestinian people.
  - December 4: Resolution 36/73: Living conditions of the Palestinian people.
  - December 10: Resolution 36/120: CEIRPP report.
  - December 16: Resolution 36/146: UNRWA report.
  - December 16: Resolution 36/147: Report of the Special Committee to Investigate Israeli Practices Affecting the Human Rights of the Population of the Occupied Territories.
  - December 16: Resolution 36/150: Demands Israel to cease planning of a canal between the Dead Sea and the Mediterranean.
  - December 17: Resolution 36/173: Permanent sovereignty over national resources in the occupied Arab territories.
  - December 17: UN General Assembly Resolutions 36/226 A & B: Reaffirms previous calls for a full Israeli withdrawal from the occupied territories and the establishment of a Palestinian state.
- 1982:
  - February 5: Ninth Emergency Special Session ES/9-1: The situation in the occupied Arab territories.
  - November 16: Resolution 37/18: Condemns Israel refusal to implement Security Council resolution 487, and demands Israel to withdraw its threat to attack nuclear facilities of neighbouring nations.
  - December 10: Resolution 37/86: CEIRPP report.
  - December 10: Resolution 37/88: Report of the Special Committee to Investigate Israeli Practices Affecting the Human Rights of the Population of the Occupied Territories.
  - December 16: Resolution 37/120: UNRWA report.
  - December 16: Resolution 37/122: Demands Israel not to build a canal between the Dead Sea and the Mediterranean.
  - December 16: Resolution 37/123: Condemnation of Israel's alleged responsibility for the Sabra and Shatila massacre by Kataeb Party in Beirut, Lebanon; resolves that the massacre was an act of genocide; condemns acts of plundering Palestinian cultural heritage; condemns the occupation of the West Bank, Gaza and the Golan Heights; and condemns the annexation of Jerusalem.
  - December 17: Resolution 37/134: Assistance to the Palestinian people.
  - December 17: Resolution 37/135: Permanent sovereignty over national resources in the occupied Palestinian and other Arab territories.
  - December 20: Resolution 37/222: Living conditions of the Palestinian people in the occupied Palestinian territories.
- 1983:
  - December 13: Resolution 38/58: CEIRPP report.
  - December 15: Resolutions 38/79: Report of the Special Committee to Investigate Israeli Practices Affecting the Human Rights of the Population of the Occupied Territories.
  - December 15: Resolution 38/83: UNRWA report.
  - December 15: Resolution 38/85: Demands Israel not to build a canal between the Dead Sea and the Mediterranean.
  - December 19: Resolution 38/144: Permanent sovereignty over national resources in the occupied Palestinian and other Arab territories.
  - December 19: Resolution 38/145: Assistance to the Palestinian people.
  - December 19: Resolution 38/166: Living conditions of the Palestinian people in the occupied Palestinian territories.
  - December 19: Resolutions 38/180: Calls all nations to suspend or sever all diplomatic, economic and technological ties with Israel. Condemnation of Israel on various topics including the occupation of the West Bank, Gaza and the Golan Heights, war in Lebanon and the annexation of Jerusalem.
- 1984:
  - December 11: Resolution 39/49: CEIRPP report.
  - December 14: Resolutions 39/95: Report of the Special Committee to Investigate Israeli Practices Affecting the Human Rights of the Population of the Occupied Territories.
  - December 14: Resolutions 39/99: UNRWA report.
  - December 14: Resolution 39/101: Demands Israel not to build a canal between the Dead Sea and the Mediterranean.
  - December 17: Resolution 39/169: Living conditions of the Palestinian people in the occupied Palestinian territories.
  - December 18: Resolution 39/223: Economic development projects in the occupied Palestinian territories.
  - December 18: Resolution 39/224: Assistance to the Palestinian people.
- 1985:
  - December 12: Resolution 40/96: CEIRPP report.
  - December 16: Resolutions 40/161: Report of the Special Committee to Investigate Israeli Practices Affecting the Human Rights of the Population of the Occupied Territories.
  - December 16: Resolutions 40/165: UNRWA report.
  - December 16: Resolution 40/167: Decides to monitor Israel's decision to construct a canal between the Dead Sea and the Mediterranean.
  - December 17: Resolution 40/169: Economic development projects in the occupied Palestinian territories.
  - December 17: Resolution 40/170: Assistance to the Palestinian people.
  - December 17: Resolution 40/201: Living conditions of the Palestinian people in the occupied Palestinian territories.
- 1986:
  - December 2: Resolution 41/43: CEIRPP report.
  - December 3: Resolutions 41/63: Report of the Special Committee to Investigate Israeli Practices Affecting the Human Rights of the Population of the Occupied Territories.
  - December 3: Resolutions 41/69: UNRWA report.
  - December 8: Resolution 41/181: Assistance to the Palestinian people.
- 1987:
  - December 2: Resolution 42/66: CEIRPP report.
  - December 2: Resolutions 42/69: UNRWA report.
  - December 8: Resolutions 42/160: Report of the Special Committee to Investigate Israeli Practices Affecting the Human Rights of the Population of the Occupied Territories.
  - December 11: Resolution 42/166: Assistance to the Palestinian people.
  - December 11: Resolution 42/190: Living conditions of the Palestinian people in the occupied Palestinian territories.
- 1988:
  - April 20: Resolution 43/233: Expressing shock over killing of Palestinian civilians in Nahalin.
  - November 3: Resolution 43/21: The uprising (Intifada) of the Palestinian people.
  - December 6: Resolutions 43/57: UNRWA report.
  - December 6: Resolutions 43/58: Report of the Special Committee to Investigate Israeli Practices Affecting the Human Rights of the Population of the Occupied Territories.
  - December 7: Resolution 43/65: Calling for an establishment of a nuclear-weapon-free zone in the Middle East.
  - December 15: Resolution 43/175: CEIRPP report.
  - December 15: UN General Assembly Resolution 43/176: International Peace Conference; principles for peace
  - December 15: UN General Assembly Resolution 43/177: Acknowledges the proclamation of the State of Palestine on 15 November 1988.
  - December 20: Resolution 43/178: Assistance to the Palestinian people.
- 2004
  - 6 May: United Nations General Assembly Resolution 58/292: Affirmed that the status of the Palestinian territory occupied since 1967.
- 2012
  - November 29: United Nations General Assembly resolution 67/19: Made Palestine a non-member observer state.
  - December 22: United Nations General Assembly Resolution 66/225: Permanent sovereignty of the Palestinian people in the Occupied Palestinian Territory.
- 2017
  - 21 December: Resolution ES-10/19: Criticizing US policy on Jerusalem.
- 2018
  - 13 June: Resolution ES-10/20: Criticizing the Israeli response to the 2018 Gaza border protests.
  - October 16: United Nations General Assembly Resolution 73/5: Appoints Palestine as presiding chair for the 2019 sessions for the Group of 77.
- 2023
  - 27 October: Resolution ES-10/21: Criticizing Hamas actions in the Gaza war.
  - 12 December: Resolution ES-10/22: Calling for immediate ceasefire and hostage release in the Gaza war.
- 2024
  - 10 May: Resolution ES-10/23: Upgrades Palestine's rights in the United Nations as an Observer State.

== United Nations Security Council resolutions ==
United Nations Security Council resolutions include:

1. Resolution 42: The Palestine Question (5 March 1948) Requests recommendations for the Palestine Commission
2. Resolution 43: The Palestine Question (1 Apr 1948) Recognizes "increasing violence and disorder in Palestine" and requests that representatives of "the Jewish Agency for Palestine and the Arab Higher Committee" arrange, with the Security Council, "a truce between the Arab and Jewish Communities of Palestine ... Calls upon Arab and Jewish armed groups in Palestine to cease acts of violence immediately."
3. Resolution 44: The Palestine Question (1 Apr 1948) Requests convocation of special session of the General Assembly
4. Resolution 46: The Palestine Question (17 Apr 1948) As the United Kingdom is the Mandatory Power, "it is responsible for the maintenance of peace and order in Palestine." The Resolutions also "Calls upon all persons and organizations in Palestine" to stop importing "armed bands and fighting personnel ... whatever their origin; ... weapons and war materials; ... Refrain, pending the future government of Palestine...from any political activity which might prejudice the rights, claims, or position of either community; ... refrain from any action which will endanger the safety of the Holy Places in Palestine."
5. Resolution 48: April 23, 1948, calls on all concerned parties to comply with UNSC Resolution 46 and establishes a Truce Commission for Palestine to assist the SC in implementing the truce. Approved 8–0, abstentions from Colombia, Ukrainian SSR and USSR.
6. Resolution 49: May 22, 1948 issues a cease-fire order to come into effect at noon, May 24, 1948, New York City local time. Orders the Truce Commission for Palestine previously set up to report on compliance. Adopted by 8–0, abstentions from Ukrainian SSR, USSR and Syria.
7. Resolution 50: May 29, 1948, calls for a four-week ceasefire covering Palestine, Egypt, Iraq, Lebanon, Saudi Arabia, Syria, Transjordan and Yemen. Urges all to protect the Holy Places and Jerusalem. Offers the UN Mediator as many military observers as necessary. Further violations and the Council would consider action under Chapter VII of the UN Charter. Adopted in parts; no voting on the resolution as a whole.
8. Resolution 53: The Palestine Question (7 Jul 1948)
9. Resolution 54: The Palestine Question (15 Jul 1948)
10. Resolution 56: The Palestine Question (19 Aug 1948)
11. Resolution 57: The Palestine Question (18 Sep 1948)
12. Resolution 59: The Palestine Question (19 Oct 1948)
13. Resolution 60: The Palestine Question (29 Oct 1948)
14. Resolution 61: The Palestine Question (4 Nov 1948)
15. Resolution 62: The Palestine Question (16 Nov 1948)
16. Resolution 66: The Palestine Question (29 Dec 1948)
17. Resolution 69: Israel's admission to the UN (04 Mar 1949)
18. Resolution 72: The Palestine Question (11 Aug 1949)
19. Resolution 73: The Palestine Question (11 Aug 1949)
20. Resolution 89 (17 November 1950), regarding Armistice in 1948 Arab–Israeli War and "transfer of persons".
21. Resolution 92: The Palestine Question (8 May 1951)
22. Resolution 93: The Palestine Question (18 May 1951)
23. Resolution 95: The Palestine Question (1 Sep 1951)
24. Resolution 100: The Palestine Question (27 Oct 1953)
25. Resolution 101: The Palestine Question (24 Nov 1953)
26. Resolution 106: The Palestine Question (29 Mar 1955) 'condemns' Israel for Gaza raid.
27. Resolution 107: The Palestine Question (30 March)
28. Resolution 108: The Palestine Question (8 September)
29. Resolution 113: The Palestine Question (4 April)
30. Resolution 114: The Palestine Question (4 June)
31. Resolution 127: The Palestine Question (January 22, 1958) " ... 'recommends' Israel suspends its 'no-man's zone' in Jerusalem".
32. Resolution 228: The Palestine Question (November 25, 1966) " ... 'censures' Israel for its attack on Samu in the West Bank, then under Jordanian control".
33. Resolution 233 Six-Day War (June 6, 1967)
34. Resolution 234 Six-Day War (June 7, 1967)
35. Resolution 235 Six-Day War (June 9, 1967)
36. Resolution 236 Six-Day War (June 11, 1967)
37. Resolution 237: Six-Day War June 14, 1967): Urges Israel to allow the return of new 1967 Palestinian refugees and called on Israel to ensure the safety and welfare of inhabitants of areas where fighting had taken place.
38. Resolution 240 (October 25, 1967): Concerning violations of the cease-fire.
39. Resolution 242 (November 22, 1967): Termination of all claims or states of belligerency and respect for and acknowledgment of the sovereignty, territorial integrity and political independence of every State in the area. Calls on Israel's neighbors to end the state of belligerency and calls upon Israel to reciprocate by withdrawing its forces from land claimed by other parties in the 1967 war. Interpreted commonly today as calling for the land for peace principle as a way to resolve Arab–Israeli conflict.
40. Resolution 248: (March 24, 1968) " ... 'condemns' Israel for its massive attack on Karameh in Jordan".
41. Resolution 250: (April 27) " ... 'calls' on Israel to refrain from holding military parade in Jerusalem".
42. Resolution 251: (May 2) " ... 'deeply deplores' Israeli military parade in Jerusalem in defiance of Resolution 250".
43. Resolution 252: (May 21) " ... 'declares invalid' Israel's acts to unify Jerusalem as Jewish capital".
44. Resolution 256: (August 16) " ... 'condemns' Israeli raids on Jordan as 'flagrant violation".
45. Resolution 258: (September 18) ... expressed 'concern' with the welfare of the inhabitants of the Israeli-occupied territories, and requested a special representative to be sent to report on the implementation of Resolution 237, and that Israel cooperate.
46. Resolution 259: (September 27) " ... 'deplores' Israel's refusal to accept UN mission to probe occupation".
47. Resolution 262: (December 31) " ... 'condemns' Israel for attack on Beirut airport".
48. Resolution 265: (April 1, 1969) " ... 'condemns' Israel for air attacks on Salt".
49. Resolution 267: (July 3) " ... 'censures' Israel for administrative acts to change the status of Jerusalem".
50. Resolution 270: (August 26) " ... 'condemns' Israel for air attacks on villages in southern Lebanon".
51. Resolution 271: (September 15) " ... 'condemns' Israel's failure to obey UN resolutions on Jerusalem".
52. Resolution 279: (May 12, 1970) "Demands the immediate withdrawal of all Israeli armed forces from Lebanese territory."(full text)
53. Resolution 280: (May 19) " ... 'condemns' Israeli's attacks against Lebanon".
54. Resolution 285: (September 5) " ... 'demands' immediate Israeli withdrawal from Lebanon".
55. Resolution 298: (September 25, 1971) " ... 'deplores' Israel's changing of the status of Jerusalem".
56. Resolution 313: (February 28, 1972) " ... 'demands' that Israel stop attacks against Lebanon".
57. Resolution 316: (June 26) " ... 'condemns' Israel for repeated attacks on Lebanon".
58. Resolution 317: (July 21) " ... 'deplores' Israel's refusal to release Arabs abducted in Lebanon".
59. Resolution 331: (April 20, 1973)
60. Resolution 332: (April 21) " ... 'condemns' Israel's repeated attacks against Lebanon".
61. Resolution 337: (August 15) " ... 'condemns' Israel for violating Lebanon's sovereignty and territorial integrity and for the forcible diversion and seizure of a Lebanese airliner from Lebanon's air space".
62. Resolution 338 (22 October 1973): " ...'calls' for a cease fire" in Yom Kippur War and "the implementation of Security Council Resolution 242 (1967) in all of its parts", and "Decides that, immediately and concurrently with the cease-fire, negotiations shall start between the parties concerned under appropriate auspices aimed at establishing a just and durable peace in the Middle East."
63. Resolution 339 (23 October 1973): Confirms Res. 338, dispatch UN observers.
64. Resolution 340 (25 October): "Demands that immediate and complete cease-fire be observed, per 338 and 339, and requests to increase the number of United Nations military observers
65. Resolution 341 (27 October): "Approves the report on the implementation resolution 340
66. Resolution 344 (15 December)
67. Resolution 346 (April 8, 1974)
68. Resolution 347 (April 24): " ... 'condemns' Israeli attacks on Lebanon".
69. Resolution 350 (31 May 1974) established the United Nations Disengagement Observer Force, to monitor the ceasefire between Israel and Syria in the wake of the Yom Kippur War.
70. Resolution 363 (November 29)
71. Resolution 368 (April 17, 1975), called on the parties involved in the prevailing state of tension in the Middle East to immediately implement Resolution 338.
72. Resolution 369 (May 28, 1975), expressed concern over the prevailing state of tension in the Middle East, reaffirmed that the two previous agreements were only a step towards the implementation of Resolution 338 and called on the parties to implement it, and extended the mandate of the United Nations Disengagement Observer Force.
73. Resolution 371, expressed concern at a lack of progress towards a lasting peace in the Middle East.
74. Resolution 390, considered a report regarding the United Nations Disengagement Observer Force and extended its mandate, noted the efforts to establish peace in the Middle East, but expressed concern over the prevailing state of tensions, and called for the implementation of Resolution 338.
75. Resolution 396
76. Resolution 408
77. Resolution 416
78. Resolution 420, regarding the United Nations Disengagement Observer Force.
79. Resolution 425 (1978): " ... 'calls' on Israel to withdraw its forces from Lebanon". Israel's withdrawal from Lebanon was completed by 16 June 2000.
80. Resolution 426, established the United Nations Interim Force in Lebanon (UNIFIL).
81. Resolution 427: " ... 'calls' on Israel to complete its withdrawal from Lebanon".
82. Resolution 429
83. Resolution 434, renewed the mandate of UNIFIL and called upon Israel and Lebanon to implement prior resolutions.
84. Resolution 438
85. Resolution 441
86. Resolution 444: " ... 'deplores' Israel's lack of cooperation with UN peacekeeping forces".
87. Resolution 446 (1979): 'determines' that Israeli settlements are a 'serious obstruction' to peace and calls on Israel to abide by the Fourth Geneva Convention".
88. Resolution 449, regarding the United Nations Disengagement Observer Force.
89. Resolution 450: " ... 'calls' on Israel to stop attacking Lebanon".
90. Resolution 452: " ... 'calls' on Israel to cease building settlements in occupied territories".
91. Resolution 456, regarding the United Nations Disengagement Observer Force.
92. Resolution 459, regarding UNIFIL.
93. Resolution 465: " ... 'deplores' Israel's settlements and asks all member states not to assist Israel's settlements program".
94. Resolution 467: " ... 'strongly deplores' Israel's military intervention in Lebanon".
95. Resolution 468: " ... 'calls' on Israel to rescind illegal expulsions of two Palestinian mayors and a judge and to facilitate their return".
96. Resolution 469: " ... 'strongly deplores' Israel's failure to observe the council's order not to deport Palestinians".
97. Resolution 470, regarding the United Nations Disengagement Observer Force.
98. Resolution 471: " ... 'expresses deep concern' at Israel's failure to abide by the Fourth Geneva Convention".
99. Resolution 474, regarding the United Nations Disengagement Observer Force.
100. Resolution 476: Reiterates that Israel's claim to Jerusalem is 'null and void'. The altering of the status of Jerusalem constitutes a flagrant violation of the 4th Geneva Convention.
101. Resolution 478 (20 August 1980): 'censures (Israel) in the strongest terms' for its claim to Jerusalem in its 'Basic Law'.
102. Resolution 481, regarding the United Nations Disengagement Observer Force.
103. Resolution 483, noted the continuing need for UNIFIL given the situation between Israel and Lebanon, and extended its mandate.
104. Resolution 484: " ... 'declares it imperative' that Israel re-admit two deported Palestinian mayors".
105. Resolution 485, regarding the United Nations Disengagement Observer Force.
106. Resolution 487: " ... 'strongly condemns' Israel for its attack on Iraq's nuclear facility".
107. Resolution 488, regarding UNIFIL.
108. Resolution 493, regarding the United Nations Disengagement Observer Force.
109. Resolution 498: " ... 'calls' on Israel to withdraw from Lebanon".
110. Resolution 501: " ... 'calls' on Israel to stop attacks against Lebanon and withdraw its troops".
111. Resolution 506, regarding the United Nations Disengagement Observer Force.
112. Resolution 508: demanded an end to hostilities between Israel and the PLO taking place in Lebanon, and called for a cease-fire.
113. Resolution 509: " ... 'demands' that Israel withdraw its forces forthwith and unconditionally from Lebanon".
114. Resolution 511, extended the mandate of UNIFIL.
115. Resolution 515: " ... 'demands' that Israel lift its siege of Beirut and allow food supplies to be brought in".
116. Resolution 516, demanded an immediate cessation of military activities in Lebanon, noting violations of the cease-fire in Beirut.
117. Resolution 517: " ... 'censures' Israel for failing to obey UN resolutions and demands that Israel withdraw its forces from Lebanon".
118. Resolution 518: " ... 'demands' that Israel cooperate fully with UN forces in Lebanon".
119. Resolution 519, extended the mandate of UNIFIL, and authorized it to carry out humanitarian tasks.
120. Resolution 520: " ... 'condemns' Israel's attack into West Beirut".
121. Resolution 523, regarding UNIFIL
122. Resolution 524
123. Resolution 529
124. Resolution 531
125. Resolution 536
126. Resolution 538
127. Resolution 543
128. Resolution 549
129. Resolution 551
130. Resolution 555
131. Resolution 557
132. Resolution 561
133. Resolution 563
134. Resolution 573: " ... 'condemns' Israel 'vigorously' for bombing Tunisia in attack on PLO headquarters.
135. Resolution 575
136. Resolution 576
137. Resolution 583
138. Resolution 584
139. Resolution 586
140. Resolution 587 " ... 'takes note' of previous calls on Israel to withdraw its forces from Lebanon and urges all parties to withdraw".
141. Resolution 592: " ... 'strongly deplores' the killing of Palestinian students at Birzeit University by Israeli troops".
142. Resolution 594
143. Resolution 596
144. Resolution 599
145. Resolution 603
146. Resolution 605: " ... 'strongly deplores' Israel's policies and practices denying the human rights of Palestinians.
147. Resolution 607: " ... 'calls' on Israel not to deport Palestinians and strongly requests it to abide by the Fourth Geneva Convention.
148. Resolution 608: " ... 'deeply regrets' that Israel has defied the United Nations and deported Palestinian civilians".
149. Resolution 609
150. Resolution 611: "... condemned Israel's assassination of Khalil al-Wazir as a 'flagrant violation of the Charter'
151. Resolution 613
152. Resolution 617
153. Resolution 624
154. Resolution 630
155. Resolution 633
156. Resolution 636: " ... 'deeply regrets' Israeli deportation of Palestinian civilians.
157. Resolution 639 (31 Jul 1989)
158. Resolution 641 (30 Aug 1989): " ... 'deplores' Israel's continuing deportation of Palestinians.
159. Resolution 645 (29 Nov 1989)
160. Resolution 655 (31 May 1990)
161. Resolution 672 (12 Oct 1990): " ... 'condemns' Israel for "violence against Palestinians" at the Haram al-Sharif/Temple Mount.
162. Resolution 679 (30 Nov 1990)
163. Resolution 681 (20 Dec 1990): " ... 'deplores' Israel's resumption of the deportation of Palestinians.
164. Resolution 684 (30 Jan 1991)
165. Resolution 694 (24 May 1991): " ... 'deplores' Israel's deportation of Palestinians and calls on it to ensure their safe and immediate return.
166. Resolution 695 (30 May 1991)
167. Resolution 701 (31 Jul 1991)
168. Resolution 722 (29 Nov 1991)
169. Resolution 726 (06 Jan 1992): " ... 'strongly condemns' Israel's deportation of Palestinians.
170. Resolution 734 (29 Jan 1992)
171. Resolution 756 (29 May 1992)
172. Resolution 768 (30 Jul 1992)
173. Resolution 790 (25 Nov 1992)
174. Resolution 799 (18 Dec 1992): " ... 'strongly condemns' Israel's deportation of 413 Palestinians and calls for their immediate return.
175. Resolution 803 (28 Jan 1993)
176. Resolution 830 (26 May 1993)
177. Resolution 852 (28 Jul 1993)
178. Resolution 887 (29 Nov 1993)
179. Resolution 895 (28 Jan 1994)
180. Resolution 904 (18 Mar 1994): Cave of the Patriarchs massacre.
181. Resolution 1073 (28 Sep 1996) on the status of Jerusalem
182. Resolution 1322 (7 Oct 2000) deplored Ariel Sharon's visit to the Temple Mount and the violence that followed
183. Resolution 1397 (12 Mar 2002) the first resolution to explicitly call for a two-state solution.
184. Resolution 1435 (24 Sep 2002) demanded an end to Israeli measures in and around Ramallah, and an Israeli withdrawal to positions held before September 2000.
185. Resolution 1559 (2 September 2004) called upon Lebanon to establish its sovereignty over all of its land and called upon
186. Resolution 1860 (9 January 2009) called for the full cessation of war between Israel and Hamas.
187. Resolution 2334 (23 December 2016) called for an end to Israeli settlement building
188. Resolution 2712 (15 November 2023)
189. Resolution 2720 (22 December 2023)
190. Resolution 2728 (25 March 2024)
191. Resolution 2735 (10 June 2024) backed a hostage and ceasefire proposal in the Gaza war and reiterated support for a two-state solution
192. Resolution 2803 (17 November 2025) gives effect to the Gaza peace plan

== Yearly compilations ==
The Permanent Observer of Palestine to the United Nations has published annual compilations of resolutions concerning the "Question of Palestine" as from 1947, with text and votes, along with some additional information.

== See also ==
- Israel and the United Nations
- Palestine and the United Nations
- List of vetoed United Nations Security Council resolutions
- List of United Nations resolutions concerning Israel
- Draft United Nations resolution on Israeli settlements, 2011
- UN Watch
- League of Nations
