= List of United Nations Security Council Resolutions 1 to 100 =

This is a list of United Nations Security Council Resolutions 1 to 100 adopted between 25 January 1946 and 27 October 1953.

Resolution	Date	Vote	Concerns
1	25 January 1946	Adopted without vote	Establishing the Military Staff Committee
2	30 January 1946	11–0–0	The Iran crisis of 1946
3	4 April 1946	9–0–0 (present not voting: Australia; absent: USSR)	Soviet troops in Iran
4	29 April 1946	10–0–1 (abstention: USSR)	Condemning Francoist Spain
5	8 May 1946	10–0–0 (absent: USSR)	Soviet troops in Iran
6	17 May 1946	11–0–0	Procedural matters regarding admissions
7	26 June 1946	Resolution was adopted in parts, no vote taken on text as a whole	Condemning Francoist Spain, continued monitoring of the situation
8	29 August 1946	10–0–1 (abstention: Australia)	Admission of Afghanistan, Iceland and Sweden
9	15 October 1946	11–0–0	Jurisdiction of the International Court of Justice
10	4 November 1946	11–0–0	Determining Spain no longer warranted observation by the Council
11	15 November 1946	Adopted without vote	Switzerland and the International Court of Justice
12	10 December 1946	11–0–0 (paragraphs 1 & 2); "majority vote" (paragraph 3)	British troops in Greece
13	12 December 1946	11–0–0	Admission of Siam (Thailand)
14	16 December 1946	9–0–2 (abstentions: USSR, USA)	Terms of Presidency of the Security Council
15	19 December 1946	11–0–0	Greek–Albanian and Bulgarian–Yugoslavian border violations
16	10 January 1947	10–0–1 (abstention: Australia)	Recognising the establishment of the Free Territory of Trieste
17	10 February 1947	9–0–2 (abstentions: Poland, USSR)	Executions of political prisoners in Greece, Albania, Bulgaria and Yugoslavia
18	13 February 1947	10–0–1 (abstention: USSR)	Creation of a commission relating to armament regulation and reduction
19	27 February 1947	8–0–3 (abstentions: Poland, Syria, USSR)	Straits of Corfu incidents
20	10 March 1947	11–0–0	Review of report by the Atomic Energy Commission
21	2 April 1947	11–0–0	Trusteeship of strategic areas: German Pacific Islands
22	9 April 1947	8–0–2 (abstentions: Poland, USSR; present not voting: United Kingdom)	Corfu Channel incidents
23	18 April 1947	9–0–2 (abstentions: Poland, USSR)	Extending and enlarging commission relating to the "Greek Question"
24	30 April 1947	10–0–1 (abstention: Australia)	Admission of Hungary
25	23 May 1947	10–0–1 (abstention: Australia)	Admission of Italy
26	4 June 1947	11–0–0	Procedure relating to the International Court of Justice
27	1 August 1947	To invite Indonesia: 8–0–3 (abstentions: France, Belgium, United Kingdom); To invite the Philippines: 9–0–2 (abstentions: Poland, USSR)	The Indonesian National Revolution
28	6 August 1947	10–0–1 (abstention: USSR)	Sub-committee relating to the "Greek Question"
29	12 August 1947	Admission of Yemen, Pakistan adopted 11–0–0	Admission of Yemen, Pakistan
30	25 August 1947	7–0–4 (abstentions: Colombia, Poland, USSR, United Kingdom)	Indonesian National Revolution
31	25 August 1947	8–0–3 (abstentions: Poland, Syria, USSR)	Committee relating to resolution of the Indonesian National Revolution
32	26 August 1947	10–0–1 (abstention: United Kingdom)	Condemning continued violence in Indonesia
33	27 August 1947	10–0–1 (abstention: Australia)	Reviewing General Assembly views on rules of procedure of the Council
34	15 September 1947	9–2–0 (against: Poland, USSR)	Removing disputes between Greece & Albania and Yugoslavia & Bulgaria
35	3 October 1947	9–0–2 (abstentions: Poland, USSR)	Work schedule of committee relating to the revolution in Indonesia
36	1 November 1947	7–1–3 (against: Poland; abstentions: Colombia, Syria, USSR)	Calling on parties involved in Indonesia to implement prior resolutions
37	9 December 1947	Adopted without vote	Procedure relating to application of new Member States
38	17 January 1948	9–0–2 (abstentions: Ukraine, USSR)	India, Pakistan and Kashmir conflict
39	20 January 1948	9–0–2 (abstentions: Ukraine, USSR)	Proposal to establish committee relating to India, Pakistan and Kashmir
40	28 February 1948	8–0–3 (abstentions: Argentina, Ukraine, USSR)	Monitoring of the situation in Indonesia
41	28 February 1948	7–0–4 (abstentions: Colombia, Syria, Ukraine, USSR)	Commending truce signed in Indonesia
42	5 March 1948	8–0–3 (abstentions: Argentina, Syria, United Kingdom)	Requesting to be informed of the situation in Palestine
43	1 April 1948	11–0–0	Requesting representatives relating to the situation in Palestine
44	1 April 1948	9–0–2 (abstentions: Ukraine, USSR)	Calling for a special session of the General Assembly relating to Palestine
45	10 April 1948	10–0–1 (abstention: Argentina)	Admission of Burma
46	17 April 1948	9–0–2 (abstentions: Ukraine, USSR)	Calling for an end of hostilities in Palestine
47	21 April 1948	Resolution was adopted in parts, no vote taken on text as a whole	Increasing commission relating India, Pakistan, and Kashmir
48	23 April 1948	8–0–3 (abstentions: Colombia, Ukraine, USSR)	Establishing the Truce Commission for Palestine
49	22 May 1948	8–0–3 (abstentions: Syria, Ukraine, USSR)	Ordering a ceasefire in Palestine
50	29 May 1948	Resolution was adopted in parts, no vote taken on text as a whole	Ordering a cessation of the conflict in Palestine
51	3 June 1948	8–0–3 (abstentions: Republic of China, Ukraine, USSR)	Commission relating to India, Pakistan, and Kashmir
52	22 June 1948	9–0–2 (abstentions: Ukraine, USSR)	Reviewing second and third reports from United Nations Atomic Energy Commission
53	7 July 1948	8–0–3 (abstentions: Syria, Ukraine, USSR)	Urgent appeal to pro-long the truce in Palestine
54	15 July 1948	7–1–3 (against: Syria; abstentions: Argentina, Ukraine, USSR)	Ceasefire in Palestine
55	29 July 1948	9–0–2 (Abstentions: Ukraine, USSR)	Calling on Indonesia and the Netherlands to implement the Renville Agreement
56	19 August 1948	Resolution was adopted in parts, no vote taken on text as a whole	Truce in Palestine
57	18 September 1948	11–0–0	Assassination of Folke Bernadotte
58	28 September 1948	Adopted without vote	Switzerland and the International Court of Justice
59	19 October 1948	Adopted without vote	Assassination of Folke Bernadotte, previous resolutions on Palestine
60	29 October 1948	Adopted without vote	Establishment of sub-committee on Palestine
61	4 November 1948	9–1–1 (against: Ukraine; abstention: USSR)	Truce and committee on Palestine
62	16 November 1948	Resolution was adopted in parts, no vote taken on text as a whole	Calling for an armistice in Palestine
63	24 December 1948	7–0–4 (abstentions: Belgium, France, Ukraine, USSR)	Requesting cessation of hostilities and release of political prisoners in Indonesia
64	28 December 1948	8–0–3 (abstentions: Belgium, France, United Kingdom)	Demanding the Netherlands release political prisoners and the President of Indonesia
65	28 December 1948	9–0–2 (abstentions: Ukraine, USSR)	Requesting a report on the situation in Indonesia
66	29 December 1948	8–0–3 (abstentions: Ukraine, USSR, United States)	Demanding implementation of Resolution 61 in Palestine
67	28 January 1949	Resolution was adopted in parts, no vote taken on text as a whole	Calling for the creation of the 'United States of Indonesia'
68	10 February 1949	9–0–2 (abstentions: Ukraine, USSR)	General Assembly Resolution and the Commission for Conventional Armaments
69	4 March 1949	9–1–1 (against: Egypt; abstention: United Kingdom)	Admission of Israel
70	7 March 1949	8–0–3 (abstentions: Egypt, Ukraine, USSR)	Reports relating to trusteeship of strategic areas
71	27 June 1949	9–0–2 (abstentions: Ukraine, USSR)	Liechtenstein and the International Court of Justice
72	11 August 1949	Adopted without vote	Tributes to military observers in Palestine
73	11 August 1949	9–0–2 (abstentions: Ukraine, USSR)	Armistice agreements in Palestine
74	16 September 1949	9–0–2 (abstentions: Ukraine, USSR)	Transferring Atomic Energy Commission resolutions to the General Assembly
75	27 September 1949	7–1–3 (against: Ukraine; abstentions: Cuba, Egypt, USSR)	Reimbursement for nations assisting in Commissions in Indonesia, India and Pakistan
76	5 October 1949	9–1–1 (against: Ukraine; abstention: USSR)	Future cost of observers in Indonesia
77	11 October 1949	9–0–2 (abstentions: Ukraine, USSR)	Report from Commission for Conventional Armaments and the General Assembly
78	18 October 1949	9–0–2 (abstentions: Ukraine, USSR)	Report from Commission for Conventional Armaments and the General Assembly
79	17 January 1950	9–0–0 (present not voting: Yugoslavia; absent: USSR)	General Assembly and Commission for Conventional Armaments
80	14 March 1950	8–0–2 (abstentions: India, Yugoslavia; absent: USSR)	Commending India, Pakistan and Kashmir for ceasefire agreements
81	24 May 1950	10–0–0 (absent: USSR)	General Assembly Resolution 258
82	25 June 1950	9–0–1 (abstention: Yugoslavia; absent: USSR)	Determining North Korea's actions constitute a breach of the peace
83	27 June 1950	7–1–0 (against: Yugoslavia; present not voting: Egypt, India; absent: USSR)	Calling for the cessation of activities in Korea
84	7 July 1950	7–0–3 (abstentions: Egypt, India, Yugoslavia; absent: USSR)	Assistance to South Korea, determining North Korea broke the peace
85	31 July 1950	9–0–1 (abstention: Yugoslavia; absent: USSR)	Request for supporting the United Nations Command in Korea
86	26 September 1950	10–0–1 (abstention: Republic of China)	Admission of Indonesia
87	29 September 1950	7–3–1 (against: Republic of China, United States, Cuba; abstention: Egypt)	Declaration by the People's Republic of China (PRC) of an invasion of Taiwan
88	8 November 1950	8–2–1 (against: Republic of China, Cuba; abstention: Egypt)	Summoning representative of the PRC to be present in discussion on Korean War
89	17 November 1950	9–0–2 (abstentions: Egypt, USSR)	Complaints regarding expulsion of Palestinian people
90	31 January 1951	11–0–0	Removal of Korean War from Council's agenda
91	30 March 1951	8–0–3 (abstentions: India, USSR, Yugoslavia)	Resignation of UN Representative for India and Pakistan and new appointment
92	8 May 1951	10–0–1 (abstention: USSR)	Calling for ceasefire in Palestine
93	18 May 1951	10–0–1 (abstention: USSR)	General Armistice Agreement in the Middle East
94	29 May 1951	11–0–0	Death and election of judge to the International Court of Justice
95	1 September 1951	8–0–3 (abstentions: Republic of China, India, USSR)	Criticizing Egypt in the Arab-Israeli Conflict
96	10 November 1951	9–0–2 (abstentions: India, USSR)	Declaration by India and Pakistan of peaceful settlement in Kashmir
97	30 January 1952	11–0–0	Dissolving the Commission for Conventional Armaments
98	23 December 1952	9–0–1 (abstention: USSR; present not voting: Pakistan)	Calling for negotiations between India and Pakistan
99	12 August 1953	Adopted without vote	Resignation of judge and election to the International Court of Justice
100	27 October 1953	11–0–0	Suspension of work in the demilitarized zone in Palestine

== See also ==
- Lists of United Nations Security Council resolutions
- List of United Nations Security Council Resolutions 101 to 200
- List of United Nations Security Council resolutions concerning North Korea
