= List of United Nations Security Council resolutions concerning North Korea =

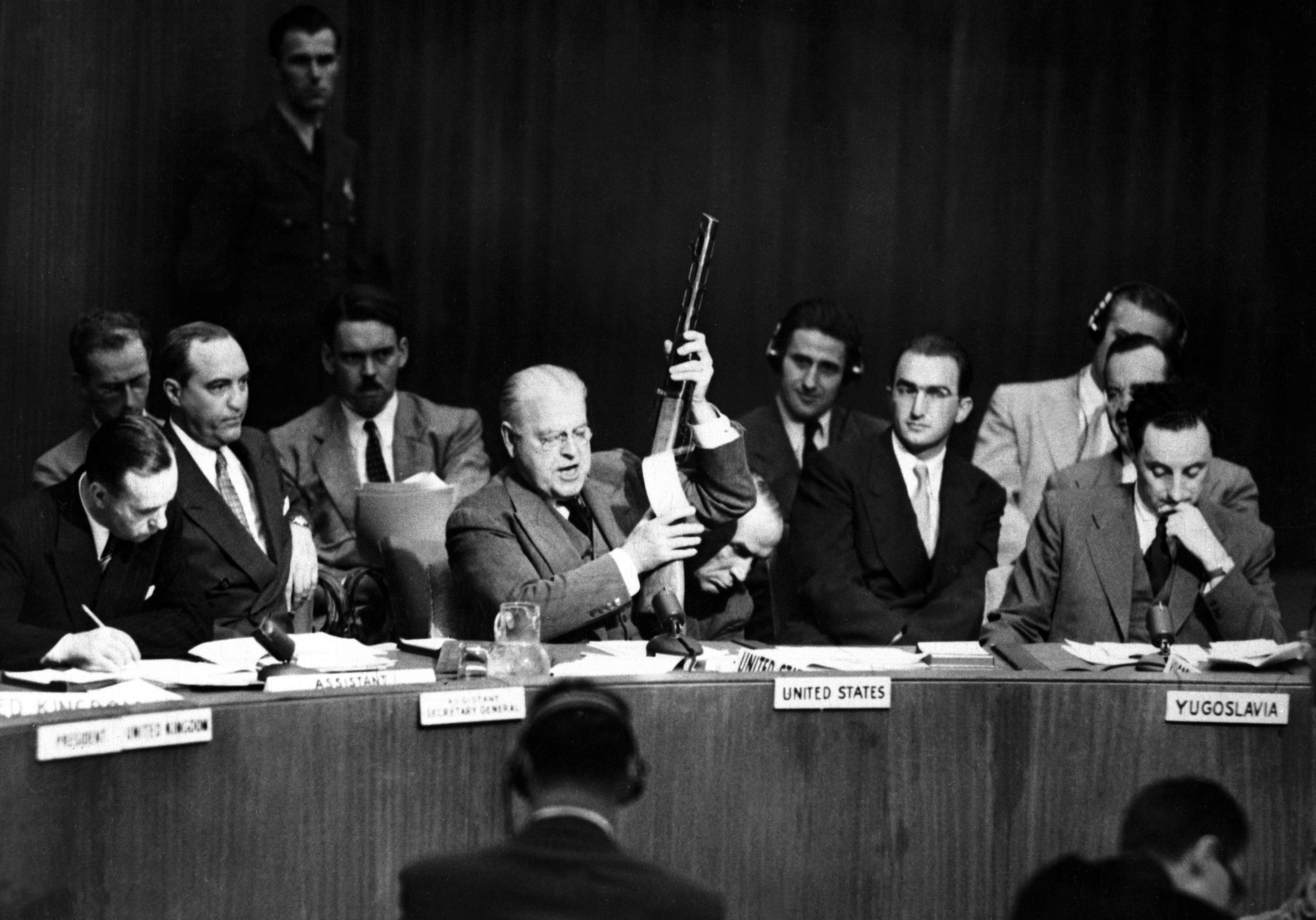
U.S. Ambassador to the UN Warren Austin demonstrates a Soviet-made submachine gun to the Security Council during the Korean War.

The Security Council of the United Nations (UNSC) has adopted 21 resolutions concerning North Korea. Five resolutions were adopted during the Korean War in the early 1950s.

A single resolution was adopted in 1991 regarding North Korea's accession to membership in the UN. Many resolutions since then have been adopted in relation to the North Korean missile and nuclear program.

== Background ==
- The UN Security Council toughens the sanctions in response to North Korea's nuclear and missile tests.
- The sanctions on North Korea are mainly economic in nature, regulating North Korea's economic activities such as trade with China. The UNSC resolutions sanction mainly "demands North Korea refrain from further nuclear or missile tests and return to the NPT." Moreover, the sanctions resolutions try to ban North Korea's ability of exporting their natural resources such as coal and iron ore, and prohibit member states' exports to North Korea, actions which may contribute to North Korea's further nuclear and missile tests.
- The UN Security Council tries to urge North Korea for denuclearization, a measure that has proven to be ineffective in preventing further nuclear and missile tests.
- Meanwhile, the most severe sanction of the UNSC is found to be a ban on crude oil exports to North Korea, but such sanction has not been executed yet. The first step for such sanctions to proceed is the achievement of a consensus between member states and international society.

== List ==
Related to the Korean War
Related to UN membership
Related to non-proliferation

Resolution	Content	Date	Ref(s)
S/RES/82	Determined that North Korea's invasion of South Korea in the Korean War constituted a "breach of the peace" and demanded immediate cessation of hostilities. Ratified by nine votes with Yugoslavia abstaining and the Soviet Union absent.	25 June 1950	
S/RES/83	Recommended UN member states to provide assistance to South Korea in the Korean War to repel the attack by North Korea and restore international peace and security. North Korea did not comply with UNSC Resolution 82. The Security Council required North Korea to withdraw its armed forces at the 38th parallel. Ratified by seven votes with Yugoslavia voting against, Egypt and India abstaining, and the Soviet Union absent.	27 June 1950	
S/RES/84	Established a unified command led by the United States to coordinate the war effort of allies of South Korea in the Korean War. North Korea's invasion of the Republic of Korea was a threat to international security and peace. Ratified by seven votes with Egypt, India, and Yugoslavia abstaining and the Soviet Union absent.	7 July 1950	
S/RES/85	Coordinated relief for victims of the Korean War. Held that North Korea's invasion of South Korea in the war constituted an "unlawful attack". Adopted by nine votes with Yugoslavia abstaining and the Soviet Union absent.	31 July 1950	
S/RES/90	Unanimously removed the Korean War from the agenda of the Security Council.	31 January 1951	
S/RES/702	Recommended both North Korea and South Korea for UN membership.	8 August 1991	
S/RES/825	Urged North Korea to reconsider its withdrawal from the Nuclear Non-Proliferation Treaty (NPT) and abide by its international obligations. Adopted by 13 votes with China and Pakistan abstaining.	11 May 1993	
S/RES/1695	Condemned North Korea's 2006 launch of ballistic missiles and imposed sanctions against North Korea. Unanimously adopted.	15 July 2006	
S/RES/1718	Expressed concern over North Korea's 2006 nuclear test, imposed sanctions and set up the UN Security Council Sanctions Committee on North Korea. A Panel of Experts was established to support the Committee. Unanimously adopted.	14 October 2006	
S/RES/1874	Expressed concern over North Korea's 2009 nuclear test. Extended sanctions to concern all arms material and related financial transactions, technical training, advice, services or assistance, manufacture and maintenance. Unanimously adopted.	12 June 2009	
S/RES/1887	Called for implementing the UNSC Resolution 1540 for nuclear nonproliferation and disarmament. Unanimously adopted.	24 September 2009	
S/RES/1928	Extended the mandate of the Panel of Experts until 12 June 2011. Unanimously adopted.	7 June 2010	
S/RES/1985	Extended the mandate of the Panel of Experts until 12 June 2012 and asked it to submit its midterm and final reports to the Sanctions Committee for discussion one month before they are submitted to the Security Council. Unanimously adopted.	10 June 2011	
S/RES/2050	Extended the mandate of the Panel of Experts until 12 June 2013. Unanimously adopted.	12 June 2012	
S/RES/2087	Condemned North Korea's 2012 satellite launch and added to sanctions. Unanimously adopted.	22 January 2013	
S/RES/2094	Imposed sanctions after North Korea's 2013 nuclear test. Enforcing sanctions on North Korea to condemn the third nuclear test. Unanimously adopted.	7 March 2013	
S/RES/2141	Extended the mandate of the Panel of Experts until 5 April 2015.	5 March 2014	
S/RES/2207	Extended the mandate of the Panel of Experts until 5 April 2016. Unanimously adopted.	4 March 2015	
S/RES/2270	Imposed sanctions after North Korea's 2016 nuclear and missile test. Sanctions include inspection of all passing cargo to and from North Korea, prohibition of all weapons trade with the country, additional restrictions on North Korean imports of luxury goods, and expulsion of certain North Korean diplomats suspected of illicit activities. Unanimously adopted.	2 March 2016	
S/RES/2276	Extends the mandate of the Panel of Experts assisting the DPRK Sanctions Committee established in UNSC Res 1718.	24 March 2016	
S/RES/2321	The UNSC unanimously strengthened its sanctions regime against the DPRK, in response to that country's 9 September nuclear test.	30 November 2016	
S/RES/2345	The UNSC extended the mandate of the Panel of Experts into 2018.	23 March 2017	
S/RES/2356	The UNSC unanimously sanctioned a list of individuals and entities designated as being engaged in or providing support for Pyongyang's nuclear-related program.	2 June 2017	
S/RES/2371	The UNSC unanimously strengthened its sanctions regime against the DPRK, in response to that country's 28 July 2017 missile test. Unanimously adopted.	5 August 2017	
S/RES/2375	The UNSC unanimously strengthened its oil sanctions regime against the DPRK, in response to that country's sixth nuclear test. 'At the current annual level of 4 million barrels and limits exports of refined petroleum products to the country to 2 million barrels annually. They together slash North Korea's oil supplies from outside by 30 percent. It also bans overseas sales of North Korean textiles and further restricts the country's exports of its workers.' Unanimously adopted.	11 September 2017	
S/RES/2397	The UNSC unanimously strengthened sanctions in response to the launch of Hwasong-15 intercontinental ballistic missile. Unanimously adopted.	22 December 2017	
S/RES/2407	Extends the mandate of S/RES/1718 until 24 April 2019 and further enforcement of prior resolutions.	21 March 2018	

== See also ==
- Korean War
- Breach of the peace
- Use of force in international law
- United Nations Command
- Chapter VII of the United Nations Charter
- North Korea and weapons of mass destruction
- Foreign relations of North Korea
- United Nations and North Korea
- Korea and the United Nations
- China–North Korea relations
- United Nations General Assembly resolutions – including those related to the Korean War
- United Nations General Assembly Resolution 62/167
- United Nations Security Council Resolution 88 – concerning the Republic of China during the Korean War
- Report of the Commission of Inquiry on Human Rights in the Democratic People's Republic of Korea
- Human rights in North Korea
