= United Nations Security Council Resolution 92 =

United Nations Security Council resolution

UN Security Council Resolution 92
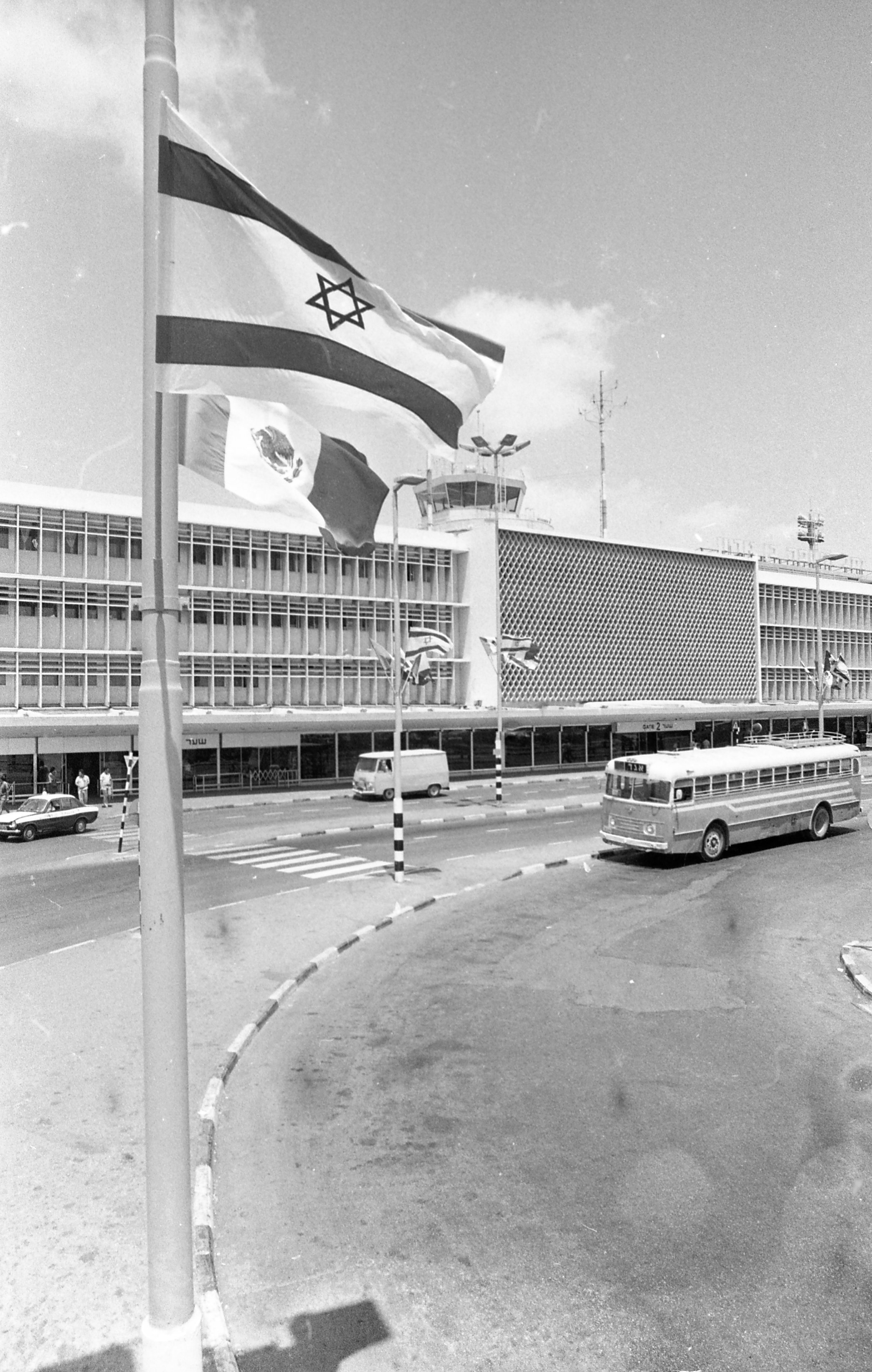
- Israel flag
- Date: May 8 1951
- Meeting no.: 545
- Code: S/2130 (Document)
- Subject: The Palestine Question
- Voting summary: 10 voted for; None voted against; 1 abstained
- Result: Adopted

Security Council composition
- Permanent members: China; France; Soviet Union; United Kingdom; United States
- Non-permanent members: Brazil; Ecuador; India; Netherlands; Turkey; Yugoslavia

United Nations Security Council Resolution 92, adopted on May 8, 1951, recalling its previous resolutions demanding a cease-fire in the Arab-Israeli conflict the Council noted with concern that fighting had broken out in and around the demilitarized zone established by the Israel-Syrian General Armistice Agreement of 20 July 1949 and that fighting was continuing despite the cease-fire order of the Acting Chief of Staff of the United Nations Truce Supervision Organization in Palestine. The Council called upon the parties of persons in the areas concerned to cease fighting and called them to comply with their obligations and commitments to previous resolutions and Agreements.

The resolution passed with ten votes; the Soviet Union abstained.

== See also ==
- List of United Nations Security Council Resolutions 1 to 100 (1946–1953)
- United Nations Security Council Resolution 54
- United Nations Security Council Resolution 73
- United Nations Security Council Resolution 89
