= United Nations Security Council Resolution 87 =

UN Security Council Resolution 87
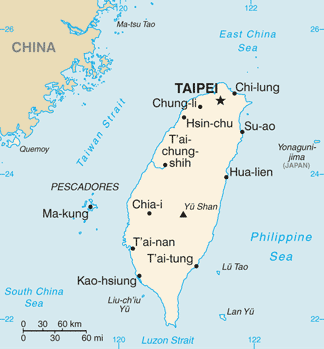
- Taiwan, with mainland China coast visible
- Date: September 29 1950
- Meeting no.: 506
- Code: S/1836 (Document)
- Subject: Invitation to representatives of PRC and Taiwan regarding armed invasion of Taiwan
- Voting summary: 7 voted for; 3 voted against; 1 abstained
- Result: Adopted

Security Council composition
- Permanent members: China; France; Soviet Union; United Kingdom; United States
- Non-permanent members: Cuba; Ecuador; Egypt; India; Norway; Yugoslavia

United Nations Security Council Resolution 87, adopted on 29 September 1950, considering that its duty is to investigate any situation likely to lead to international friction, the Council decided that it would respond to declarations by the People's Republic of China regarding an armed invasion of the island of Taiwan after 15 October 1950 when representatives from both the PRC and the ROC would be present.

The resolution was adopted by 7 votes, with the Republic of China, Cuba and the United States voting against and one abstention from Egypt.

== See also ==
- List of United Nations Security Council Resolutions 1 to 100 (1946–1953)
- United Nations Security Council resolutions concerning China
