= United Nations Security Council Resolution 85 =

UN Security Council Resolution

UN Security Council Resolution 85
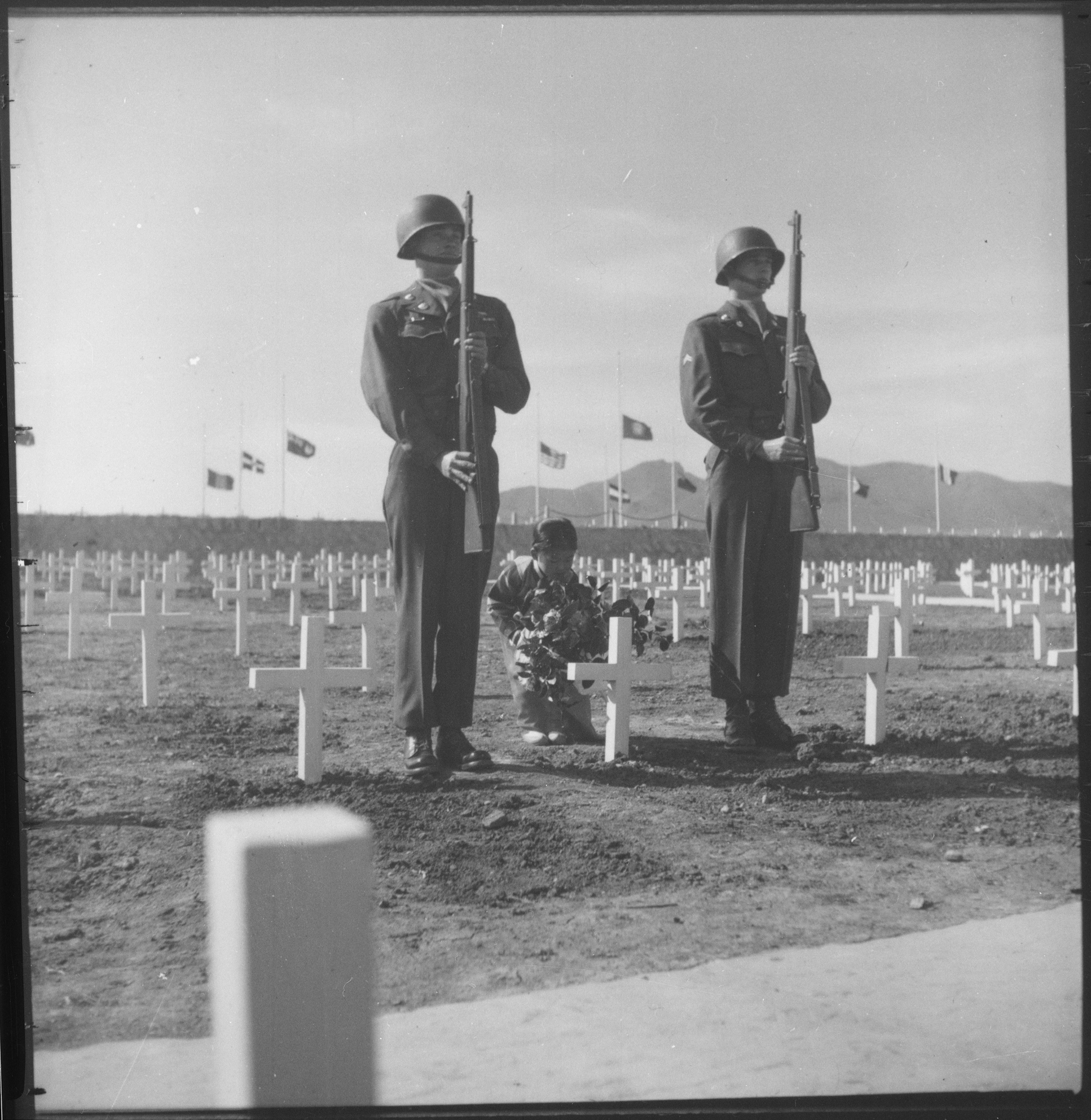
- United Nations Memorial Cemetery, Pusan, South Korea
- Date: July 31 1950
- Meeting no.: 479
- Code: S/1657 (Document)
- Subject: Complaint of aggression upon the Republic of Korea
- Voting summary: 9 voted for; None voted against; 1 abstained; 1 absent
- Result: Adopted

Security Council composition
- Permanent members: China; France; Soviet Union; United Kingdom; United States
- Non-permanent members: Cuba; Ecuador; Egypt; India; Norway; Yugoslavia

The United Nations Security Council Resolution 85, adopted on 31 July 1950 by the United Nations Security Council (UNSC), authorized the United Nations Command (UNC) to support the Korean civilian population, and requested that specialized agencies, appropriate subsidiary bodies of the United Nations, and appropriate non-governmental organizations support the UN Command in doing so. It was adopted at the 479th meeting after UNSC Resolution 84 was passed creating the unified command.

The selection of a commander of the unified command was left to the President of the United States, who delegated the decision to the Joint Chiefs of Staff, who chose Douglas A. MacArthur as the first person to hold the position of the nascent administration.

The resolution was adopted with nine votes; Yugoslavia abstained. The Soviet Union was absent when voting took place, as they were boycotting the UN in protest of its non-recognition of the newly formed People's Republic of China by the United Nations. It was the final resolution adopted before the end of the Soviet boycott.

== See also ==
- Korean War
- United Nations Command
- Use of force in international law
- Chapter VII of the United Nations Charter
- United Nations Security Council Resolution 90
- List of United Nations Security Council Resolutions 1 to 100 (1946–1953)
