= List of UN resolutions concerning Israel and Palestine =

List of UN resolutions concerning Israel and Palestine may refer to:

- List of United Nations resolutions concerning Israel
- List of United Nations resolutions concerning Palestine
