= United Nations Security Council Resolution 79 =

UN Security Council Resolution 79
- Date: January 17 1950
- Meeting no.: 462
- Code: S/1455 (Document)
- Subject: Armaments: regulation and reduction
- Voting summary: 9 voted for; None voted against; None abstained; 1 absent; 1 present not voting
- Result: Adopted

Security Council composition
- Permanent members: China; France; Soviet Union; United Kingdom; United States
- Non-permanent members: Cuba; Ecuador; Egypt; India; Norway; Yugoslavia

United Nations Security Council Resolution 79, adopted on January 17, 1950, having received and the text of United Nations General Assembly Resolution 300 concerning the regulation and general reduction of conventional armaments and armed forces, the Council decided to transmit the resolution to the Commission for Conventional Armaments for further study in accordance with the Commission’s plan of work.

The resolution was adopted with nine votes. Yugoslavia was present but did not vote, and the Soviet Union was absent. This was the first resolution adopted during the Soviet boycott of the UN.

== See also ==
- List of United Nations Security Council Resolutions 1 to 100 (1946–1953)
