= United Nations Security Council Resolution 94 =

UN Security Council Resolution 94
- Date: 29 May 1951
- Meeting no.: 548
- Code: S/2174 (Document)
- Subject: The International Court of Justice
- Voting summary: 11 voted for; None voted against; None abstained
- Result: Adopted

Security Council composition
- Permanent members: China; France; Soviet Union; United Kingdom; United States
- Non-permanent members: Brazil; Ecuador; India; Netherlands; Turkey; Yugoslavia

United Nations Security Council Resolution 94 was adopted on 29 May 1951. In the resolution, the Security Council noted with regret the death of International Court of Justice Judge José Philadelpho de Barros e Azevedo on 7 May 1951 and decided that the election to fill the vacancy would take place during the sixth session of the General Assembly. The Council further decided that this election should take place prior to the regular election which was to be held at the same session to fill the five vacancies which were to occur owing to the expiration on 5 February 1952 of the mandates of five of the ICJ's members.

The resolution was adopted unanimously.

On 6 December 1951, Levi Fernandes Carneiro of Brazil was elected to fill the vacancy.

== See also ==
- List of United Nations Security Council Resolutions 1 to 100 (1946–1953)
