= United Nations Security Council Resolution 81 =

UN Security Council Resolution 81
- Date: March 24 1950
- Meeting no.: 472
- Code: S/1486 (Document)
- Subject: Procedure
- Voting summary: 10 voted for; None voted against; None abstained; 1 absent
- Result: Adopted

Security Council composition
- Permanent members: China; France; Soviet Union; United Kingdom; United States
- Non-permanent members: Cuba; Ecuador; Egypt; India; Norway; Yugoslavia

United Nations Security Council Resolution 81, adopted on March 24, 1950, having a communication from the Secretary General the Council took note of General Assembly Resolution 268 and decided to base its action upon the principles contained therein, should an appropriate occasion arise.

The resolution was adopted with 10 votes; the Soviet Union was absent when voting took place.

== See also ==
- List of United Nations Security Council Resolutions 1 to 100 (1946–1953)
