= United Nations Security Council Resolution 93 =

UN Security Council Resolution 93
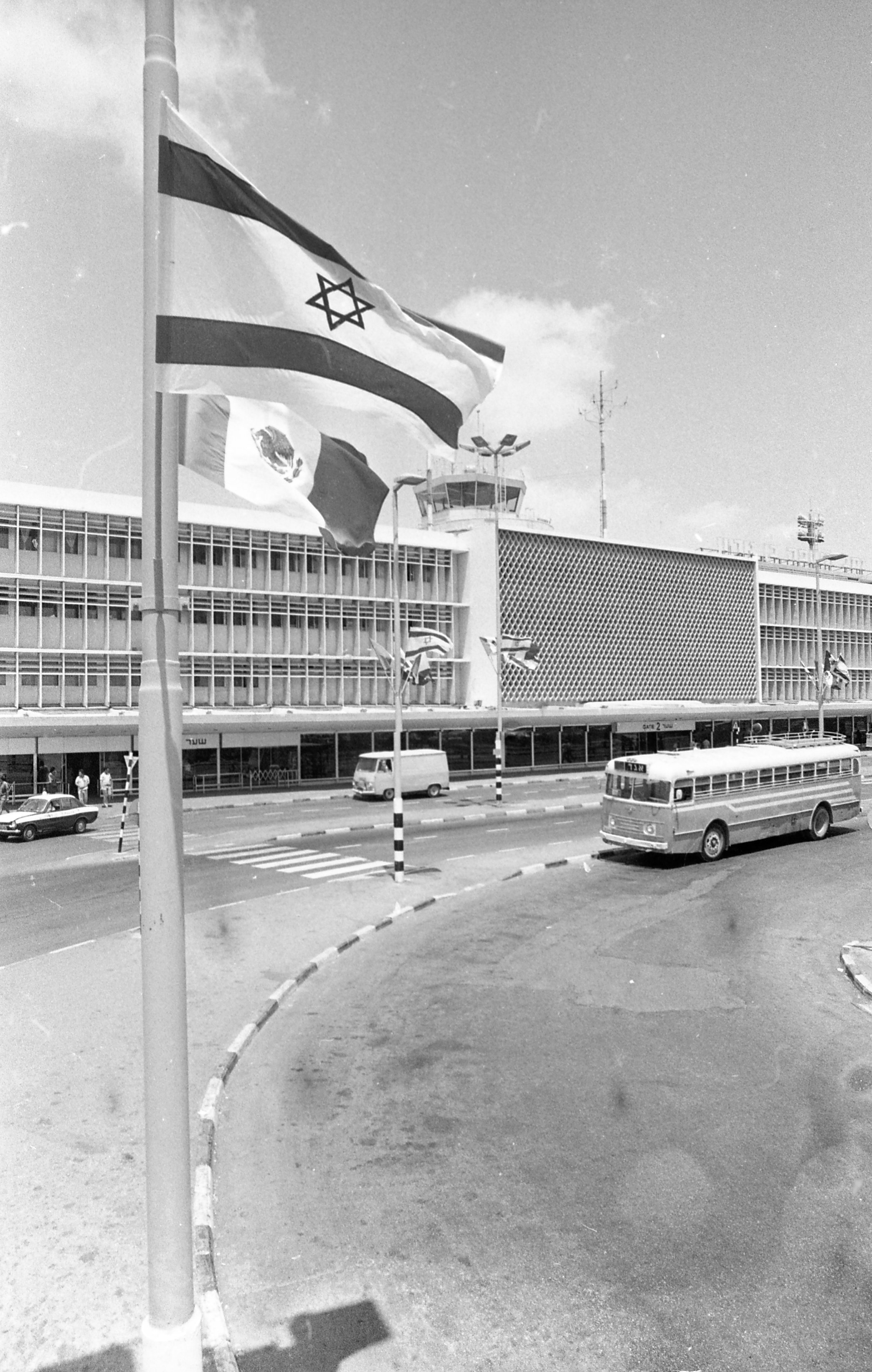
- Israel flag
- Date: 18 May 1951
- Meeting no.: 547
- Code: S/2157 (Document)
- Subject: The Palestine Question
- Voting summary: 10 voted for; None voted against; 1 abstained
- Result: Adopted

Security Council composition
- Permanent members: China; France; Soviet Union; United Kingdom; United States
- Non-permanent members: Brazil; Ecuador; India; Netherlands; Turkey; Yugoslavia

United Nations Security Council Resolution 93, adopted on May 18, 1951, after hearing a report from the Chief of Staff of the United Nations Truce Supervision Organization in Palestine, the representatives of Syria and Israel as well as a determination by the Israel–Syria Mixed Armistice Commission found that the "Aerial action taken by the forces of the Government of Israel on 5 April 1951, and Any aggressive military action by either of the parties in or around the demilitarized zone... constitute a violation of the cease-fire provision in Security Council resolution 54 (1948) and are inconsistent with the terms of the Armistice Agreement and the obligations assumed under the Charter".

The resolution was adopted with ten votes; the Soviet Union abstained.

== See also ==
- List of United Nations Security Council Resolutions 1 to 100 (1946–1953)
