= United Nations Security Council Resolution 75 =

UN Security Council Resolution 75
- Date: 27 September 1949
- Meeting no.: 448
- Code: S/1401 (Document)
- Subject: Travelling expenses and subsistence allowances of alternate representatives on certain Security Council commissions
- Voting summary: 7 voted for; 1 voted against; 3 abstained
- Result: Adopted

Security Council composition
- Permanent members: China; France; Soviet Union; United Kingdom; United States
- Non-permanent members: Argentina; Canada; Cuba; Egypt; Norway; Ukrainian SSR

United Nations Security Council Resolution 75 was adopted on 27 September 1949. After receiving a General Assembly resolution authorizing the Security Council to make decisions on the matter, the Council decided to retroactively reimburse the Member States that were participating in the United Nations Commission for Indonesia and the United Nations Commission for India and Pakistan for their travelling and subsistence expenses.

The resolution passed with a total of seven votes, while the Ukrainian SSR voted against it and Cuba, Egypt and the Soviet Union abstained.

== See also ==
- List of United Nations Security Council Resolutions 1 to 100 (1946–1953)
