= United Nations Security Council Resolution 74 =

UN Security Council Resolution 74
- Date: 16 September 1949
- Meeting no.: 447
- Code: S/1393 (Document)
- Subject: Atomic energy: international control
- Voting summary: 9 voted for; None voted against; 2 abstained
- Result: Adopted

Security Council composition
- Permanent members: China; France; Soviet Union; United Kingdom; United States
- Non-permanent members: Argentina; Canada; Cuba; Egypt; Norway; Ukrainian SSR

United Nations Security Council Resolution 74 was adopted on 16 September 1949. Having received and examined a letter from the Chairman of the Atomic Energy Commission (AEC) transmitting two resolutions, the Security Council directed the Secretary-General to transmit this letter and the accompanying resolutions, along with records of the discussion of the issue within the AEC, to the General Assembly and the Member States.

The resolution passed by nine votes in favour, with abstentions from the Ukrainian SSR and Soviet Union.

== See also ==
- List of United Nations Security Council Resolutions 1 to 100 (1946–1953)
