= United Nations Security Council Resolution 37 =

United Nations Security Council resolution

UN Security Council Resolution 37
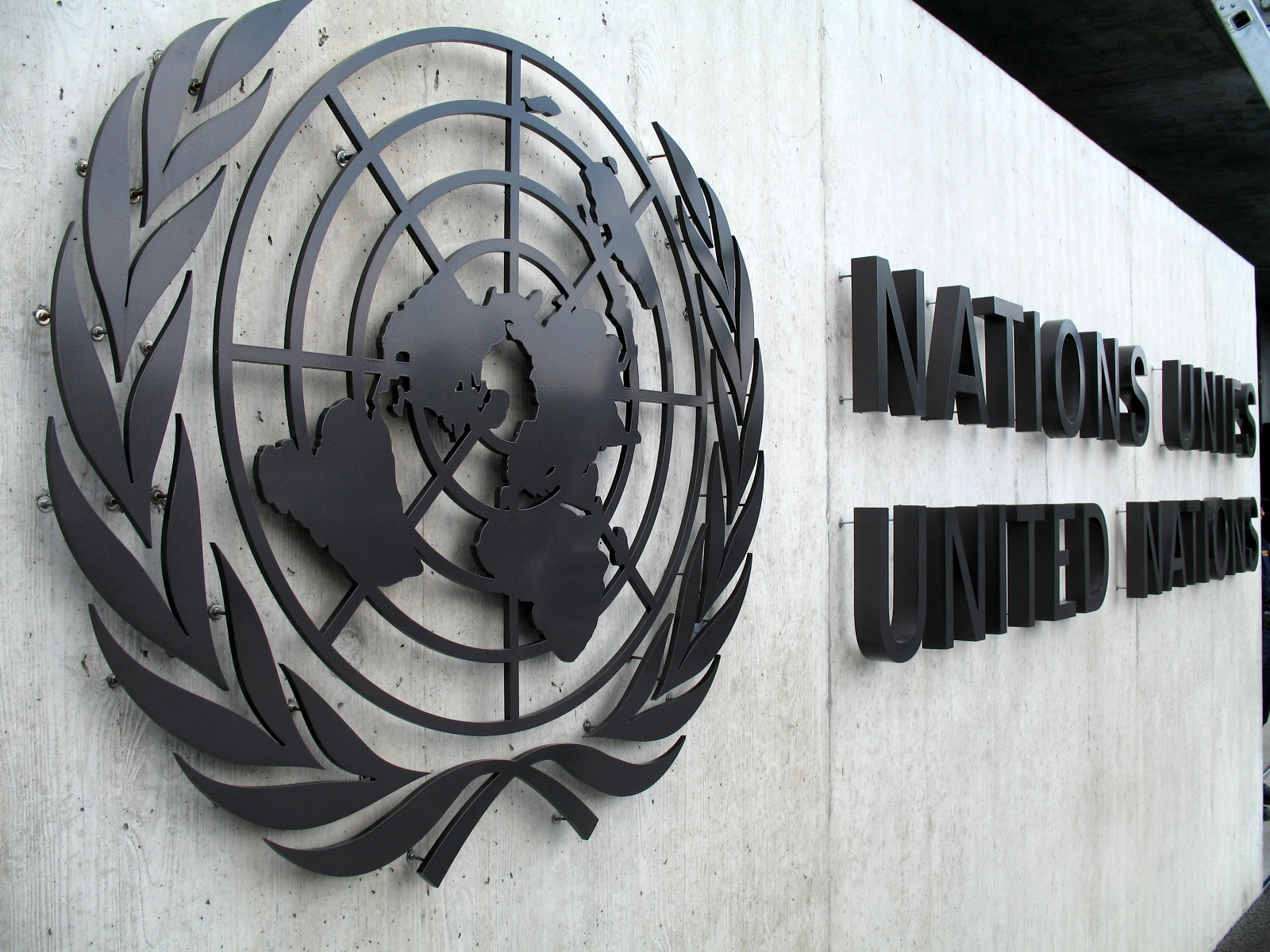
- UN emblem
- Date: December 9 1947
- Meeting no.: 222
- Subject: Procedure
- Result: Adopted

Security Council composition
- Permanent members: China; France; Soviet Union; United Kingdom; United States
- Non-permanent members: Australia; Belgium; Brazil; Colombia; Poland; Syria

United Nations Security Council Resolution 37, adopted on 9 December 1947, amended the Council's rules concerning the admission of new member states.

== See also ==
- List of United Nations Security Council Resolutions 1 to 100 (1946–1953)
