= United Nations Security Council Resolution 70 =

UN Security Council Resolution 70
- Date: March 7 1949
- Meeting no.: 415
- Code: S/1280 (Document)
- Subject: Trusteeship of strategic areas
- Voting summary: 8 voted for; None voted against; 3 abstained
- Result: Adopted

Security Council composition
- Permanent members: China; France; Soviet Union; United Kingdom; United States
- Non-permanent members: Argentina; Canada; Cuba; Egypt; Norway; Ukrainian SSR

United Nations Security Council Resolution 70, adopted on March 7, 1949, requested that the Secretary-General inform the Council of all reports and petitions received from or relating to strategic areas under trusteeship and requested that the Trusteeship Council submit to the Council its reports and recommendations for political, economic, social and educational matters affecting strategic areas under trusteeship.

The resolution was approved with eight votes to none, with Egypt, the Ukrainian SSR and Soviet Union abstaining.

== See also ==
- List of United Nations Security Council Resolutions 1 to 100 (1946–1953)
