= United Nations Security Council Resolution 58 =

UN Security Council Resolution 58
- Date: September 28 1948
- Meeting no.: 360
- Subject: International Court of Justice
- Result: Adopted

Security Council composition
- Permanent members: China; France; Soviet Union; United Kingdom; United States
- Non-permanent members: Argentina; Belgium; Canada; Colombia; Syria; Ukrainian SSR

United Nations Security Council Resolution 58 was adopted on September 28, 1948. The Swiss Confederation had just joined the International Court of Justice (ICJ) but was not yet a member of the United Nations and the council was asked to make recommendations. The Council recommended that Switzerland and any other state that should find itself in this position be allowed to participate in all the elements of the General Assembly pertaining to the ICJ including the nomination of new members, elections, etc.

The council also recommended that those nations would be required to pay dues contributing to the expenses of the Court and that should it fail to do so (unless that nation possessed an excuse deemed worthy by the General Assembly) it should not be allowed to participate in the Assembly in any way until the balance was paid.

The President of the Council stated that the resolution was adopted unanimously in the absence of any objection by any of its members.

== See also ==
- List of United Nations Security Council Resolutions 1 to 100 (1946–1953)
