= United Nations Security Council Resolution 71 =

UN Security Council Resolution 71
- Date: 27 July 1949
- Meeting no.: 432
- Subject: International Court of Justice
- Voting summary: 9 voted for; None voted against; 2 abstained
- Result: Adopted

Security Council composition
- Permanent members: China; France; Soviet Union; United Kingdom; United States
- Non-permanent members: Argentina; Canada; Cuba; Egypt; Norway; Ukrainian SSR

United Nations Security Council Resolution 71 was adopted on 27 July 1949. Asked by the General Assembly under what conditions Liechtenstein might become a party to the Statute of the International Court of Justice, the Council determined that should Liechtenstein accept the provisions of the Statute, accept all the obligations of a member of the United Nations under Article 94 of the Charter, undertake to contribute to the expenses of the Court and ratify the Statute, Liechtenstein would become a party to the Statute of the International Court of Justice.

The resolution was adopted with nine votes to none; the Ukrainian SSR and Soviet Union abstained from the vote.

== See also ==
- List of United Nations Security Council Resolutions 1 to 100 (1946–1953)
