= United Nations Security Council Resolution 88 =

UN Security Council Resolution 88
- Date: 8 November 1950
- Meeting no.: 520
- Code: S/1892 (Document)
- Subject: Complaint of aggression upon the Republic of Korea
- Voting summary: 8 voted for; 2 voted against; 1 abstained
- Result: Adopted

Security Council composition
- Permanent members: China; France; Soviet Union; United Kingdom; United States
- Non-permanent members: Cuba; Ecuador; Egypt; India; Norway; Yugoslavia

United Nations Security Council Resolution 88 was adopted on November 8, 1950, in accordance with rule 39 of the provisional rules of procedure. The Council invited a representative of the People's Republic of China to be present during the discussion by the Council of the special report of the United Nations Command in Korea.

The resolution was adopted by eight votes to two (Republic of China, Cuba) and one abstention from the Kingdom of Egypt.

== See also ==
- Korean War
- List of United Nations Security Council Resolutions 1 to 100 (1946–1953)
