= United Nations Security Council Resolution 99 =

UN Security Council Resolution 99
- Date: 12 August 1953
- Meeting no.: 618
- Subject: International Court of Justice
- Result: Adopted

Security Council composition
- Permanent members: China; France; Soviet Union; United Kingdom; United States
- Non-permanent members: Chile; Colombia; Denmark; Greece; Lebanon; Pakistan

United Nations Security Council Resolution 99 was adopted on 12 August 1953. Noting that International Court of Justice Judge Sergei Golunsky had submitted his resignation due to ill health and that a vacancy would exist on the Court, the Council resolved that an election to fill the vacancy would take place during the eighth session of the General Assembly.

The President of the Council announced that in the absence of any objection, the resolution was adopted unanimously.

Feodor Ivanovich Kozhevnikov of the USSR was elected to the vacancy on 27 November 1953.

== See also ==
- List of United Nations Security Council Resolutions 1 to 100 (1946–1953)
