= United Nations Security Council Resolution 76 =

United Nations Security Council resolution

UN Security Council Resolution 76
- Date: October 5 1949
- Meeting no.: 449
- Code: S/1404 (Document)
- Subject: Future costs of UN military observers in Indonesia
- Voting summary: 9 voted for; 1 voted against; 1 abstained
- Result: Adopted

Security Council composition
- Permanent members: China; France; Soviet Union; United Kingdom; United States
- Non-permanent members: Argentina; Canada; Cuba; Egypt; Norway; Ukrainian SSR

United Nations Security Council Resolution 76, adopted on October 5, 1949, after receiving a cablegram from the Consular Commission at Batavia to the President of the Security Council requesting that the United Nations assume future costs of military observers in Indonesia the Council transmitted the message to the Secretary-General.

The resolution was adopted by nine votes to one (Ukrainian SSR) and one abstention from the Soviet Union.

== See also ==
- List of United Nations Security Council Resolutions 1 to 100 (1946–1953)
