= United Nations Security Council Resolution 97 =

UN Security Council Resolution 97
- Date: January 30 1952
- Meeting no.: 571
- Code: S/2506 (Document)
- Subject: Armaments: regulation and reduction
- Result: Adopted

Security Council composition
- Permanent members: China; France; Soviet Union; United Kingdom; United States
- Non-permanent members: Brazil; Chile; Greece; Netherlands; Pakistan; Turkey

United Nations Security Council Resolution 97, adopted on January 30, 1952, dissolved the Commission for Conventional Armaments.

No details of the vote were given.

== See also ==
- List of United Nations Security Council Resolutions 1 to 100 (1946–1953)
