= United Nations Security Council Resolution 33 =

United Nations Security Council resolution

UN Security Council Resolution 33
- Date: August 27 1947
- Meeting no.: 197
- Code: S/528 (Document)
- Subject: Procedure
- Voting summary: 10 voted for; None voted against; 1 abstained
- Result: Adopted

Security Council composition
- Permanent members: China; France; Soviet Union; United Kingdom; United States
- Non-permanent members: Australia; Belgium; Brazil; Colombia; Poland; Syria

United Nations Security Council Resolution 33 was adopted on 27 August 1947. It concerns changes to the provisional rules of procedure of the Security Council and the General Assembly. The Council accepted and rejected some of the changes recommended by the General Assembly.

Resolution 33 passed with ten votes to none. Australia abstained.

== See also ==
- List of United Nations Security Council Resolutions 1 to 100 (1946–1953)
