= United Nations Security Council Resolution 84 =

UN Security Council Resolution 84
- North Korea's advances in 1950
- Date: July 7, 1950
- Meeting no.: 476
- Code: S/1588 (Document)
- Subject: Complaint of aggression upon the Republic of Korea
- Voting summary: 7 voted for; None voted against; 3 abstained; 1 absent
- Result: Adopted

Security Council composition
- Permanent members: China; France; Soviet Union; United Kingdom; United States
- Non-permanent members: Cuba; Ecuador; Egypt; India; Norway; Yugoslavia

The United Nations Security Council Resolution 84, adopted on July 7, 1950, was the United Nations Security Council resolution which authorized the formation of the United Nations Command to provide military support for South Korea, following a North Korean invasion and offensive at the outbreak of the Korean War.

Having determined that the invasion of South Korea by forces from North Korea constituted a breach of the peace, the Council recommended that UN members assist South Korea in repelling the attack to restore peace and security to the area. The Council further recommended that all members providing military forces and other assistance to South Korea make them available under a unified command under the United States, and that the U.S. designate the commander of such forces and authorize said commander to use the flag of the United Nations at their discretion. Finally, the Council ordered the U.S. to provide it with reports as appropriate on the course of action taken by the unified command.

The resolution passed with the votes from the United Kingdom, the Republic of China, Cuba, Ecuador, France, Norway, and the United States. Egypt, India, and Yugoslavia abstained. The Soviet Union, a veto-wielding power, was absent, having been boycotting UN proceedings since January, in protest that the Republic of China and not the People's Republic of China held a permanent seat on the council. The Council President at the time was Norwegian Arne Sunde.

== See also ==
- Korean War
- Breach of the peace
- United Nations Command
- Use of force in international law
- Chapter VII of the United Nations Charter
- United Nations Security Council Resolution 85
- List of United Nations Security Council Resolutions 1 to 100 (1946–1953)
