= United Nations Security Council Resolution 62 =

UN Security Council Resolution 62
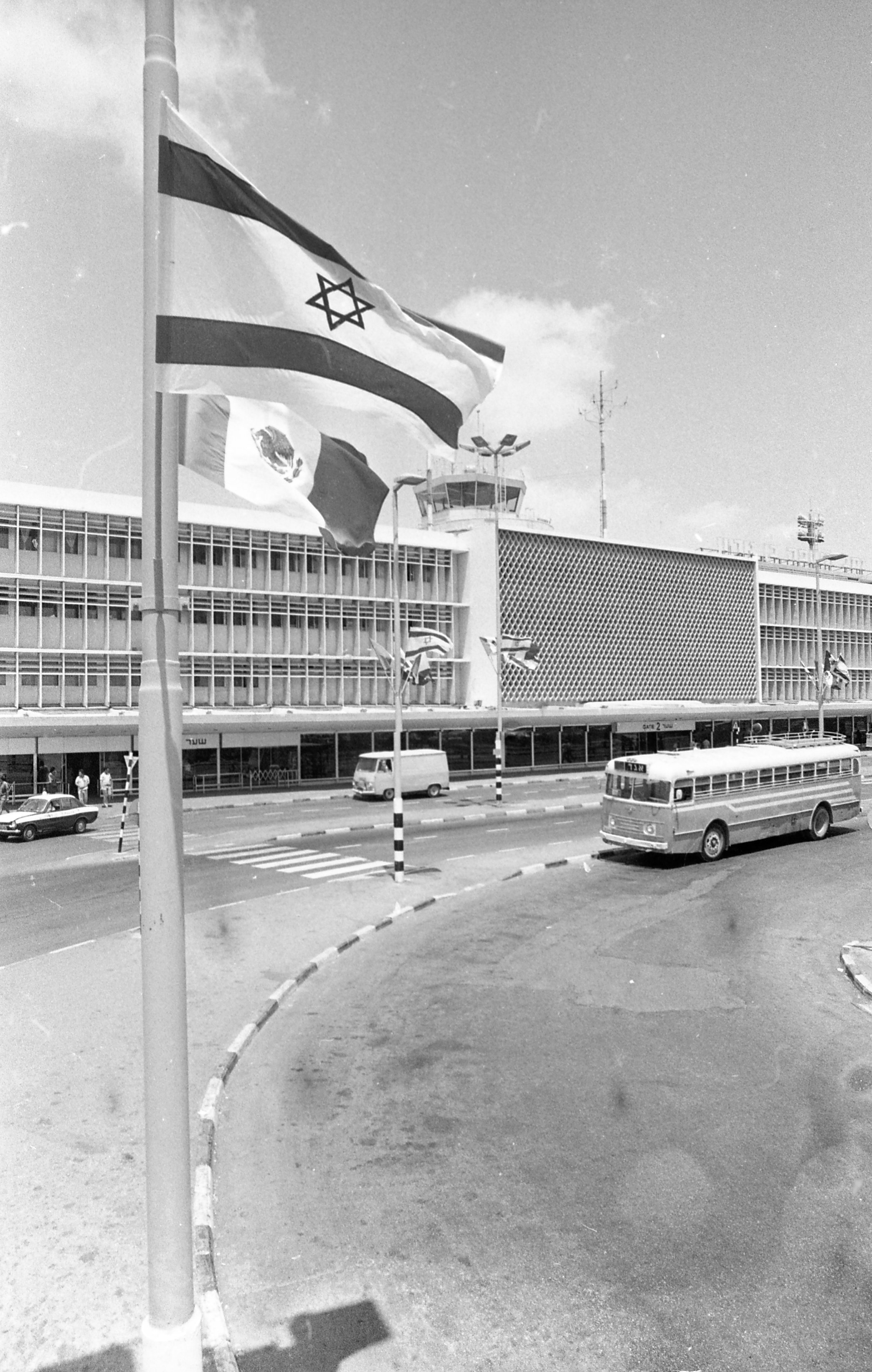
- Israel flag
- Date: November 16 1948
- Meeting no.: 381
- Code: S/1080 (Document)
- Subject: The Palestine Question
- Result: Adopted

Security Council composition
- Permanent members: China; France; Soviet Union; United Kingdom; United States
- Non-permanent members: Argentina; Belgium; Canada; Colombia; Syria; Ukrainian SSR

United Nations Security Council Resolution 62, adopted on November 16, 1948, called for an armistice in all sectors of Palestine, in order to facilitate the transition from the then-current truce (established by United Nations Security Council Resolution 54) to a permanent peace.

No vote was taken on the resolution as a whole as it was voted on in parts.

== See also ==
- List of United Nations Security Council Resolutions 1 to 100 (1946–1953)
