= United Nations Security Council Resolution 52 =

UN Security Council Resolution 52
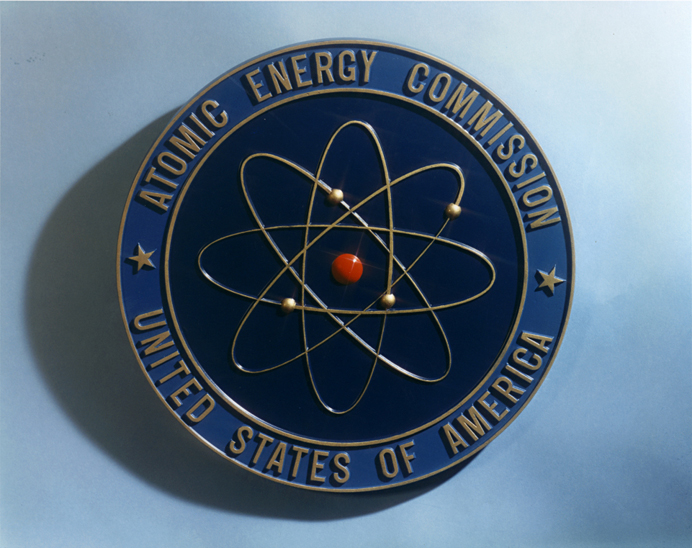
- US Atomic Energy Commission logo
- Date: June 22 1948
- Meeting no.: 325
- Code: S/852 (Document)
- Subject: Atomic Energy: International Control
- Voting summary: 9 voted for; None voted against; 2 abstained
- Result: Adopted

Security Council composition
- Permanent members: China; France; Soviet Union; United Kingdom; United States
- Non-permanent members: Argentina; Belgium; Canada; Colombia; Syria; Ukrainian SSR

United Nations Security Council Resolution 52, adopted on June 22, 1948, having received the first, second and third reports of the Atomic Energy Commission the Council directed the Secretary-General to transmit the second and third reports, along with a record of the Council deliberations on them, to the General Assembly and the Member States.

The resolution passed with nine votes to none; the Ukrainian SSR and Soviet Union abstained.

== See also ==
- List of United Nations Security Council Resolutions 1 to 100 (1946–1953)
