= United Nations Security Council Resolution 66 =

UN Security Council Resolution 66
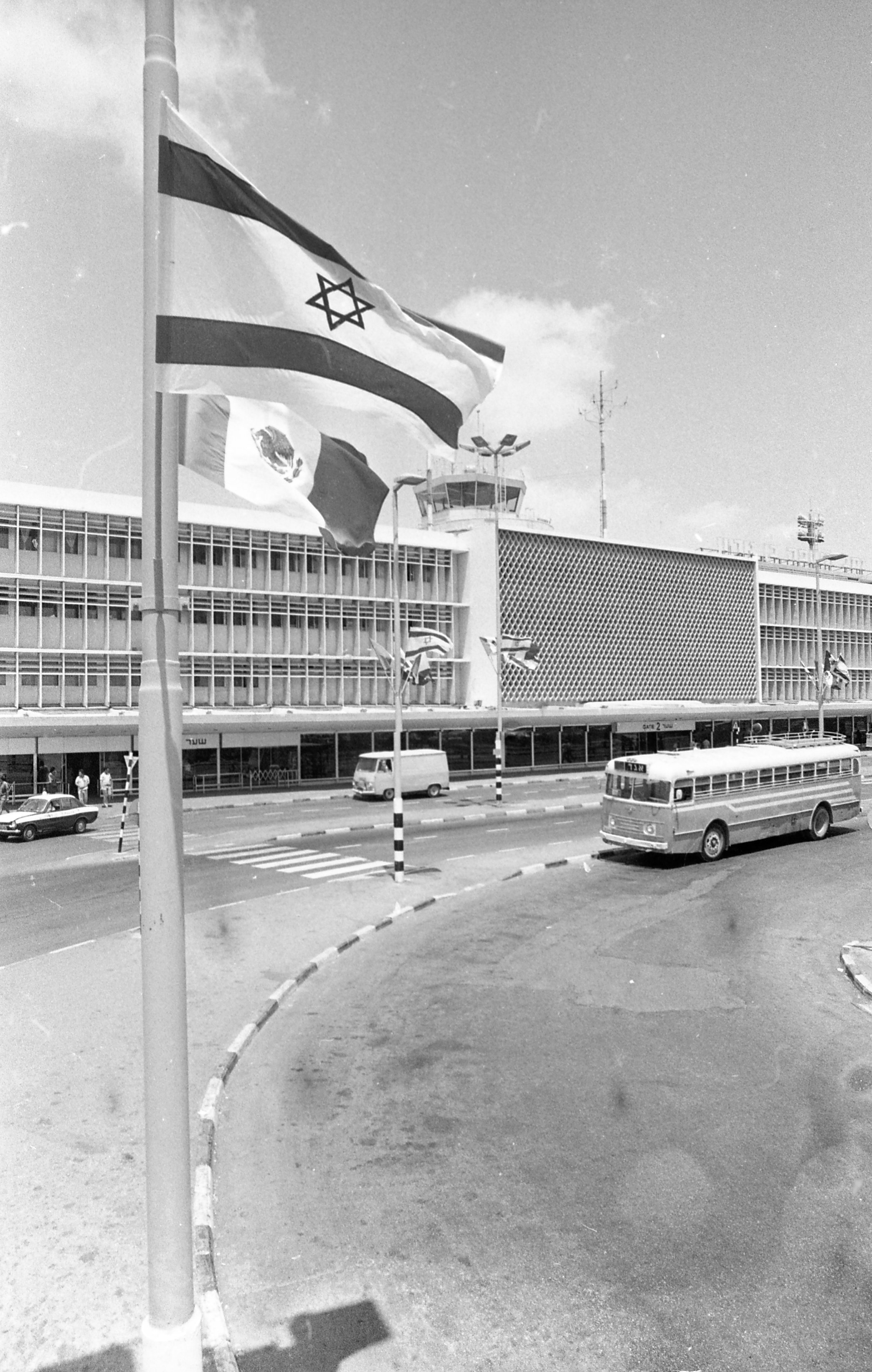
- Israel flag
- Date: December 29 1948
- Meeting no.: 396
- Code: S/1169 (Document)
- Subject: The Palestine Question
- Voting summary: 8 voted for; None voted against; 3 abstained
- Result: Adopted

Security Council composition
- Permanent members: China; France; Soviet Union; United Kingdom; United States
- Non-permanent members: Argentina; Belgium; Canada; Colombia; Syria; Ukrainian SSR

United Nations Security Council Resolution 66, adopted on December 29, 1948, in response to a report by the Acting Mediator regarding hostilities which broke out in southern Palestine on December 22 despite UN calls for a cease-fire, the Council demanded the immediate implementation of United Nations Security Council Resolution 61. The Resolution instructs the Acting Mediator to facilitate the complete supervision of the truce by the UN observers. The Resolution further instructs the committee appointed in UNSC Resolution 61 to meet at Lake Success, New York on January 7 to consider the situation in southern Palestine and to report to the Council on the extent to which governments have or have not complied with UNSC Resolutions 61 and 62. The Resolution also invited Cuba and Norway to replace the two retiring member of the committee (Belgium and Colombia) on January 1.

The resolution was adopted by eight votes to none; the Ukrainian Soviet Socialist Republic, United States and Soviet Union abstained.

== See also ==
- List of United Nations Security Council Resolutions 1 to 100 (1946–1953)
