= United Nations Security Council Resolution 44 =

United Nations Security Council resolution

UN Security Council Resolution 44
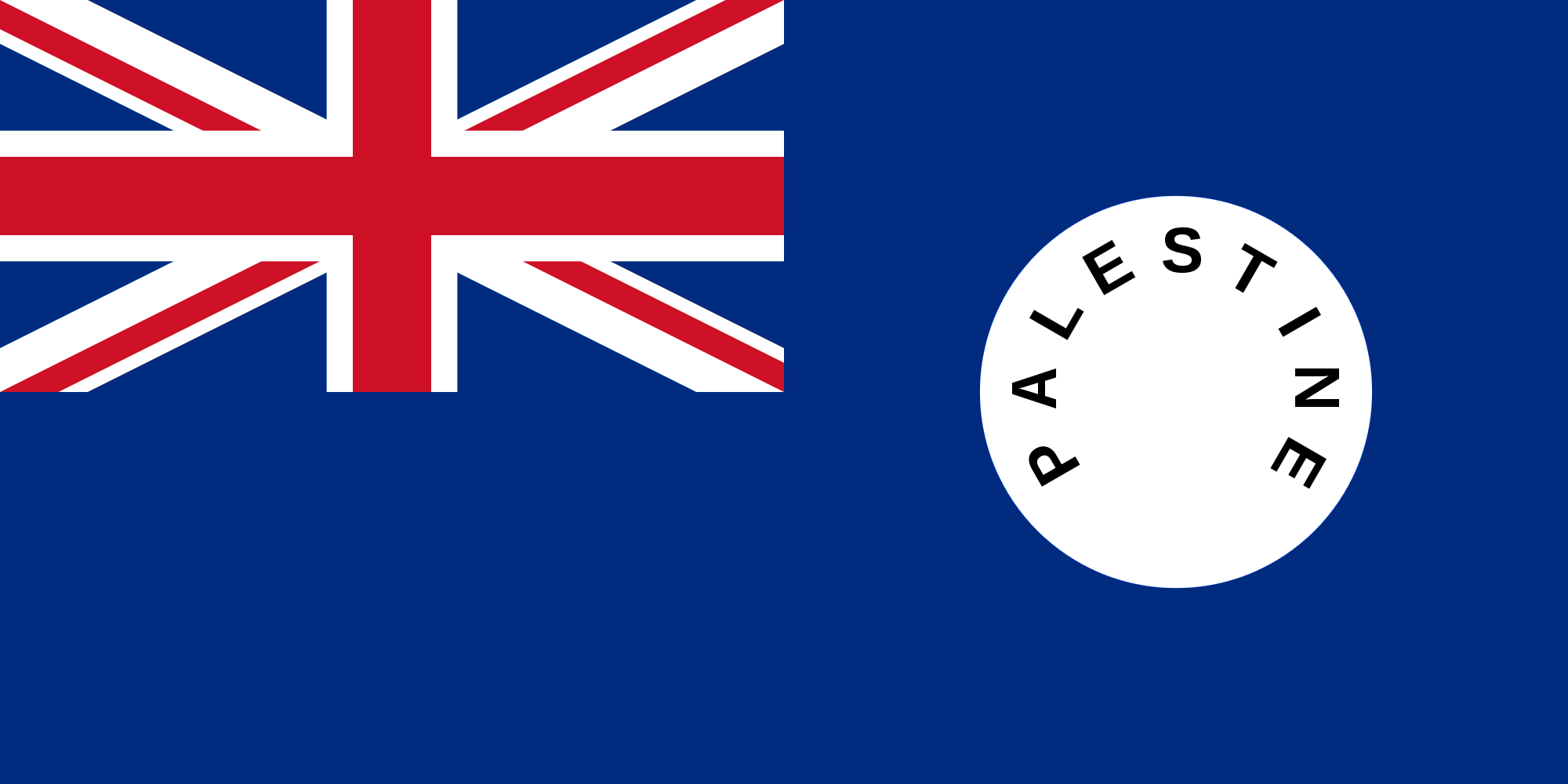
- Palestine flag
- Date: April 1 1948
- Meeting no.: 277
- Code: S/714, II (Document)
- Subject: The Palestine question
- Voting summary: 9 voted for; None voted against; 2 abstained
- Result: Adopted

Security Council composition
- Permanent members: China; France; Soviet Union; United Kingdom; United States
- Non-permanent members: Argentina; Belgium; Canada; Colombia; Syria; Ukrainian SSR

United Nations Security Council Resolution 44 was adopted on 1 April 1948. The Council, having received Resolution 181 (II) of the General Assembly and the reports requested in Resolution 42, called on the Secretary-General to convene a special session of the General Assembly to discuss the future government of Palestine, in accordance with Article 20 of the Charter of the United Nations.

Resolution 44 passed with nine votes to none. The Soviet Union and the Ukrainian SSR abstained.

== See also ==
- List of United Nations Security Council Resolutions 1 to 100 (1946–1953)
