= United Nations Security Council Resolution 26 =

United Nations Security Council resolution

UN Security Council Resolution 26
- Date: 4 June 1947
- Meeting no.: 138
- Code: S/368 (Document)
- Subject: Provisional rules of procedure of the Security Council
- Voting summary: 11 voted for; None voted against; None abstained
- Result: Adopted

Security Council composition
- Permanent members: China; France; Soviet Union; United Kingdom; United States
- Non-permanent members: Australia; Belgium; Brazil; Colombia; Poland; Syria

United Nations Security Council Resolution 26 was adopted unanimously on 4 June 1947. The Council resolved that any voting to fill positions on the International Court of Justice would continue until the candidates received an absolute majority of the votes.
