= United Nations Security Council Resolution 53 =

UN Security Council Resolution 53
- Date: July 7 1948
- Meeting no.: 331
- Code: S/875 (Document)
- Subject: The Palestine Question
- Voting summary: 8 voted for; None voted against; 3 abstained
- Result: Adopted

Security Council composition
- Permanent members: China; France; Soviet Union; United Kingdom; United States
- Non-permanent members: Argentina; Belgium; Canada; Colombia; Syria; Ukrainian SSR

United Nations Security Council Resolution 53, adopted on 7 July 1948, took into consideration a telegram from the United Nations Mediator, Folke Bernadotte, in Palestine dated 5 July 1948. The resolution "addresses an urgent appeal to the interested parties to accept in principle the prolongation of the truce for such period as may be decided upon in consultation with the Mediator."

The telegram in question (S/865) detailed the mediation and effect of a truce in Palestine, which was set to expire on 9 July 1948, and asserted the need for both parties to agree in principle to prolong the duration of the agreement.

The resolution was approved with eight votes, while the Ukrainian SSR, Soviet Union and Syria abstained.

== See also ==
- List of United Nations Security Council Resolutions 1 to 100 (1946–1953)
