= United Nations Security Council Resolution 60 =

UN Security Council Resolution 60
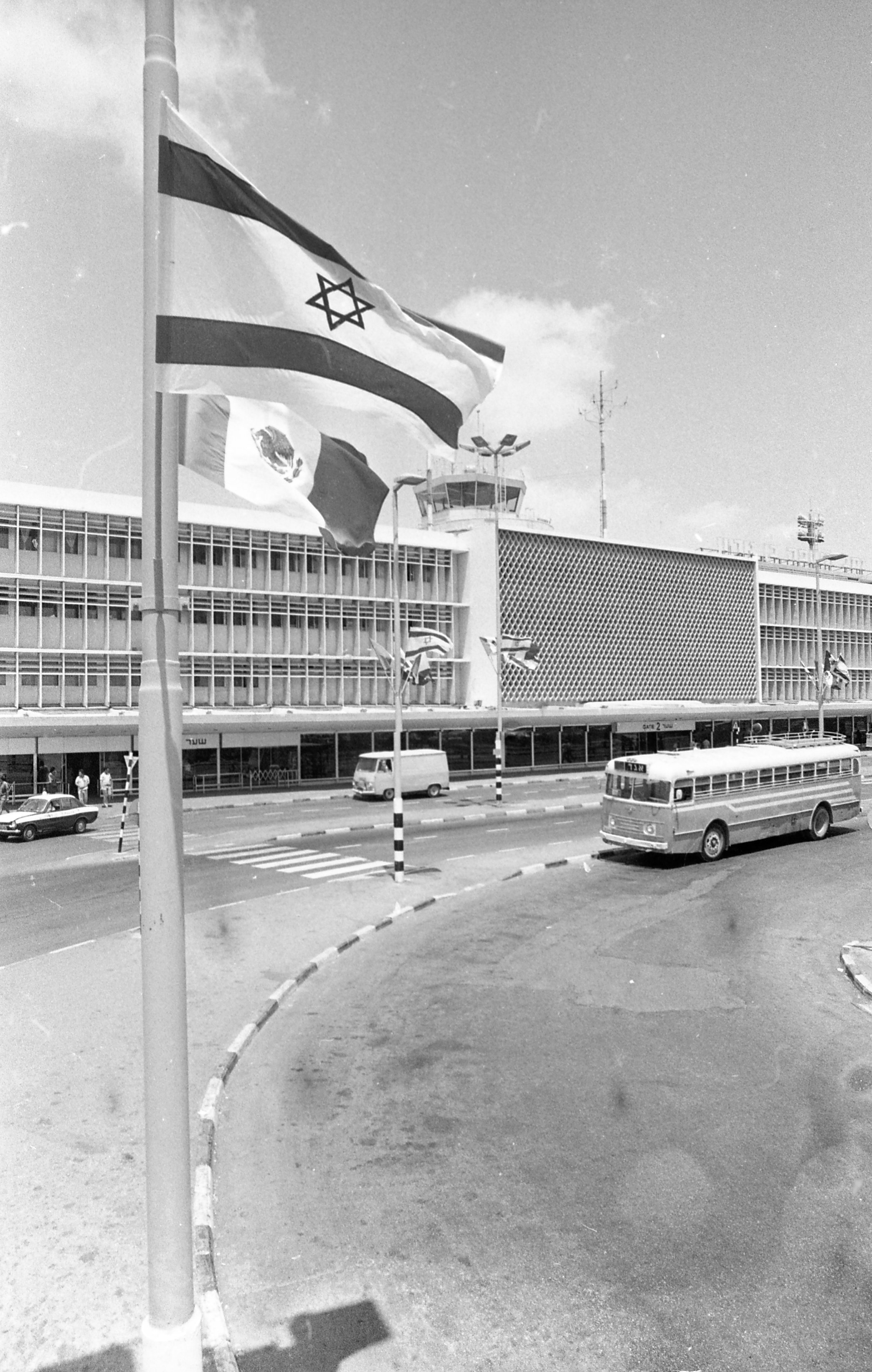
- Israel flag
- Date: October 29 1948
- Meeting no.: 375
- Code: S/1062 (Document)
- Subject: The Palestine Question
- Result: Adopted

Security Council composition
- Permanent members: China; France; Soviet Union; United Kingdom; United States
- Non-permanent members: Argentina; Belgium; Canada; Colombia; Syria; Ukrainian SSR

United Nations Security Council Resolution 60, adopted on October 29, 1948, resolved that a sub-committee be established consisting of the United Kingdom, Republic of China, France, Belgium and the Ukrainian Soviet Socialist Republic to consider all the amendments and revision which had been suggested to the second revised draft resolution contained in document S/1059/Rev.2 and prepare a revised draft resolution on behalf of the Council.

The resolution was adopted without vote.

== See also ==
- List of United Nations Security Council Resolutions 1 to 100 (1946–1953)
