= United Nations Security Council Resolution 9 =

United Nations Security Council resolution

UN Security Council Resolution 9
- Date: October 15 1946
- Meeting no.: 76
- Code: S/RES/9 (Document)
- Subject: ICJ jurisdiction
- Voting summary: 11 voted for; None voted against; None abstained
- Result: Adopted unanimously

Security Council composition
- Permanent members: China; France; Soviet Union; United Kingdom; United States
- Non-permanent members: Australia; Brazil; Egypt; Mexico; Netherlands; Poland

United Nations Security Council Resolution 9 was adopted unanimously on 15 October 1946. The Council ruled that the International Court of Justice was open to nations outside of the Statute of the International Court of Justice, provided that the nation agreed to follow the Court's ruling.

== See also ==
- List of International Court of Justice cases
