= United Nations Security Council Resolution 89 =

UN Security Council Resolution 89
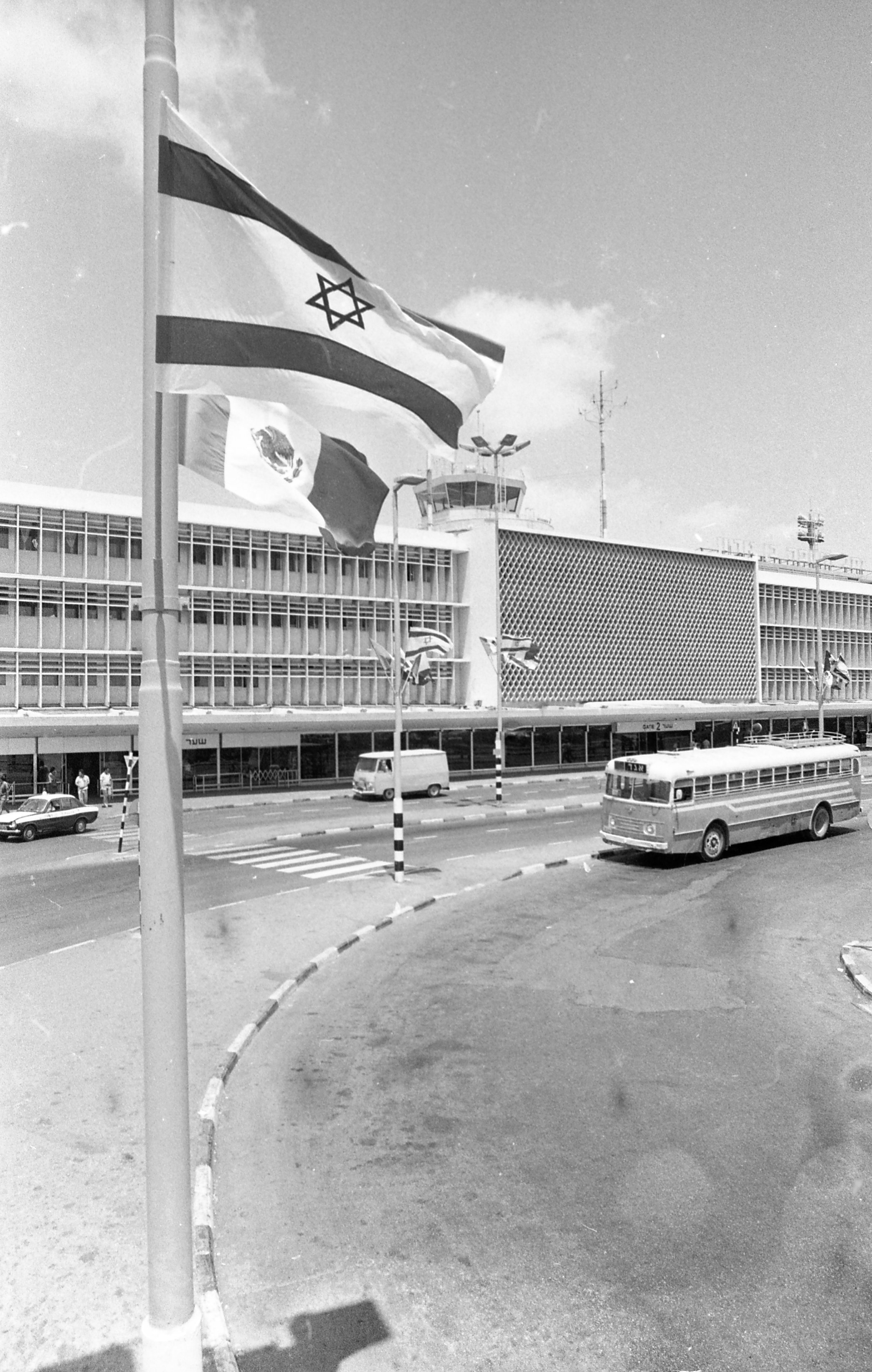
- Israel flag
- Date: November 17 1950
- Meeting no.: 524
- Code: S/1907 (Document)
- Subject: The Palestine Question
- Voting summary: 9 voted for; None voted against; 2 abstained
- Result: Adopted

Security Council composition
- Permanent members: China; France; Soviet Union; United Kingdom; United States
- Non-permanent members: Cuba; Ecuador; Egypt; India; Norway; Yugoslavia

United Nations Security Council Resolution 89, adopted on November 17, 1950, after receiving complaints from Egypt, Israel, Jordan and the Chief of Staff of the Truce Supervision Organization regarding the implementation of the Armistice Agreements designed to end the Arab-Israeli War the Council requested the Egypt-Israel Mixed Armistice Commission give urgent attention to a complaint of expulsion of thousands of Palestinian Arabs. The Council called upon both parties to give effect to any finding by the Commission, repatriating any such Arabs who the Commission believes to be entitled to return. The Council then authorized the Chief of Staff of the Truce Supervision Organization to recommend to Israel, Egypt and such other Arab States appropriate steps he may consider necessary to control the movement of nomadic Arabs across international frontiers or armistice lines by mutual agreement.

The Council called upon the governments concern to take no action involving the transfer of persons across international frontiers or armistice lines without prior consultation through the Commissions. The Council then requested that the Chief of Staff of the Truce Supervision Organization report to them at the end of ninety days, or before he deems it necessary on the compliance given to this resolution and upon the status of the operations of the various Commissions. The Council finally requested that he periodically submit to the Security Council reports of all the decisions made by the various Commissions and of the Special Committee provided for in article X, paragraph 4, of the Egyptian-Israel General Armistice Agreement.

The resolution passed with nine votes to none, with two abstentions from the Kingdom of Egypt and the Soviet Union.

== See also ==
- Arab–Israeli conflict
- List of United Nations Security Council Resolutions 1 to 100 (1946–1953)
