= United Nations Security Council Resolution 72 =

UN Security Council Resolution 72
- Date: August 11 1949
- Meeting no.: 437
- Code: S/1376, I (Document)
- Subject: The Palestine Question
- Result: Adopted

Security Council composition
- Permanent members: China; France; Soviet Union; United Kingdom; United States
- Non-permanent members: Argentina; Canada; Cuba; Egypt; Norway; Ukrainian SSR

United Nations Security Council Resolution 72, adopted on August 11, 1949, after receiving a report by the Acting United Nations Mediator in Palestine on the completion of his responsibilities, the UN decided to pay tribute to the late Count Folke Bernadotte, the then current Acting Mediator Dr. Ralph J. Bunche and the Belgian, French, Swedish and American officers who served on the staff and as military observers in Palestine.

No vote was taken as the resolution was adopted.

== See also ==
- Arab–Israeli conflict
- United Nations Security Council Resolution 73
- List of United Nations Security Council Resolutions 1 to 100 (1946–1953)
