= United Nations Security Council Resolution 57 =

UN Security Council Resolution 57
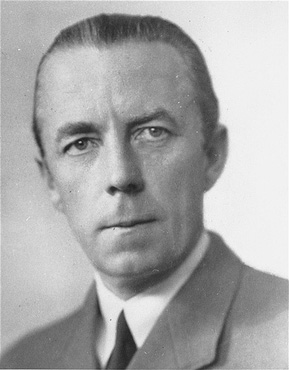
- Folke Bernadotte
- Date: 18 September 1948
- Meeting no.: 358
- Code: S/RES/57 (Document)
- Subject: The Palestine Question
- Voting summary: 11 voted for; None voted against; None abstained
- Result: Adopted

Security Council composition
- Permanent members: China; France; Soviet Union; United Kingdom; United States
- Non-permanent members: Argentina; Belgium; Canada; Colombia; Syria; Ukrainian SSR

United Nations Security Council Resolution 57 was adopted unanimously on 18 September 1948.

Deeply shocked by the death of Count Folke Bernadotte, the United Nations Mediator in Palestine, the Security Council requested that the Secretary-General keep the flag of the United Nations at half-mast for three days, authorized him to meet from the Working Capital Fund all the expenses connected with the assassination of the United Nations Mediator and resolved that it would be represented at the interment by the President or the person appointed by him for the occasion.

== See also ==
- List of United Nations Security Council Resolutions 1 to 100 (1946–1953)
