= United Nations Security Council Resolution 11 =

United Nations Security Council resolution

UN Security Council Resolution 11
- Peace Palace, seat of the ICJ
- Date: November 15 1946
- Meeting no.: 80
- Code: S/RES/11 (Document)
- Subject: The International Court of Justice
- Voting summary: None voted for; None voted against; None abstained
- Result: Adopted

Security Council composition
- Permanent members: China; France; Soviet Union; United Kingdom; United States
- Non-permanent members: Australia; Brazil; Egypt; Mexico; Netherlands; Poland

United Nations Security Council Resolution 11 was adopted on 15 November 1946. Under the conditions of Article 93, Paragraph 2 of the Charter of the United Nations, the Council recommended that the General Assembly admit Switzerland to the International Court of Justice.
