= United Nations Security Council Resolution 100 =

UN Security Council Resolution 100
- Date: October 27 1953
- Meeting no.: 631
- Code: S/3128 (Document)
- Subject: The Palestine Question
- Voting summary: 11 voted for; None voted against; None abstained
- Result: Adopted

Security Council composition
- Permanent members: China; France; Soviet Union; United Kingdom; United States
- Non-permanent members: Chile; Colombia; Denmark; Greece; Lebanon; Pakistan

United Nations Security Council Resolution 100, adopted unanimously on October 27, 1953, after receiving a report from the Chief of Staff of the United Nations Truce Supervision Organization in Palestine the Council found it desirable that work in the demilitarized zone should be suspended. The Council further said it relies on the Chief of Staff of the TSO to inform it regarding the fulfillment of that undertaking.

== See also ==
- Bnot Ya'akov Bridge
- National Water Carrier of Israel
- List of United Nations Security Council Resolutions 1 to 100 (1946–1953)
- List of United Nations Security Council Resolutions 101 to 200 (1953–1965)
