= United Nations Security Council Resolution 90 =

UN Security Council Resolution 90
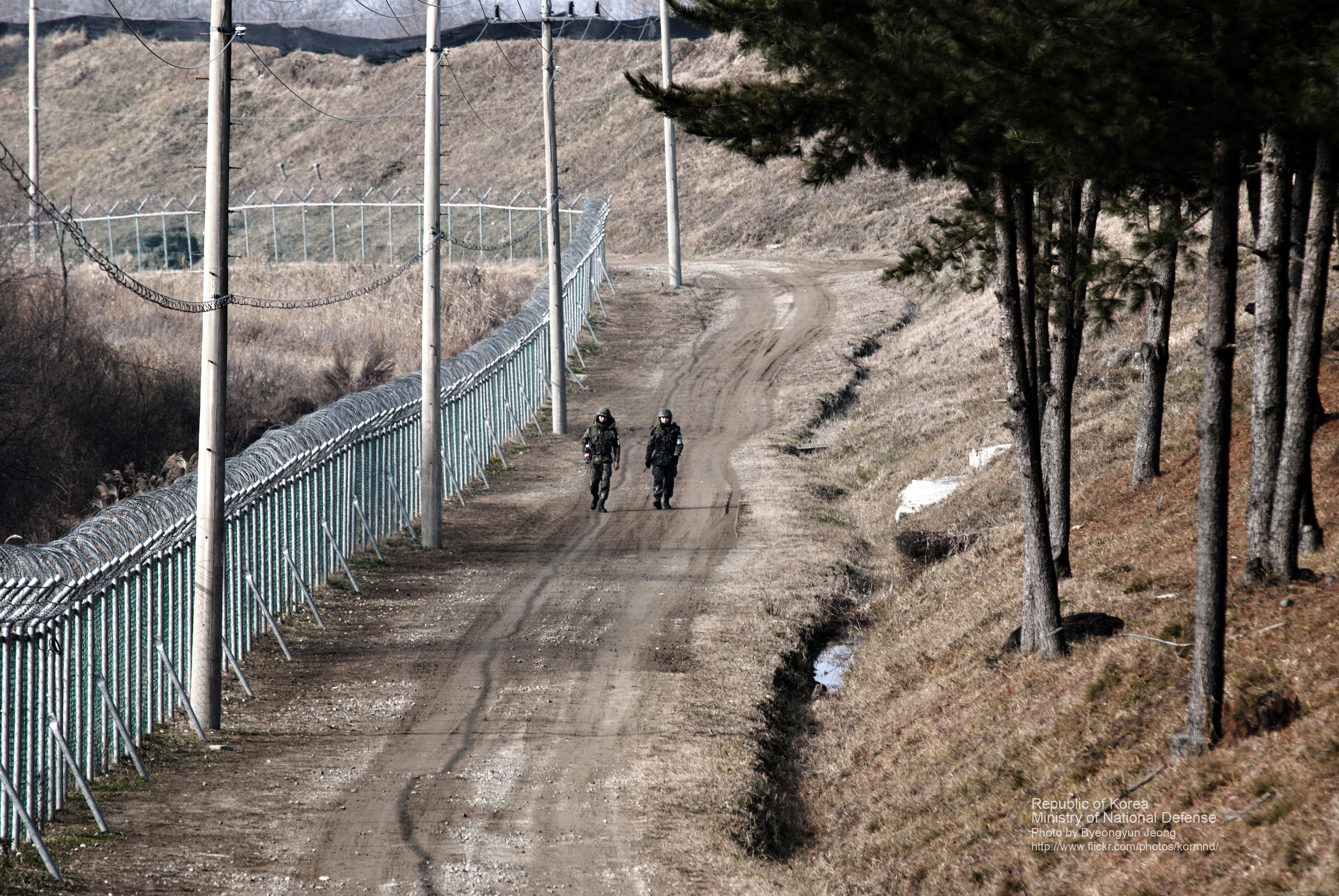
- Korean DMZ
- Date: January 31 1951
- Meeting no.: 531
- Code: S/1995 (Document)
- Subject: Complaint of aggression upon the Republic of Korea
- Voting summary: 11 voted for; None voted against; None abstained
- Result: Adopted

Security Council composition
- Permanent members: China; France; Soviet Union; United Kingdom; United States
- Non-permanent members: Brazil; Ecuador; India; Netherlands; Turkey; Yugoslavia

The United Nations Security Council Resolution 90 was adopted by the United Nations Security Council (UNSC) on 31 January 1951. It resolved to remove the item "Complaint of aggression upon the Republic of Korea" from the list of matters of which the Council is seized.

== See also ==
- Korean War
- Aggression
- Use of force in international law
- Chapter VII of the United Nations Charter
- List of United Nations Security Council Resolutions 1 to 100 (1946–1953
- Timeline of Korean history
