= United Nations Security Council Resolution 42 =

1948 resolution on "The Palestine question"

UN Security Council Resolution 42
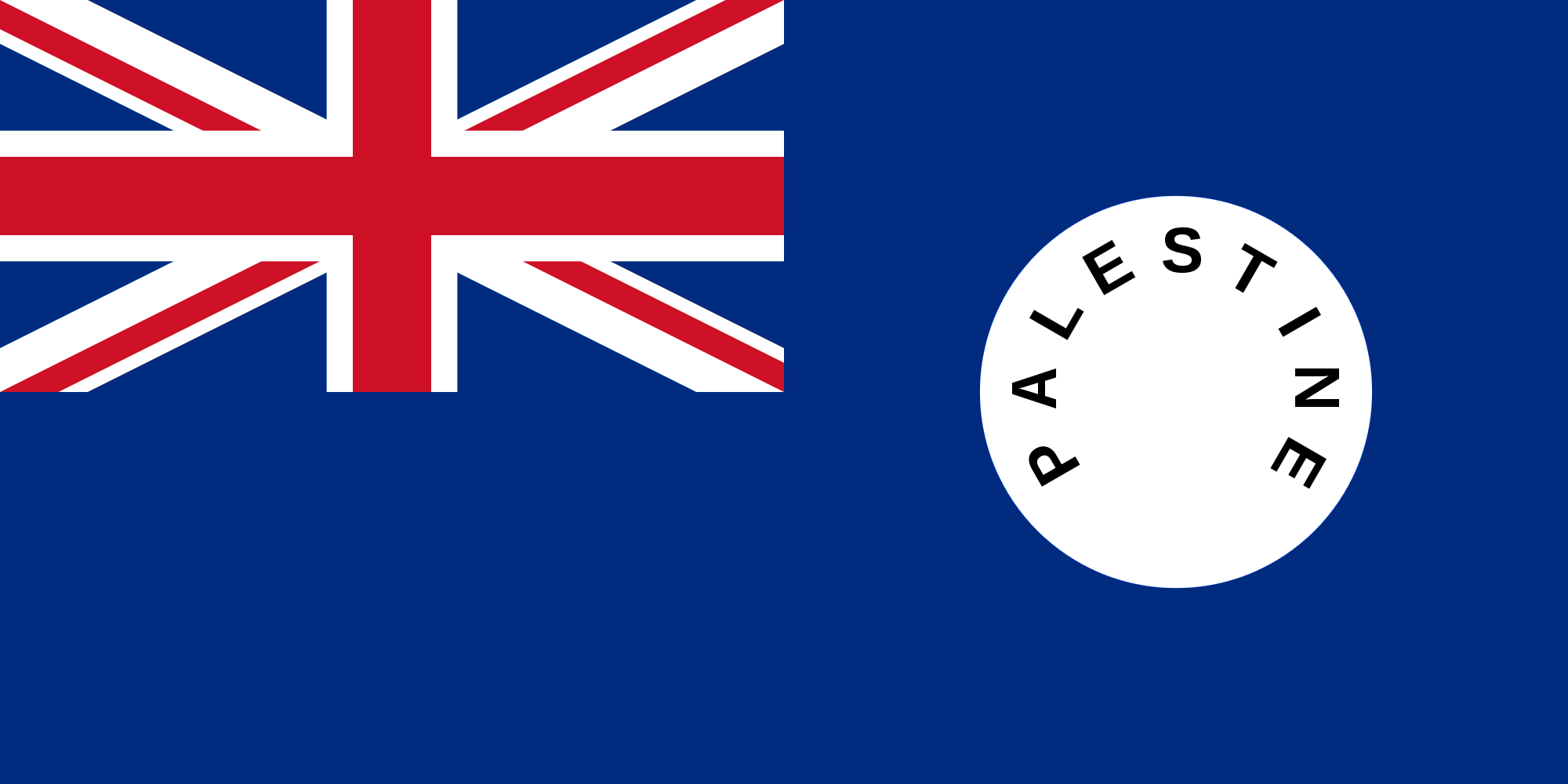
- Palestine flag
- Date: 5 March 1948
- Meeting no.: 263
- Code: S/691 (Document)
- Subject: The Palestine question
- Voting summary: 8 voted for; None voted against; 3 abstained
- Result: Adopted

Security Council composition
- Permanent members: China; France; Soviet Union; United Kingdom; United States
- Non-permanent members: Argentina; Belgium; Canada; Colombia; Syria; Ukrainian SSR

United Nations Security Council Resolution 42 was adopted on 5 March 1948. The Council called on its permanent members to report on the situation in Palestine and to make recommendations to the Palestine Commission within 10 days.

Resolution 42 passed with eight votes to none. Argentina, Syria and the United Kingdom abstained.

== See also ==
- List of United Nations Security Council Resolutions 1 to 100 (1946–1953)
