= United Nations Security Council Resolution 61 =

UN Security Council Resolution 61
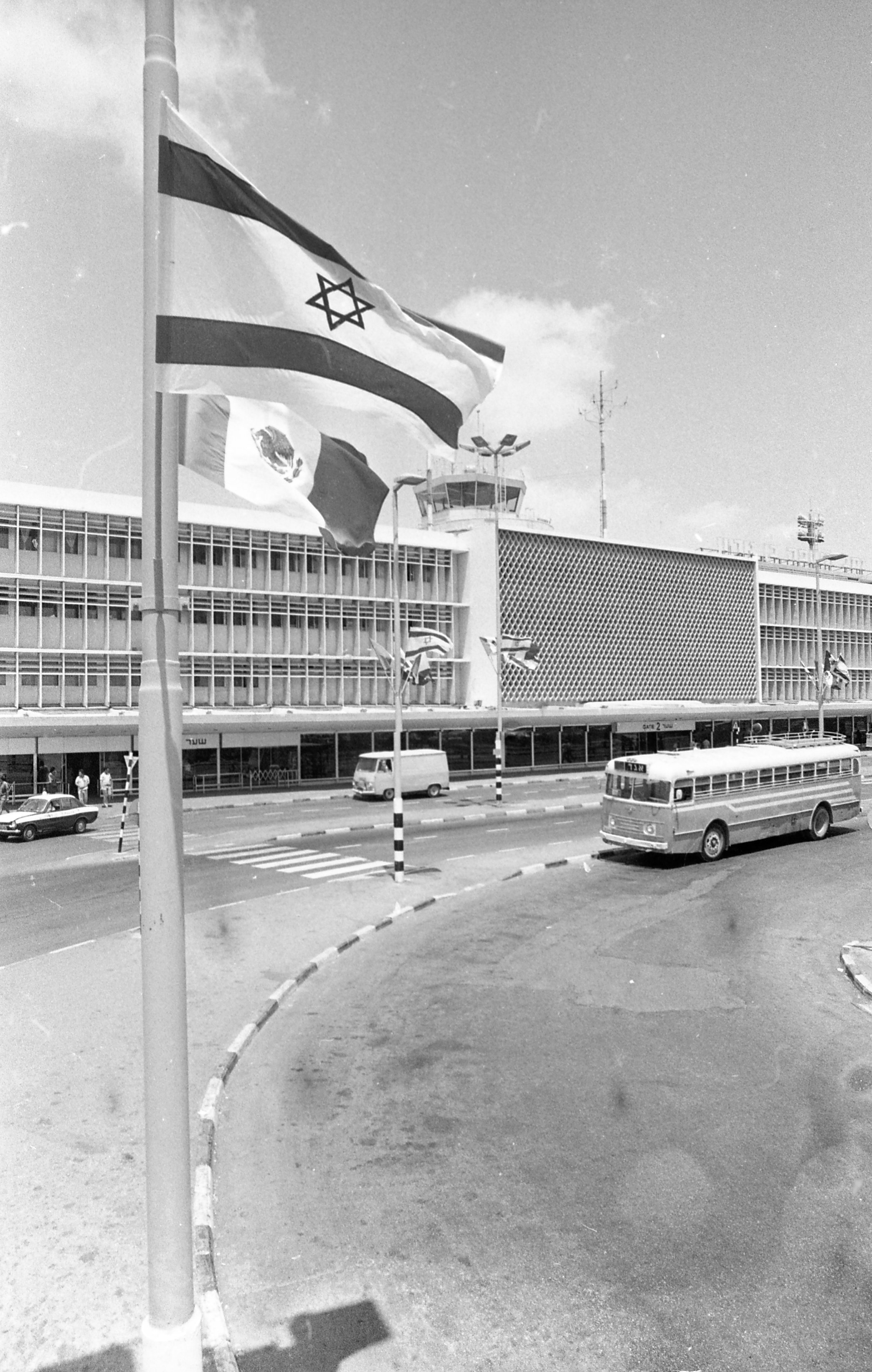
- Israel flag
- Date: November 4 1948
- Meeting no.: 377
- Code: S/1070 (Document)
- Subject: The Palestine Question
- Voting summary: 9 voted for; 1 voted against; 1 abstained
- Result: Adopted

Security Council composition
- Permanent members: China; France; Soviet Union; United Kingdom; United States
- Non-permanent members: Argentina; Belgium; Canada; Colombia; Syria; Ukrainian SSR

United Nations Security Council Resolution 61, adopted on November 4, 1948, decided that the truce established in United Nations Security Council Resolution 54 shall remain in effect until a peaceful adjustment of the future situation of Palestine is reached. To that end the Council ordered the withdraw of the forces in the area back to the positions held on the 14th of October with the Acting Mediator being authorized to establish provisional lines beyond which no movement of troops was to take place. The Council also decreed that neutral zones shall be established through negotiations between the parties, or failing that, by the decision of the Acting Mediator.

The resolution also appointed a committee consisting of the five permanent members of the Council together with Belgium and Colombia to advise the Acting Mediator and, should either or both parties fail to comply with the resolution, advise the Council on what further measures it would be appropriate to take under Chapter VII of the Charter.

The resolution was adopted with nine votes and one against (Ukrainian SSR), while the Soviet Union abstained.

== See also ==
- List of United Nations Security Council Resolutions 1 to 100 (1946–1953)
