= United Nations Security Council Resolution 54 =

United Nations Security Council resolution

UN Security Council Resolution 54
- Palestine flag
- Date: July 15 1948
- Meeting no.: 338
- Code: S/902 (Document)
- Subject: The Palestine Question
- Voting summary: 7 voted for; 1 voted against; 3 abstained
- Result: Adopted

Security Council composition
- Permanent members: China; France; Soviet Union; United Kingdom; United States
- Non-permanent members: Argentina; Belgium; Canada; Colombia; Syria; Ukrainian SSR

United Nations Security Council Resolution 54, adopted on 15 July 1948, determined that the situation in Palestine constitutes a threat to the peace within the meaning of Article 39 of the Charter of the United Nations. The resolution ordered all governments and authorities concerned to desist from further military action and to issue a cease-fire to their military and paramilitary forces to take effect at a time to be determined by the mediator in the next three days. It also declared that failure to comply with these orders would demonstrate the existence of a breach of the peace within the meaning of article 39 of the Charter and would require immediate consideration by the Council.

The Resolution further ordered that as a matter of special necessity an immediate and unconditional cease-fire in the City of Jerusalem take place the next day. The Resolution instructed the United Nations Mediator, Folke Bernadotte, to continue his efforts to de-militarize the City of Jerusalem and assure safe access to it, to examine the alleged breaches of the earlier truces established by the Council and to that end requested the Secretary-General provide him with the necessary staff, funding and facilities needed to carry out his tasks.

The resolution was passed with seven votes in favour. Syria voted against the resolution while Argentina, the Ukrainian SSR and Soviet Union abstained from the vote.

== See also ==
- List of United Nations Security Council Resolutions 1 to 100 (1946–1953)
- United Nations Security Council Resolution 56
- United Nations Security Council Resolution 61
