= History of Ecuador (1944–1960) =

Overview of the history of Ecuador, 1944–1960

This is a summary of the history of Ecuador from 1944 to 1960.

== Galo Plaza ==
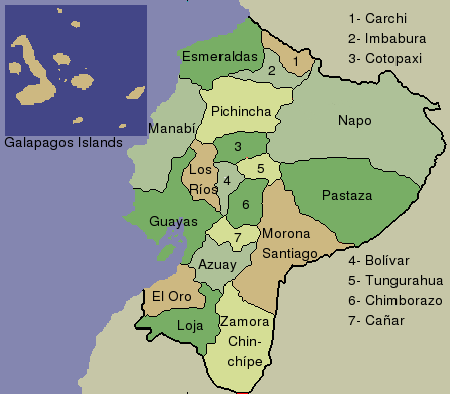
Ecuador in 1959.

Galo Plaza differed from previous Ecuadorian presidents. Plaza brought a developmentalist and technocratic emphasis to Ecuadorian government. No doubt, Galo Plaza's most important contribution to Ecuadorian political culture was his commitment to the principles and practices of democracy. As president, he managed to foment the agricultural exports of Ecuador during his government, creating economic stability. During his presidency, the 1949 Ambato earthquake severely damaged the city and surrounding areas and killed approximately 5,050 people. Unable to succeed himself, he left his office in 1952 as the first president in 28 years to complete his term in office.

== José María Velasco Ibarra ==
A proof of the politically stabilizing effect of the banana boom of the 1950s is that even José María Velasco Ibarra, who in 1952 was elected president for the third time, managed to serve out a full four-year term. He continued to spend as before—building bridges, roads, and schools at will and rewarding his political supporters (including, this time, the military) with jobs, salary increases, and weapons—but, in contrast to his previous times in office, there were now sufficient funds to pay for everything.

Always the master populist, Velasco (who by now liked to be known as "the National Personification") again came to power with the support of the common man, this time through the vehicle of the Guayaquil-based Concentration of Popular Forces (Spanish: Concentración de Fuerzas Populares, CFP). Once in office, however, he arrested and deported the CFP boss, Carlos Guevara Moreno, together with several other party leaders. Guevara Moreno reassumed control of the CFP in 1955 following a three-year exile. Velasco's subsequent party support during the 1950s came from the Conservatives, the conservative Social Christian Movement (Spanish: Movimiento Social Cristiano, MSC), and the highly nationalistic, anticommunist, quasi-fascist Ecuadorian Nationalist Revolutionary Action (Spanish: Acción Revolucionaria Nacionalista Ecuatoriana ARNE).

On repeated occasions, members of ARNE acted violently and as shock troops, attacking students, labor unions, and the press. In 1955 Velasco also chose to pick a fight with the United States. In the opening round of what would later become known as the "tuna war," Ecuadorian officials seized two fishing boats carrying the United States flag, charging them with fishing inside the 200-nautical mile limit claimed by Ecuador as territorial seas under its sovereignty.

== Camilo Ponce Enríquez ==
In 1956, Camilo Ponce Enríquez, the MSC founder who had served in Velasco's cabinet, assumed the presidency after a close election replete with allegations of fraud. Although late support from Velasco proved crucial to Ponce's victory, shortly afterward "the National Personification" became the principal opponent of the new chief executive. In a display of statesmanship and political acumen, Ponce co-opted the Liberal opposition by including it, along with Conservatives and the MSC, in his cabinet.

Although Ponce did not enact the Social Christian reforms of which he spoke vaguely during the campaign, the relative political calm that prevailed during his four years in office was, in itself, an accomplishment given the worsening economic situation. Ponce's term saw the end of the banana boom that had sustained more than a decade of constitutional rule. Falling export prices led to rising unemployment and a social malaise that briefly erupted into riots in 1959. By the following year, the effects of the discontent were ready to be exploited by the populist appeal of the irrepressible Velasco, who was elected with his widest margin of victory ever. Velasco's fourth turn in the presidency initiated a renewal of crisis, instability, and military domination and ended conjecture that the political system had matured or developed a democratic mold.
