= United Nations Security Council Resolution 685 =

UN Security Council Resolution 685
- Iraq (orange) and Iran (green)
- Date: 31 January 1991
- Meeting no.: 2,976
- Code: S/RES/685 (Document)
- Subject: Iran–Iraq
- Voting summary: 15 voted for; None voted against; None abstained
- Result: Adopted

Security Council composition
- Permanent members: China; France; Soviet Union; United Kingdom; United States
- Non-permanent members: Austria; Belgium; Côte d'Ivoire; Cuba; Ecuador; India; Romania; Yemen; Zaire; Zimbabwe

United Nations Security Council resolution 685, adopted unanimously on 31 January 1991, after recalling resolutions 598 (1987), 618 (1988), 631 (1989), 642 (1989), 651 (1990), 671 (1990) and 676 (1990), and having considered a report by the Secretary-General Javier Pérez de Cuéllar on the United Nations Iran–Iraq Military Observer Group, the Council decided:

(a) to renew the mandate of the United Nations Iran–Iraq Military Observer Group for one more month until 28 February 1991;
(b) to request the Secretary-General, after discussions with both parties, to report on the future of the Observer Group with his recommendations during February 1991.

== See also ==
- Iran–Iraq relations
- Iran–Iraq War
- List of United Nations Security Council Resolutions 601 to 700 (1987–1991)
