= United Nations Security Council Resolution 799 =

UN Security Council Resolution 799
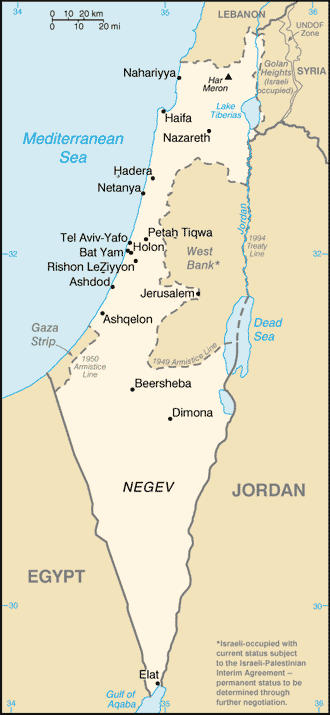
- Israel and the occupied territories
- Date: 18 December 1992
- Meeting no.: 3,151
- Code: S/RES/799 (Document)
- Subject: Territories occupied by Israel
- Voting summary: 15 voted for; None voted against; None abstained
- Result: Adopted

Security Council composition
- Permanent members: China; France; Russia; United Kingdom; United States
- Non-permanent members: Austria; Belgium; Cape Verde; Ecuador; Hungary; India; Japan; Morocco; Venezuela; Zimbabwe

United Nations Security Council resolution 799, adopted unanimously on 18 December 1992, after reaffirming resolutions 607 (1988), 608 (1990), 636 (1989), 641 (1989), 681 (1990), 694 (1991) and 726 (1992) and learning of the deportation of hundreds of Palestinians by Israel in the occupied territories on 17 December 1992, the Council condemned the deportations that were in violation of the Fourth Geneva Convention referring to the protection of civilians in times of war.

The resolution deplored the action and reiterated that Israel should refrain from deporting any more Palestinians and ensure the safe and immediate return of those deported.

== See also ==
- Abduction and killing of Nissim Toledano
- Arab–Israeli conflict
- First Intifada
- Israeli–Palestinian conflict
- List of United Nations Security Council Resolutions 701 to 800 (1991–1993)
