= United Nations Security Council Resolution 676 =

UN Security Council Resolution 676
- Iraq (orange) and Iran (green)
- Date: 28 November 1990
- Meeting no.: 2,961
- Code: S/RES/676 (Document)
- Subject: Iran–Iraq
- Voting summary: 15 voted for; None voted against; None abstained
- Result: Adopted

Security Council composition
- Permanent members: China; France; Soviet Union; United Kingdom; United States
- Non-permanent members: Canada; Colombia; Côte d'Ivoire; Cuba; Ethiopia; Finland; Malaysia; Romania; Yemen; Zaire

United Nations Security Council resolution 676, adopted unanimously on 28 November 1990, after recalling resolutions 598 (1987), 618 (1988), 631 (1989), 642 (1989), 651 (1990) and 671 (1990), and having considered a report by the Secretary-General Javier Pérez de Cuéllar on the United Nations Iran–Iraq Military Observer Group, the Council decided:

(a) to renew the mandate of the United Nations Iran–Iraq Military Observer Group for another two months until 31 January 1991;
(b) to request the Secretary-General, after discussions with both parties, to report on the future of the Observer Group with his recommendations during January 1991.

== See also ==
- Iran–Iraq relations
- Iran–Iraq War
- List of United Nations Security Council Resolutions 601 to 700 (1987–1991)
