= United Nations Security Council Resolution 726 =

UN Security Council Resolution 726
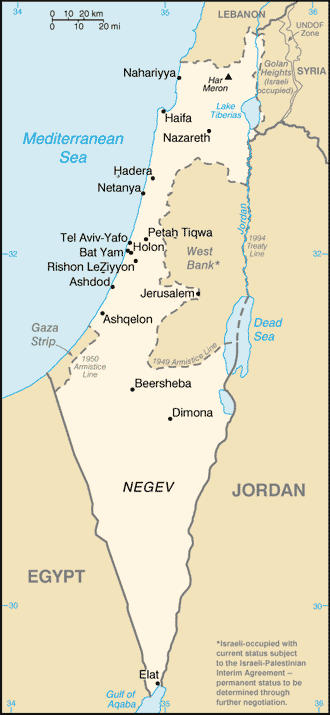
- Israel and the occupied territories
- Date: 6 January 1992
- Meeting no.: 3,026
- Code: S/RES/726 (Document)
- Subject: Territories occupied by Israel
- Voting summary: 15 voted for; None voted against; None abstained
- Result: Adopted

Security Council composition
- Permanent members: China; France; Russia; United Kingdom; United States
- Non-permanent members: Austria; Belgium; Cape Verde; Ecuador; Hungary; India; Japan; Morocco; Venezuela; Zimbabwe

United Nations Security Council resolution 726, adopted unanimously on 6 January 1992, after reaffirming 607 (1988), 608 (1988), 636 (1989), 641 (1989) and 694 (1991) and learning of the deportation of twelve Palestinians by Israel in the occupied territories, the Council condemned the deportations that were in violation of the Fourth Geneva Convention referring to the protection of civilians in times of war.

The resolution deplored the action and reiterated that Israel should refrain from deporting any more Palestinians and ensure the safe and immediate return of those deported. Israel did not comply with the resolution however, and continued to deport Palestinians who were suspected of being involved in terrorist activities with neighbouring Arab countries.

== See also ==
- Arab–Israeli conflict
- First Intifada
- Israeli–Palestinian conflict
- List of United Nations Security Council Resolutions 701 to 800 (1991–1993)
