= United Nations Security Council Resolution 698 =

UN Security Council Resolution 698
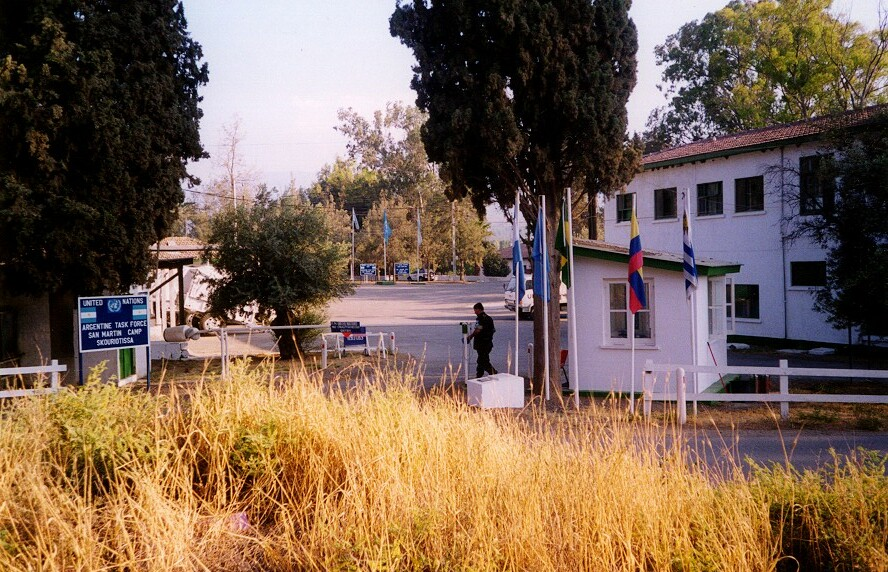
- UNFICYP base
- Date: 14 June 1991
- Meeting no.: 2,993
- Code: S/RES/698 (Document)
- Subject: Cyprus
- Voting summary: 15 voted for; None voted against; None abstained
- Result: Adopted

Security Council composition
- Permanent members: China; France; Soviet Union; United Kingdom; United States
- Non-permanent members: Austria; Belgium; Côte d'Ivoire; Cuba; Ecuador; India; Romania; Yemen; Zaire; Zimbabwe

United Nations Security Council resolution 698, adopted unanimously on 14 June 1991, after recalling Resolution 682 (1990) dealing with financial issues and all resolutions on Cyprus up to the most recent Resolution 697 (1991), the Council expressed its concern regarding the financial situation facing the United Nations Peacekeeping Force in Cyprus (UNFICYP), established in Resolution 186 (1964).

The Council concluded, from a report, that a method of financing the Force is needed that would put it on a sound and secure "financial basis", with the aim of reducing and clearly defining the costs for the UNFICYP. It also requested the Secretary-General to hold consultations with the Council and Member States who contribute to the Force and others, and to report back by 15 December 1991, by the time of the extension of the next mandate, on the financial measures to be taken.

The report pursuant to this resolution identified measures of savings including from a reduction of troop numbers, a reduction of personnel with a seasonal increase, transformation of the Force into an Observer Mission, abolition of humanitarian and economic work, or to use less expensive troops.

== See also ==
- Cyprus dispute
- List of United Nations Security Council Resolutions 601 to 700 (1987–1991)
- United Nations Buffer Zone in Cyprus
- Turkish invasion of Cyprus
