= United Nations Security Council Resolution 671 =

UN Security Council Resolution 671
- Iraq (orange) and Iran (green)
- Date: 27 September 1990
- Meeting no.: 2,944
- Code: S/RES/671 (Document)
- Subject: Iran–Iraq
- Voting summary: 15 voted for; None voted against; None abstained
- Result: Adopted

Security Council composition
- Permanent members: China; France; Soviet Union; United Kingdom; United States
- Non-permanent members: Canada; Colombia; Côte d'Ivoire; Cuba; Ethiopia; Finland; Malaysia; Romania; Yemen; Zaire

United Nations Security Council resolution 671 was adopted unanimously on 27 September 1990. Recalling resolutions 598 (1987), 619 (1988), 631 (1989), 642 (1989) and 651 (1990), and having considered a report by the Secretary-General Javier Pérez de Cuéllar on the United Nations Iran–Iraq Military Observer Group, the Security Council decided:

(a) to renew the mandate of the United Nations Iran–Iraq Military Observer Group for another two months until 30 November 1990;
(b) to request the Secretary-General, after discussions with both parties, to report on the future of the Observer Group with his recommendations during November.

== See also ==
- Iran–Iraq relations
- Iran–Iraq War
- List of United Nations Security Council Resolutions 601 to 700 (1987–1991)
