= List of United Nations Security Council Resolutions 601 to 700 =

This is a list of United Nations Security Council Resolutions 601 to 700 adopted between 30 October 1987 and 17 June 1991.

Resolution	Date	Vote	Concerns
601	30 October 1987	14–0–1 (abstention: United States)	Condemns continued occupation of Namibia by South Africa
602	25 November 1987	15–0–0	South African attack on Angola
603	25 November 1987	15–0–0	Extends mandate of the United Nations Disengagement Observer Force
604	14 December 1987	15–0–0	Extends mandate of the United Nations Peacekeeping Force in Cyprus
605	22 December 1987	14–0–1 (abstention: United States)	Practices in the Israeli-occupied territories
606	23 December 1987	15–0–0	Occupation of southern Angola by South African forces
607	5 January 1988	15–0–0	Deportation of Palestinians in the occupied territories
608	14 January 1988	14–0–1 (abstention: United States)	Deportation of Palestinians in the occupied territories
609	29 January 1988	15–0–0	Extends mandate of the United Nations Interim Force in Lebanon
610	16 March 1988	15–0–0	Proposed execution of the Sharpeville Six in South Africa
611	25 April 1988	14–0–1 (abstention: United States)	Assassination of Khalil al-Wazir in Tunisia
612	9 May 1988	15–0–0	Use of chemical weapons in Iran–Iraq War
613	31 May 1988	15–0–0	Extends mandate of the United Nations Disengagement Observer Force
614	15 June 1988	15–0–0	Extends mandate of the United Nations Peacekeeping Force in Cyprus
615	17 June 1988	15–0–0	Proposed execution of the Sharpeville Six in South Africa
616	20 July 1988	15–0–0	Authorises investigation by the ICAO into the downing of Iran Air Flight 655
617	29 July 1988	15–0–0	Extends mandate of the United Nations Interim Force in Lebanon
618	29 July 1988	15–0–0	Abduction of Lieutenant-Colonel William R. Higgins in Lebanon
619	9 August 1988	15–0–0	Establishes the United Nations Iran–Iraq Military Observer Group
620	26 August 1988	15–0–0	Use of chemical weapons in Iran–Iraq War
621	20 September 1988	15–0–0	Appoints Special Representative for Western Sahara
622	31 October 1988	15–0–0	Confirms establishment of the United Nations Good Offices Mission in Afghanistan and Pakistan
623	23 November 1988	13–0–2 (abstentions: United Kingdom, United States)	Death sentence of anti-apartheid activist Paul Tefo Setlaba in South Africa
624	30 November 1988	15–0–0	Extends mandate of the United Nations Disengagement Observer Force
625	15 December 1988	15–0–0	Extends mandate of the United Nations Peacekeeping Force in Cyprus
626	20 December 1988	15–0–0	Establishes the United Nations Angola Verification Mission I
627	9 January 1989	15–0–0	Vacancy at the International Court of Justice
628	16 January 1989	15–0–0	Welcomes the Tripartite Accord signed by Angola, Cuba and South Africa
629	16 January 1989	15–0–0	Sets 1 April 1989, as date for implementation of Resolution 435 for elections in Namibia
630	30 January 1989	15–0–0	Extends mandate of the United Nations Interim Force in Lebanon
631	8 February 1989	15–0–0	Extends mandate of the United Nations Iran–Iraq Military Observer Group
632	16 February 1989	15–0–0	Report by Secretary-General on the United Nations plan for Namibia
633	30 May 1989	15–0–0	Extends mandate of the United Nations Disengagement Observer Force
634	9 June 1989	15–0–0	Extends mandate of the United Nations Peacekeeping Force in Cyprus
635	14 June 1989	15–0–0	Calling for special marking of explosives to prevent terrorism against civil aircraft
636	6 July 1989	14–0–1 (abstention: United States)	Deportation of Palestinians from the occupied territories
637	27 July 1989	15–0–0	Engagement of UN in peace progress in Central America
638	31 July 1989	15–0–0	Hostage-taking
639	31 July 1989	15–0–0	Extends mandate of the United Nations Interim Force in Lebanon
640	29 August 1989	15–0–0	Demands full implementation of Resolution 435 (1978) in Namibia
641	30 August 1989	14–0–1 (abstention: United States)	Deportation of Palestinians from the occupied territories
642	29 September 1989	15–0–0	Extends mandate of the United Nations Iran–Iraq Military Observer Group
643	31 October 1989	15–0–0	Demands full implementation of Resolution 435 (1978) in Namibia
644	7 November 1989	15–0–0	Establishes the United Nations Observer Group in Central America
645	29 November 1989	15–0–0	Extends mandate of the United Nations Disengagement Observer Force
646	14 December 1989	15–0–0	Extends mandate of the United Nations Peacekeeping Force in Cyprus
647	11 January 1990	15–0–0	Extends mandate of the United Nations Good Offices Mission in Afghanistan and Pakistan
648	31 January 1990	15–0–0	Extends mandate of the United Nations Interim Force in Lebanon
649	12 March 1990	15–0–0	Reaffirms Resolution 367 (1975) regarding Cyprus
650	27 March 1990	15–0–0	Enlarges United Nations Observer Group in Central America
651	29 March 1990	15–0–0	Extends mandate of the United Nations Iran–Iraq Military Observer Group
652	17 April 1990	15–0–0	Admission of the Republic of Namibia to the United Nations
653	20 April 1990	15–0–0	Addition of tasks for the United Nations Observer Group in Central America
654	4 May 1990	15–0–0	Extends mandate of the United Nations Observer Group in Central America
655	31 May 1990	15–0–0	Extends mandate of the United Nations Disengagement Observer Force
656	8 June 1990	15–0–0	Extends tasks of the United Nations Observer Group in Central America
657	15 June 1990	15–0–0	Extends mandate of the United Nations Peacekeeping Force in Cyprus
658	27 June 1990	15–0–0	Proposed settlement of Western Sahara issue
659	31 July 1990	15–0–0	Extends mandate of the United Nations Interim Force in Lebanon
660	2 August 1990	14–0–0 (Yemen did not participate)	Condemns the Iraqi invasion of Kuwait
661	6 August 1990	13–0–2 (abstentions: Cuba, Yemen)	Sanctions Iraq over its invasion of Kuwait
662	9 August 1990	15–0–0	Condemns annexation of Kuwait to Iraq
663	14 August 1990	15–0–0	Admission of the Principality of Liechtenstein to the United Nations
664	18 August 1990	15–0–0	Demanding Iraq leave Kuwait
665	25 August 1990	15–0–0	Sanctions on Iraq
666	13 September 1990	13–2–0 (against: Cuba, Yemen)	Sanctions and humanitarian aid regarding Iraq
667	16 September 1990	15–0–0	Condemns Iraqi attacks on foreign diplomatic personnel
668	20 September 1990	15–0–0	Endorses framework for peace settlement in Cambodia
669	24 September 1990	15–0–0	Requests for assistance relating to Iraq
670	25 September 1990	14–1–0 (against: Cuba)	Civil aviation sanctions on Iraq
671	27 September 1990	15–0–0	Extends mandate of the United Nations Iran–Iraq Military Observer Group
672	12 October 1990	15–0–0	1990 Temple Mount riots
673	24 October 1990	15–0–0	Refusal of Israel to receive mission investigating Temple Mount riots
674	29 October 1990	13–0–2 (abstentions: Cuba, Yemen)	Well-being of nationals and third state nationals in Iraq and Kuwait
675	5 November 1990	15–0–0	Extends mandate of the United Nations Observer Group in Central America
676	28 November 1990	15–0–0	Extends mandate of the United Nations Iran–Iraq Military Observer Group
677	28 November 1990	15–0–0	Condemns Iraq for altering the demographic record of Kuwait
678	29 November 1990	12–2–1 (against: Cuba, Yemen; abstention: China)	Authorises Gulf War as a means to uphold previous resolutions
679	30 November 1990	15–0–0	Extends mandate of the United Nations Disengagement Observer Force
680	14 December 1990	14–0–1 (abstention: Canada)	Extends mandate of the United Nations Peacekeeping Force in Cyprus
681	20 December 1990	15–0–0	Report on territories occupied by Israel
682	21 December 1990	15–0–0	Financial costs of the United Nations Peacekeeping Force in Cyprus
683	22 December 1990	14–1–0 (against: Cuba)	Ends the trusteeship for the Marshall Islands and Micronesia
684	30 January 1991	15–0–0	Extends mandate of the United Nations Interim Force in Lebanon
685	31 January 1991	15–0–0	Extends mandate of the United Nations Iran–Iraq Military Observer Group
686	2 March 1991	11–1–3 (against: Cuba; abstentions: China, India, Yemen)	Conditions on Iraq, ends Gulf War
687	3 April 1991	12–1–2 (against: Cuba; abstentions: Ecuador, Yemen)	Kuwaiti liberation
688	5 April 1991	10–3–2 (against: Cuba, Yemen, Zimbabwe; abstentions: China, India)	Demanding Iraq end its dictatorship
689	9 April 1991	15–0–0	Establishes the United Nations Iraq–Kuwait Observation Mission
690	29 April 1991	15–0–0	Establishes the United Nations Mission for the Referendum in Western Sahara
691	6 May 1991	15–0–0	Extends mandate of the United Nations Observer Group in Central America
692	20 May 1991	14–0–1 (abstention: Cuba)	Establishes the United Nations Compensation Commission for Iraq and Kuwait
693	20 May 1991	15–0–0	Establishes the United Nations Observer Mission in El Salvador
694	24 May 1991	15–0–0	Deportations of Palestinian civilians by Israel
695	30 May 1991	15–0–0	Extends mandate of the United Nations Disengagement Observer Force
696	30 May 1991	15–0–0	Establishes the United Nations Angola Verification Mission II
697	14 June 1991	15–0–0	Extends mandate of the United Nations Peacekeeping Force in Cyprus
698	14 June 1991	15–0–0	Financial costs of the United Nations Peacekeeping Force in Cyprus
699	17 June 1991	15–0–0	Confirms continuing authority of IAEA and Special Commission in Iraq
700	17 June 1991	15–0–0	Full implementation of arms and related sanctions against Iraq

== See also ==
- Lists of United Nations Security Council resolutions
- List of United Nations Security Council Resolutions 501 to 600
- List of United Nations Security Council Resolutions 701 to 800
