= United Nations Security Council Resolution 654 =

UN Security Council Resolution 654
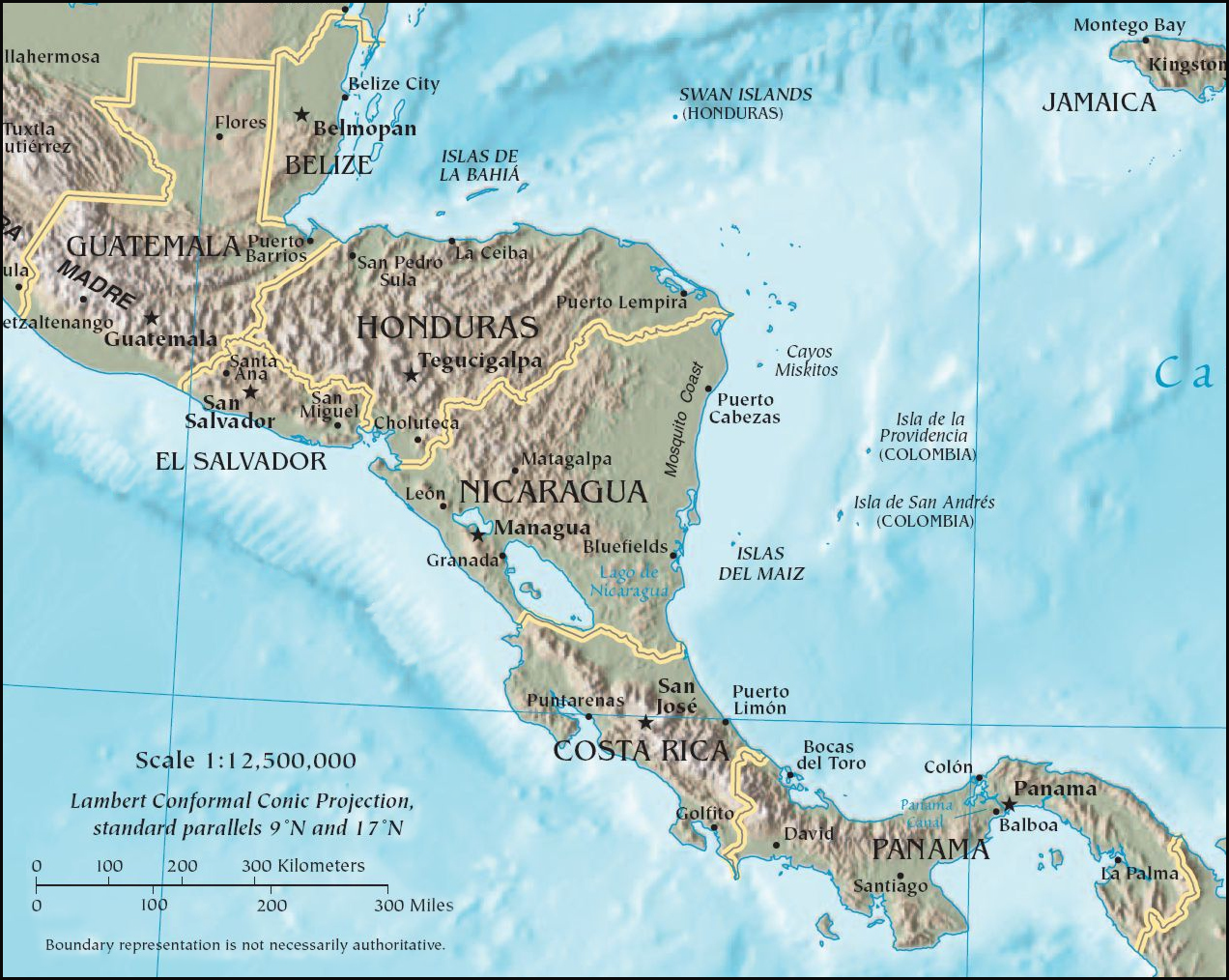
- Central America
- Date: 4 May 1990
- Meeting no.: 2,921
- Code: S/RES/654 (Document)
- Subject: Central America
- Voting summary: 15 voted for; None voted against; None abstained
- Result: Adopted

Security Council composition
- Permanent members: China; France; Soviet Union; United Kingdom; United States
- Non-permanent members: Canada; Colombia; Côte d'Ivoire; Cuba; Ethiopia; Finland; Malaysia; Romania; South Yemen; Zaire

United Nations Security Council resolution 654, adopted unanimously on 4 May 1990, after recalling resolutions 637 (1989), 644 (1989), 650 (1990) and 653 (1990), the council endorsed a report by the Secretary-General and decided to extend the mandate of the United Nations Observer Group in Central America for a further six months until 7 November 1990.

The decision to extend the mandate was taken on the council's understanding that the demobilisation process of the Contras and other resistance in Nicaragua would be completed by 10 June 1990. The resolution also noted the need to remain vigilant of the financial costs of the Observer Group, given the increased demand on United Nations peacekeeping forces.

The Council went on to welcome the efforts of the Secretary-General to find a solution to the conflict in El Salvador concerning the Government of El Salvador and the Farabundo Martí National Liberation Front, and requested him to report back by 10 June 1990 concerning the completion of the demobilisation process.

== See also ==
- History of Central America
- History of El Salvador
- History of Nicaragua
- List of United Nations Security Council Resolutions 601 to 700 (1987–1991)
