= United Nations Security Council Resolution 656 =

UN Security Council Resolution 656
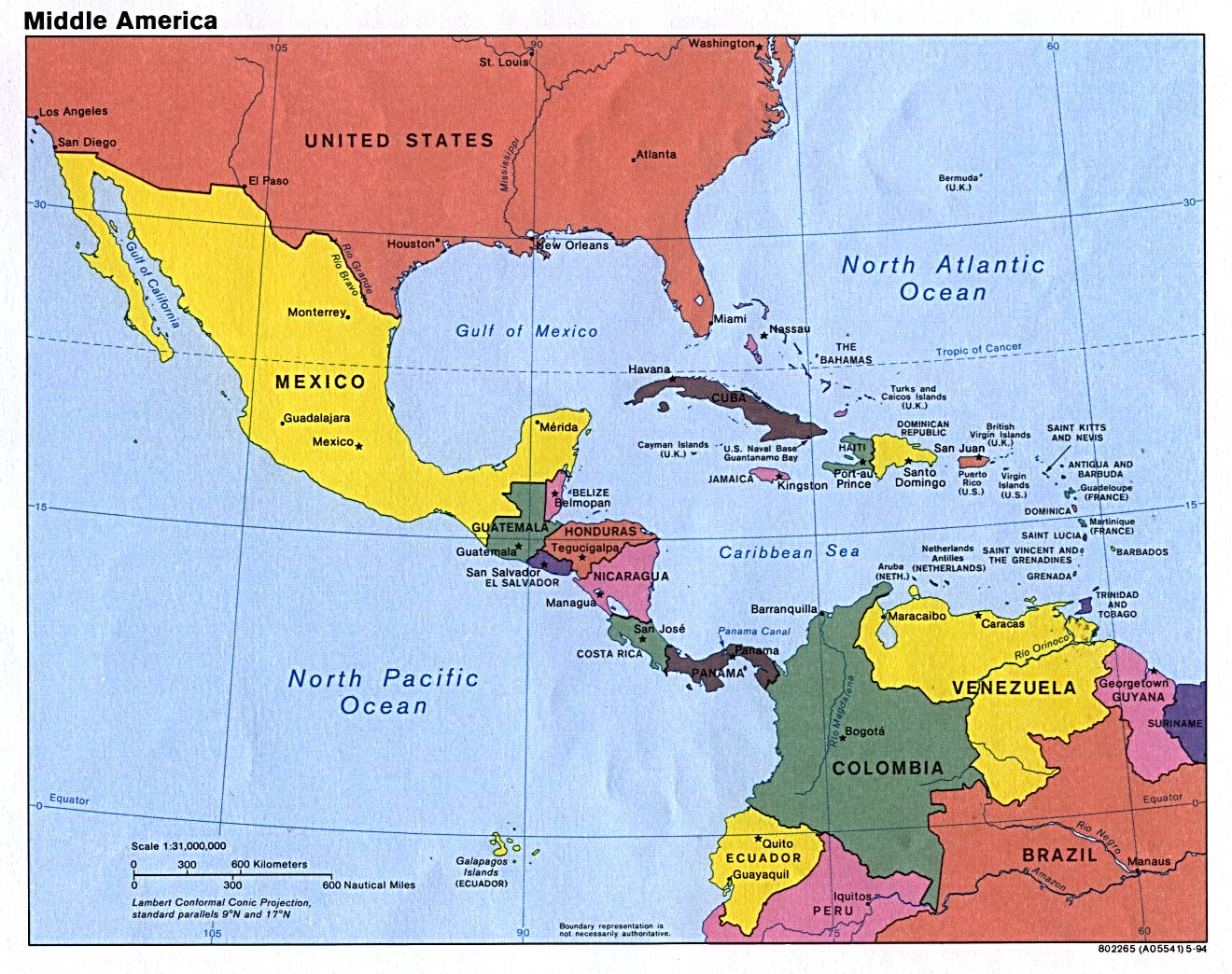
- Central America
- Date: 8 June 1990
- Meeting no.: 2,927
- Code: S/RES/656 (Document)
- Subject: Central America
- Voting summary: 15 voted for; None voted against; None abstained
- Result: Adopted

Security Council composition
- Permanent members: China; France; Soviet Union; United Kingdom; United States
- Non-permanent members: Canada; Colombia; Côte d'Ivoire; Cuba; Ethiopia; Finland; Malaysia; Romania; Yemen; Zaire

United Nations Security Council resolution 656, adopted unanimously on 8 June 1990, after recalling Resolution 654 (1990) and reviewing a report by the Secretary-General, the council decided to extend the tasks of monitoring the ceasefire, demobilising and separating the Contras and other forces of the resistance in Nicaragua until 29 June 1990.

The resolution urged all parties involved to maintain and increase the speed of demobilisation so that it could be completed by 29 June 1990. It also requested the Secretary-General to report back to the council by this date. Reporting back on 29 June, the Secretary-General informed the council that demobilisation had been completed the day before, and that the United Nations Observer Group in Central America had helped in the conflict in Nicaragua.

== See also ==
- History of Central America
- History of Nicaragua
- List of United Nations Security Council Resolutions 601 to 700 (1987–1991)
