= United Nations Security Council Resolution 638 =

UN Security Council Resolution 638
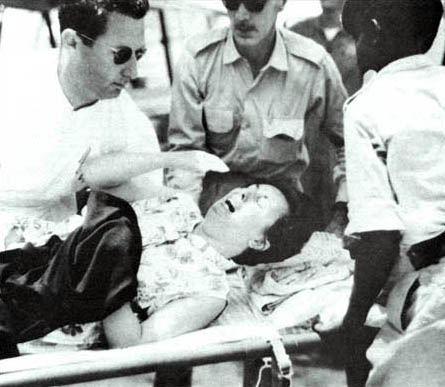
- Dragon Rouge hostage incident in the Congo (1965)
- Date: 31 July 1989
- Meeting no.: 2,872
- Code: S/RES/638 (Document)
- Subject: Hostage taking
- Voting summary: 15 voted for; None voted against; None abstained
- Result: Adopted

Security Council composition
- Permanent members: China; France; Soviet Union; United Kingdom; United States
- Non-permanent members: Algeria; Brazil; Canada; Colombia; Ethiopia; Finland; Malaysia; Nepal; Senegal; Yugoslavia

United Nations Security Council resolution 638, adopted unanimously on 31 July 1989, after reaffirming resolutions 579 (1985) and 618 (1988), the Council expressed its deep concern at the prevalence in incidents of hostage-taking having grave consequences for the international community and relations between states.

The Council recalled various General Assembly and other resolutions, condemning all incidents of hostage-taking and abductions and calling for the immediate safe release of hostages wherever they are. It also called on States to use their political influence, in accordance with the United Nations Charter, to secure the safe release of hostages and abducted persons.

The resolution also asked Member States not party to the International Convention Against the Taking of Hostages to become party to it and other treaties. Finally, the Council urged greater cooperation in devising and adopting effective measures in accordance with international law to facilitate the prosecution, prevention and punishment of all acts of hostage taking as "manifestations of international terrorism".

== See also ==
- List of hostage crises
- List of United Nations Security Council Resolutions 601 to 700 (1987–1991)
