= United Nations Security Council Resolution 646 =

UN Security Council Resolution 646
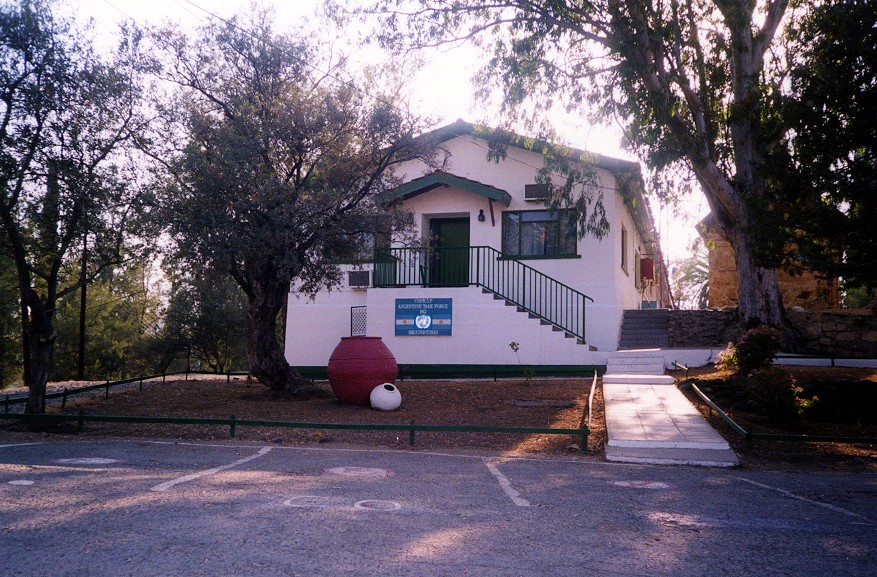
- UNFICYP building
- Date: 14 December 1989
- Meeting no.: 2,898
- Code: S/RES/646 (Document)
- Subject: Cyprus
- Voting summary: 15 voted for; None voted against; None abstained
- Result: Adopted

Security Council composition
- Permanent members: China; France; Soviet Union; United Kingdom; United States
- Non-permanent members: Algeria; Brazil; Canada; Colombia; Ethiopia; Finland; Malaysia; Nepal; Senegal; Yugoslavia

United Nations Security Council Resolution 646, adopted unanimously on December 14, 1989, noted a report of the Secretary-General that, due to the existing circumstances, the presence of the United Nations Peacekeeping Force in Cyprus (UNFICYP) would continue to be essential for a peaceful settlement. The Council expressed its desire for all parties to support the ten-point agreement for the resumption of intercommunal talks, and asked the Secretary-General to report back again before May 31, 1990, to follow the implementation of the resolution.

The Council reaffirmed its previous resolutions, including Resolution 365 (1974), expressed its concern over the situation, urged the involved parties to work together toward peace and once more extended the stationing of the Force in Cyprus, established in Resolution 186 (1964), until June 15, 1990.

== See also ==
- Cyprus dispute
- List of United Nations Security Council Resolutions 601 to 700 (1987–1991)
- United Nations Buffer Zone in Cyprus
- Turkish Invasion of Cyprus
