= United Nations Security Council Resolution 635 =

UN Security Council Resolution 635
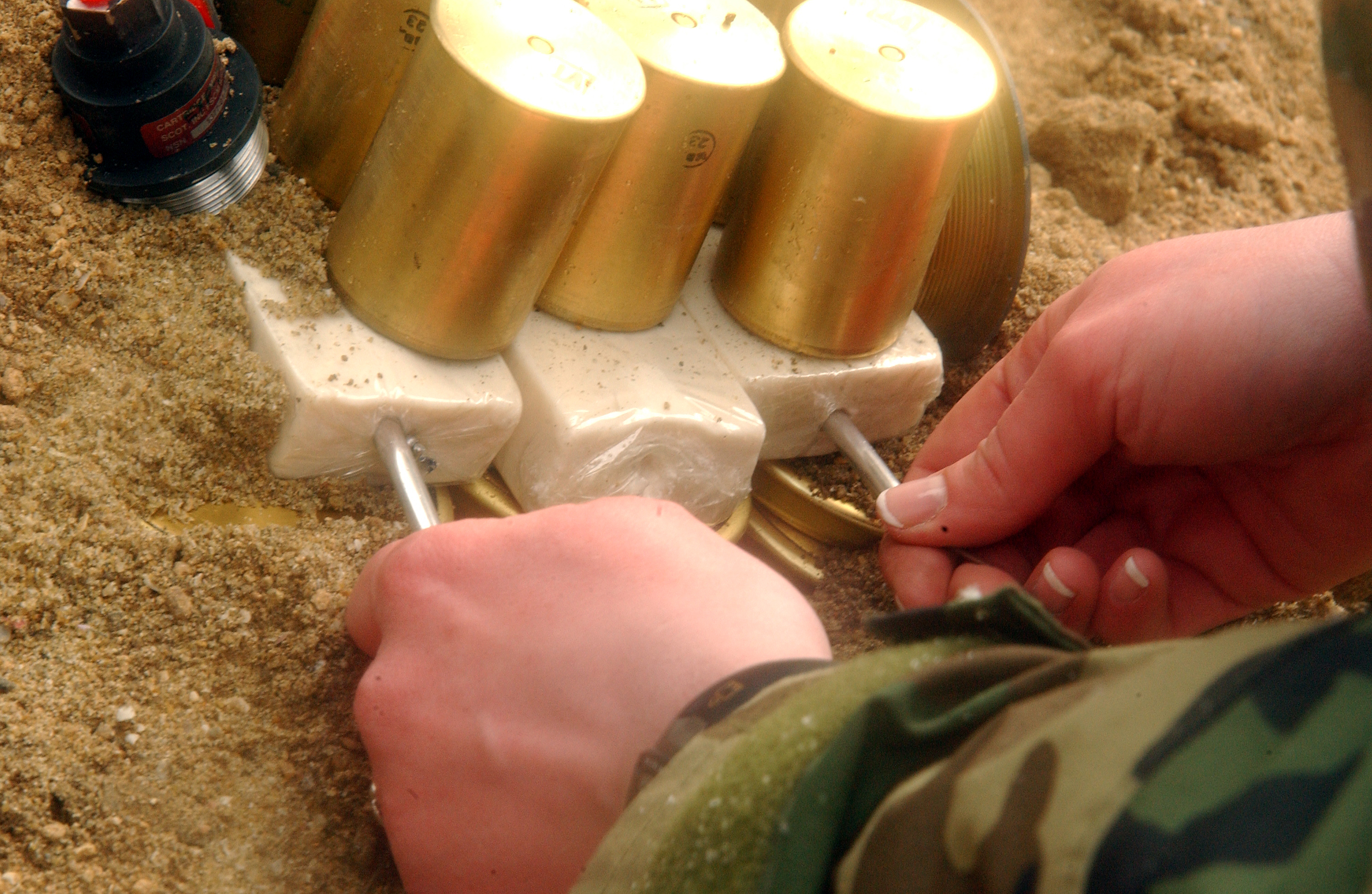
- Explosive devices
- Date: 14 June 1989
- Meeting no.: 2,869
- Code: S/RES/635 (Document)
- Subject: Marking of explosives
- Voting summary: 15 voted for; None voted against; None abstained
- Result: Adopted

Security Council composition
- Permanent members: China; France; Soviet Union; United Kingdom; United States
- Non-permanent members: Algeria; Brazil; Canada; Colombia; Ethiopia; Finland; Malaysia; Nepal; Senegal; Yugoslavia

United Nations Security Council resolution 635 was adopted unanimously on 14 June 1989, after taking note of an International Civil Aviation Organization (ICAO) resolution on 16 February 1989, and expressing its concern regarding incidents of terrorism on international air travel. Through the resolution, the Council condemned all acts of "unlawful interference" against the security of civil aviation, calling on all Member States to co-operate in devising and implementing ways to combat terrorism.

The Council then went on to welcome the work undertaken by the ICAO and other international organisations in their efforts to prevent international terrorism, particularly against civil aircraft. It also urged the organisations, as well as Member States and the producers of plastic or sheet explosives to intensify research into making such explosives easier to detect and in the prevention of international terrorism as a whole, further calling upon all states and organisations to share the results of the research.

== See also ==
- Anti-terrorism legislation
- List of terrorist incidents and aircraft hijackings
- List of United Nations Security Council Resolutions 601 to 700 (1987–1991)
