= United Nations Security Council Resolution 605 =

UN Security Council Resolution 605
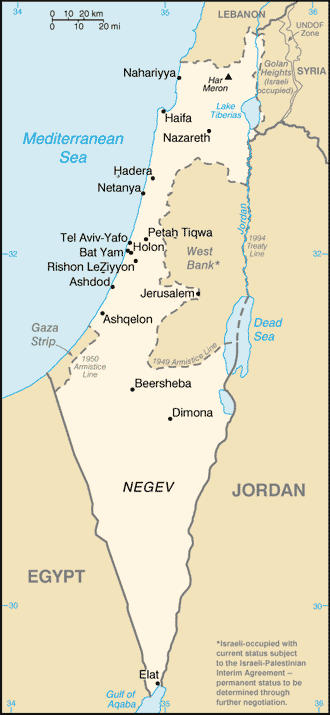
- Israel and the occupied territories
- Date: 22 December 1987
- Meeting no.: 2,777
- Code: S/RES/605 (Document)
- Subject: Territories occupied by Israel
- Voting summary: 14 voted for; None voted against; 1 abstained
- Result: Adopted

Security Council composition
- Permanent members: China; France; Soviet Union; United Kingdom; United States
- Non-permanent members: Argentina; Bulgaria; Congo; Ghana; Italy; Japan; United Arab Emirates; Venezuela; West Germany; Zambia

United Nations Security Council resolution 605, adopted on 22 December 1987, after hearing from a representative from South Yemen and recalling the Geneva Conventions and Security Council resolutions 446 (1979), 465 (1980), 497 (1981) and 592 (1986), the Council condemned Israel for violating the human rights of the Palestinian people and in particular the opening of fire and killing of students in the first few weeks of the First Intifada.

The resolution called upon Israel to desist from its policies in the occupied territories and to respect the Fourth Geneva Convention, urging maximum restraint to contribute towards the establishment of peace in the region. It also stressed the urgent need to reach a just, durable and peaceful settlement of the Arab–Israeli conflict as a whole.

The resolution requested the Secretary-General to examine the present situation and recommend ways for ensuring the safety and protection of the Palestinian civilians under occupation and to report back no later than 20 January 1988.

== Text of the resolution ==
The Security Council,

Having considered the letter dated 11 December 1987 from the Permanent Representative of Democratic Yemen to the United Nations, in his capacity as Chairman of the Arab Group for the month of December,

Bearing in mind the inalienable rights of all peoples recognized by the Charter of the United Nations and proclaimed by the Universal Declaration of Human Rights,

Recalling its relevant resolutions on the situation in the Palestinian and other Arab territories, occupied by Israel since 1967, including Jerusalem, and including its resolutions 446 (1979), 465 (1980), 497 (1981) and 592 (1986),

Recalling also the Geneva Convention relative to the Protection of Civilian Persons in Time of War, of 12 August 1949,

Gravely concerned and alarmed by the deteriorating situation in the Palestinian and other Arab territories occupied by Israel since 1967, including Jerusalem,

Taking into account the need to consider measures for the impartial protection of the Palestinian civilian population under Israeli occupation,

Considering that the current policies and practices of Israel, the occupying Power, in the occupied territories are bound to have grave consequences for the endeavours to achieve comprehensive, just and lasting peace in the Middle East,

1. Strongly deplores those policies and practices of Israel, the occupying Power, which violate the human rights of the Palestinian people in the occupied territories, and in particular the opening of fire by the Israeli army, resulting in the killing and wounding of defenceless Palestinian civilians;
2. Reaffirms that the Geneva Convention relative to the Protection of Civilian Persons in Time of War, of 12 August 1949, is applicable to the Palestinian and other Arab territories occupied by Israel since 1967, including Jerusalem;
3. Calls once again upon Israel, the occupying Power, to abide immediately and scrupulously by the Geneva Convention relative to the Protection of Civilian Persons in Time of War, of 12 August 1949, and to desist forthwith from its policies and practices that are in violation of the provisions of the Convention;
4. Calls furthermore for the exercise of the maximum restraint to contribute towards the establishment of peace;
5. Stresses the urgent need to reach a just, durable and peaceful settlement of the Arab–Israeli conflict;
6. Requests the Secretary-General to examine the present situation in the occupied territories by all means available to him, and to submit a report no later than 20 January 1988 containing his recommendations on ways and means for ensuring the safety and protection of the Palestinian civilians under Israeli occupation;
7. Decides to keep the situation in the Palestinian and other Arab territories occupied by Israeli since 1967, including Jerusalem, under review.

== Votes ==
The resolution was adopted by 14 votes to none against, with one abstention from the United States, which did so due to its "generalised criticism of Israeli policies and practices" while ignoring Arab provocations which led to the incident.

== See also ==
- United Nations Security Council Resolution 607
- Arab–Israeli conflict
- First Intifada
- Israeli–Palestinian conflict
- List of United Nations Security Council Resolutions 601 to 700 (1987–1991)
