= United Nations Security Council Resolution 623 =

UN Security Council Resolution 623
- South Africa
- Date: 23 November 1988
- Meeting no.: 2,830
- Code: S/RES/623 (Document)
- Subject: South Africa
- Voting summary: 13 voted for; None voted against; 2 abstained
- Result: Adopted

Security Council composition
- Permanent members: China; France; Soviet Union; United Kingdom; United States
- Non-permanent members: Algeria; Argentina; Brazil; Italy; Japan; Nepal; Senegal; West Germany; Yugoslavia; Zambia

United Nations Security Council resolution 623, adopted on 23 November 1988, the Council noted with grave concern the death sentence imposed upon anti-apartheid activist Paul Tefo Setlaba, on the basis of "common purpose" in South Africa. The resolution at the meeting urgently called by Zambia strongly urged the Government of South Africa to commute Setlaba's sentence and stay his execution in order to further avoid aggravating the situation in South Africa.

Resolution 623 was adopted by 13 votes to none, with two abstentions from the United Kingdom and the United States. Explaining their abstentions, both countries said that while they opposed apartheid and the repression in South Africa as a result of it, they could not vote for the current resolution as Setlaba had admitted he was involved in the murder of another South African during the 1985 black consumer boycott.

On 25 November 1988, four and a half hours before the execution was to be carried out, Setlaba was granted a reprieve.

== See also ==
- Internal resistance to South African apartheid
- List of United Nations Security Council Resolutions 601 to 700 (1987–1991)
- South Africa under apartheid
