= United Nations Security Council Resolution 641 =

UN Security Council Resolution 641
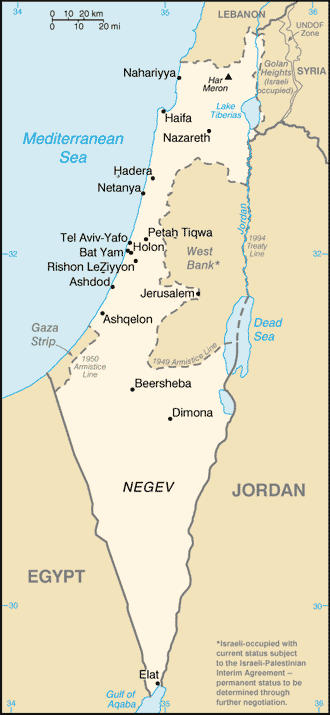
- Israel and the occupied territories
- Date: 30 August 1989
- Meeting no.: 2,883
- Code: S/RES/641 (Document)
- Subject: Territories occupied by Israel
- Voting summary: 14 voted for; None voted against; 1 abstained
- Result: Adopted

Security Council composition
- Permanent members: China; France; Soviet Union; United Kingdom; United States
- Non-permanent members: Algeria; Brazil; Canada; Colombia; Ethiopia; Finland; Malaysia; Nepal; Senegal; Yugoslavia

United Nations Security Council resolution 636, adopted on 30 August 1989, after reaffirming resolutions 608 (1988), 636 (1989) and learning of the deportation of five Palestinians by Israel in the occupied territories on 27 August 1989, the Council condemned the continued deportations and reaffirmed the applicability of the Fourth Geneva Convention referring to the protection of civilians in times of war.

The resolution also called upon Israel to ensure the safe and immediate return of those deported and to cease further deportations of civilians, which were usually expelled to Lebanon.

Resolution 641 was adopted with 14 votes to none, with one abstention from the United States.

== See also ==
- Arab–Israeli conflict
- First Intifada
- Israeli–Palestinian conflict
- List of United Nations Security Council Resolutions 601 to 700 (1987–1991)
