= United Nations Security Council Resolution 653 =

UN Security Council Resolution 653
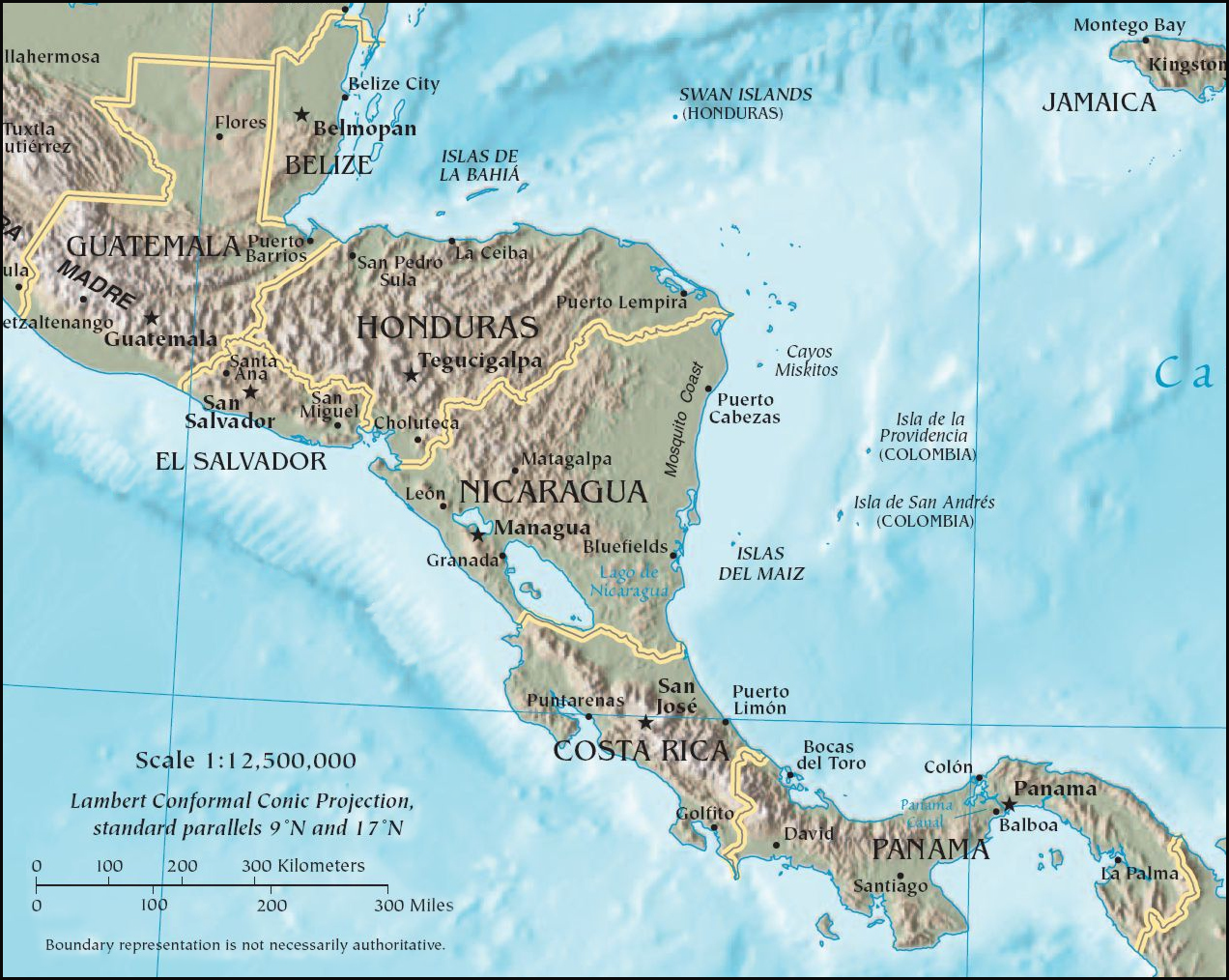
- Central America
- Date: 20 April 1990
- Meeting no.: 2,919
- Code: S/RES/653 (Document)
- Subject: Central America
- Voting summary: 15 voted for; None voted against; None abstained
- Result: Adopted

Security Council composition
- Permanent members: China; France; Soviet Union; United Kingdom; United States
- Non-permanent members: Canada; Colombia; Côte d'Ivoire; Cuba; Ethiopia; Finland; Malaysia; Romania; South Yemen; Zaire

United Nations Security Council resolution 653, adopted unanimously on 20 April 1990, after recalling resolutions 644 (1989) and 650 (1990), the council endorsed a report by the Secretary-General and authorised new additions to the mandate of the United Nations Observer Group in Central America.

The addition to the mandate, after discussions between the Government of Nicaragua and the Contras, included the proposal to create five "security zones" within Nicaragua within which the Contras would demobilise.

It also requested the Secretary-General to report back to the council before the end of the current mandate on 7 May 1990.

== See also ==
- History of Central America
- History of Nicaragua
- List of United Nations Security Council Resolutions 601 to 700 (1987–1991)
