= United Nations Security Council Resolution 649 =

UN Security Council Resolution 649
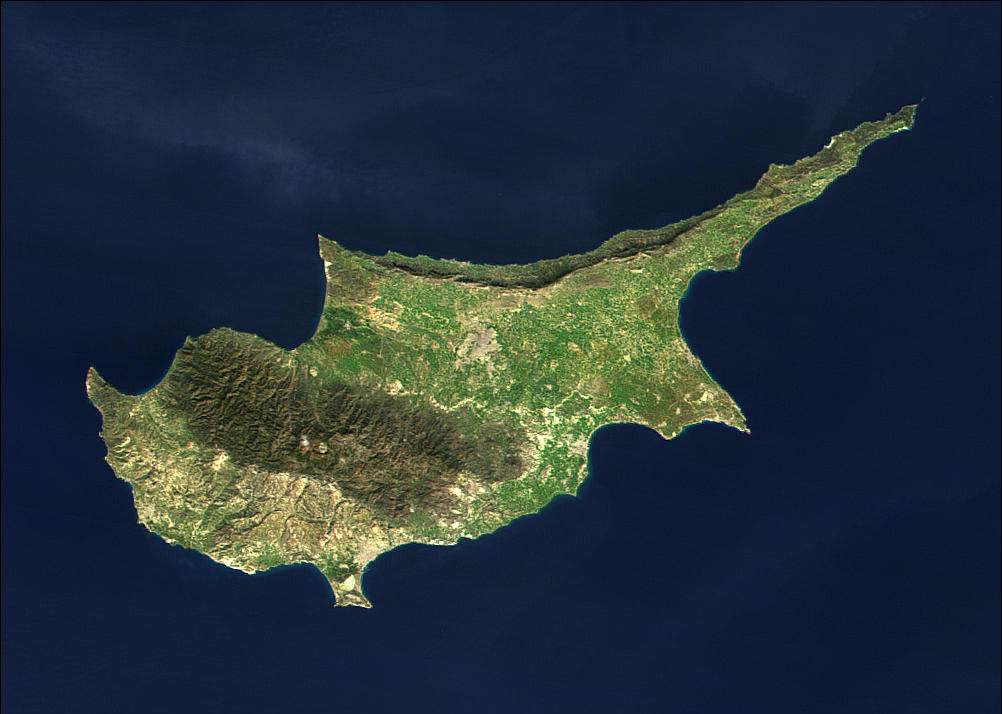
- Cyprus viewed from space
- Date: 12 March 1990
- Meeting no.: 2,909
- Code: S/RES/649 (Document)
- Subject: Cyprus
- Voting summary: 15 voted for; None voted against; None abstained
- Result: Adopted

Security Council composition
- Permanent members: China; France; Soviet Union; United Kingdom; United States
- Non-permanent members: Canada; Colombia; Côte d'Ivoire; Cuba; Ethiopia; Finland; Malaysia; Romania; South Yemen; Zaire

United Nations Security Council resolution 649, adopted unanimously on 12 March 1990, after noting a report of the secretary-general on a recent meeting between the leaders of the two communities in Cyprus and recalling Resolution 367 (1975), the council expressed its regret that, in the 25 years since the establishment of the United Nations Peacekeeping Force in Cyprus, a solution to the situation has not been found.

The council in particular reaffirmed meetings between the leaders of the Greek Cypriot and Turkish Cypriot communities in 1977 and 1979, in which they pledged to establish a bi-communal "Federal Republic of Cyprus". It urged both to pursue their efforts, along with the Secretary-General, to find a mutually acceptable solution for the establishment of a federation, calling on both to complete an overall agreement agreed to in 1989.

Resolution 649 requested the Secretary-General to make suggestions to both leaders to solve the situation and report back on the progress of the discussions by 31 May 1990.

== See also ==
- Cyprus dispute
- List of United Nations Security Council Resolutions 601 to 700 (1987–1991)
- United Nations Buffer Zone in Cyprus
- Turkish invasion of Cyprus
