= United Nations Security Council Resolution 627 =

UN Security Council Resolution 627
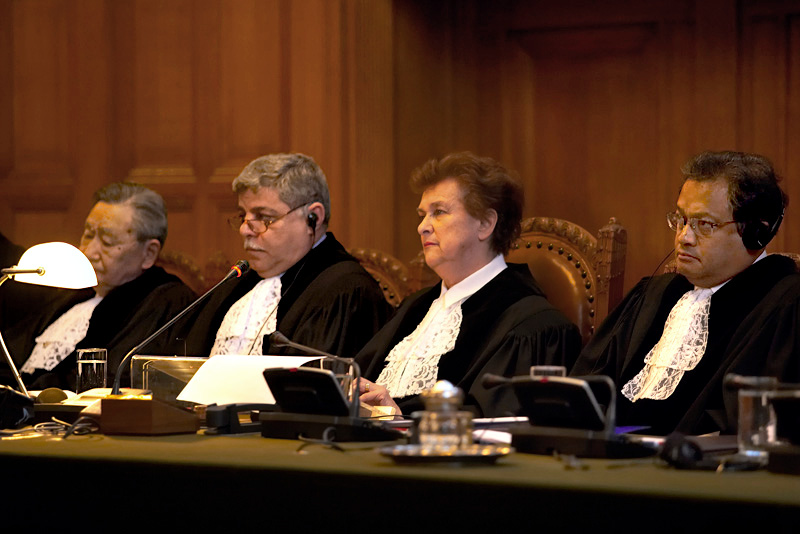
- International Court of Justice judges
- Date: 9 January 1989
- Meeting no.: 2,838
- Code: S/RES/624 (Document)
- Subject: International Court of Justice
- Voting summary: 15 voted for; None voted against; None abstained
- Result: Adopted

Security Council composition
- Permanent members: China; France; Soviet Union; United Kingdom; United States
- Non-permanent members: Algeria; Brazil; Canada; Colombia; Ethiopia; Finland; Malaysia; Nepal; Senegal; Yugoslavia

United Nations Security Council resolution 627, adopted unanimously on 9 January 1989, after noting the death of International Court of Justice (ICJ) President Nagendra Singh on 11 December 1988, the council decided that elections to the vacancy on the ICJ would take place on 18 April 1989 at the Security Council and at the General Assembly's 43rd session.

Singh had been a member of the court since 6 February 1973, having been its vice-president from 1976 to 1979 and its president from 1985 to 1988.

== See also ==
- Judges of the International Court of Justice
- List of United Nations Security Council Resolutions 601 to 700 (1987–1991)
