= United Nations Security Council Resolution 648 =

UN Security Council Resolution 648
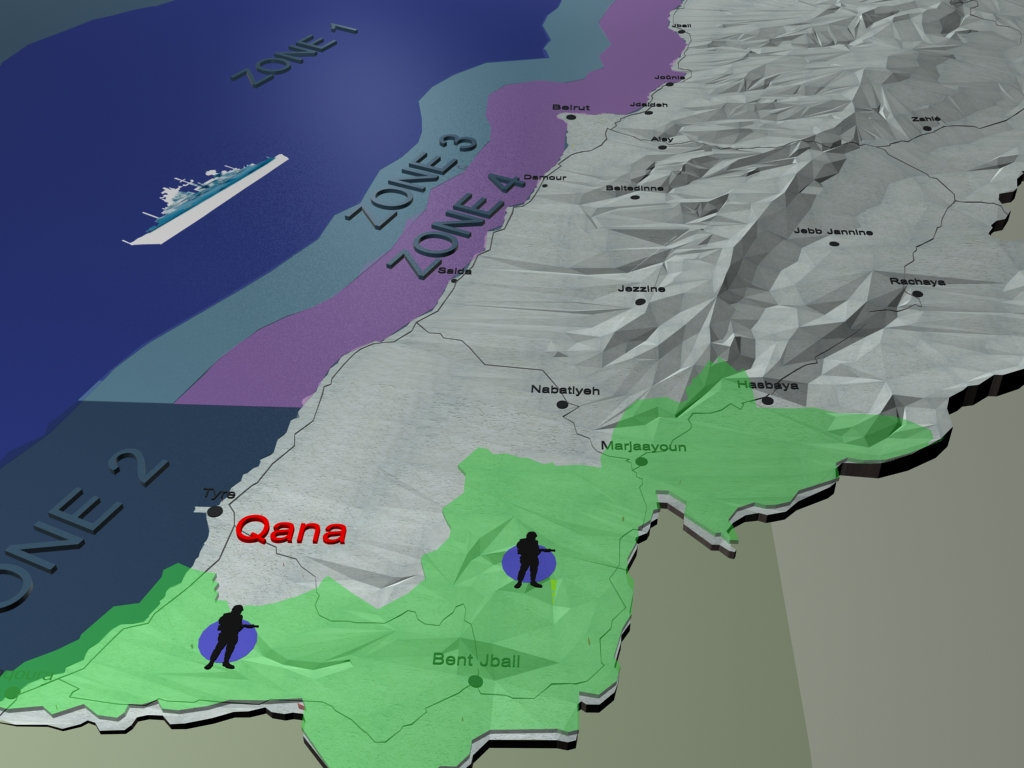
- UNIFIL area of operations
- Date: 31 January 1990
- Meeting no.: 2,906
- Code: S/RES/648 (Document)
- Subject: Israel–Lebanon
- Voting summary: 15 voted for; None voted against; None abstained
- Result: Adopted

Security Council composition
- Permanent members: China; France; Soviet Union; United Kingdom; United States
- Non-permanent members: Canada; Colombia; Côte d'Ivoire; Cuba; Ethiopia; Finland; Malaysia; Romania; South Yemen; Zaire

United Nations Security Council resolution 648, adopted unanimously on 31 January 1990, after recalling previous resolutions on the topic, as well as studying the report by the Secretary-General on the United Nations Interim Force in Lebanon (UNIFIL) approved in 426 (1978), the Council decided to extend the mandate of UNIFIL for a further six months until 31 July 1990.

The Council then reemphasised the mandate of the Force and requested the Secretary-General to report back on the progress made with regard to the implementation of resolutions 425 (1978) and 426 (1978).

== See also ==
- Israeli–Lebanese conflict
- Lebanese Civil War
- List of United Nations Security Council Resolutions 601 to 700 (1987–1991)
- South Lebanon conflict (1985–2000)
