= United Nations Security Council Resolution 630 =

1989 UN Security Council resolution

UN Security Council Resolution 630
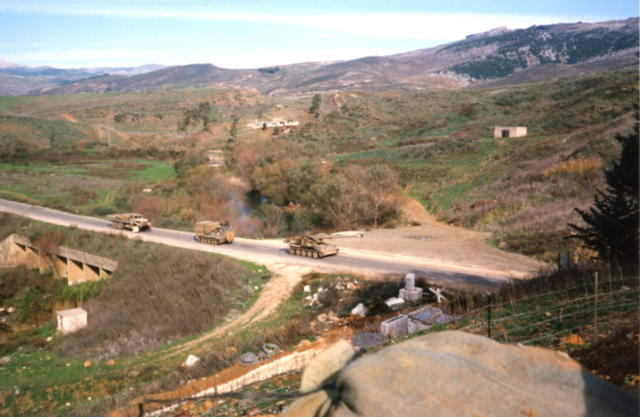
- UNIFIL post (1988)
- Date: 30 January 1989
- Meeting no.: 2,843
- Code: S/RES/630 (Document)
- Subject: Israel–Lebanon
- Voting summary: 15 voted for; None voted against; None abstained
- Result: Adopted

Security Council composition
- Permanent members: China; France; Soviet Union; United Kingdom; United States
- Non-permanent members: Algeria; Brazil; Canada; Colombia; Ethiopia; Finland; Malaysia; Nepal; Senegal; Yugoslavia

United Nations Security Council resolution 630, adopted unanimously on 30 January 1989, after recalling previous resolutions on the topic, as well as studying the report by the Secretary-General on the United Nations Interim Force in Lebanon (UNIFIL) approved in 426 (1978), the Council decided to extend the mandate of UNIFIL for a further six months until 31 July 1989.

The Council then reemphasised the mandate of the Force and requested the Secretary-General to report back on the progress made with regard to the implementation of resolutions 425 (1978) and 426 (1978).

== See also ==
- Israeli–Lebanese conflict
- Lebanese Civil War
- List of United Nations Security Council Resolutions 601 to 700 (1987–1991)
- South Lebanon conflict (1985–2000)
