= United Nations Security Council Resolution 682 =

UN Security Council Resolution 682
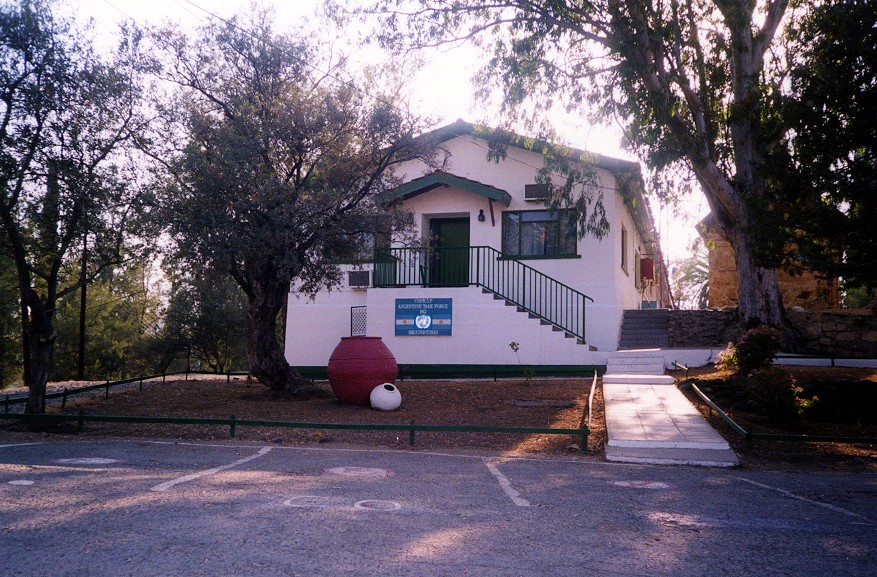
- UNFICYP base
- Date: 21 December 1990
- Meeting no.: 2,971
- Code: S/RES/682 (Document)
- Subject: Cyprus
- Voting summary: 15 voted for; None voted against; None abstained
- Result: Adopted

Security Council composition
- Permanent members: China; France; Soviet Union; United Kingdom; United States
- Non-permanent members: Canada; Colombia; Côte d'Ivoire; Cuba; Ethiopia; Finland; Malaysia; Romania; Yemen; Zaire

United Nations Security Council resolution 682, adopted unanimously on 21 December 1990, after recalling Resolution 186 (1964) and all resolutions on Cyprus up to the most recent Resolution 680 (1990), the Council expressed its concern regarding the "chronic and ever-deepening financial crisis" facing the United Nations Peacekeeping Force in Cyprus.

In this regard, the current resolution decided to examine the problems of financing the Force and would report back by 1 June 1991 on the matter, with the view to putting into effect an alternative method of financing the Force. Members of the Council did not consider withdrawing the Force from the island, noting its necessity as a valuable peacekeeping mission.

== See also ==
- Cyprus dispute
- List of United Nations Security Council Resolutions 601 to 700 (1987–1991)
- United Nations Buffer Zone in Cyprus
- Turkish invasion of Cyprus
