= United Nations Security Council Resolution 652 =

UN Security Council Resolution 652
- Location of Namibia
- Date: 17 April 1990
- Meeting no.: 2,918
- Code: S/RES/652 (Document)
- Subject: Admission of new Members to the UN: Namibia
- Voting summary: 15 voted for; None voted against; None abstained
- Result: Adopted

Security Council composition
- Permanent members: China; France; Soviet Union; United Kingdom; United States
- Non-permanent members: Canada; Colombia; Côte d'Ivoire; Cuba; Ethiopia; Finland; Malaysia; Romania; South Yemen; Zaire

United Nations Security Council resolution 652, adopted unanimously on 17 April 1990, after examining the application of the Republic of Namibia for membership in the United Nations, the Council recommended to the General Assembly that Namibia be admitted.

Namibia became the 160th member of the United Nations on 23 April 1990, after being a German colony and ruled by South Africa under its mandate of South West Africa for 75 years. The United States ambassador Thomas R. Pickering said on the passing of the resolution, "Namibia's birth has been protracted and difficult, but it now appears that the star under which she comes into the world shines brightly."

== See also ==
- Member states of the United Nations
- List of United Nations Security Council Resolutions 601 to 700 (1987–1991)
- Namibian War of Independence
- Tripartite Accord
