= United Nations Security Council Resolution 628 =

UN Security Council Resolution addressing the Cuban intervention in Angola

UN Security Council Resolution 628
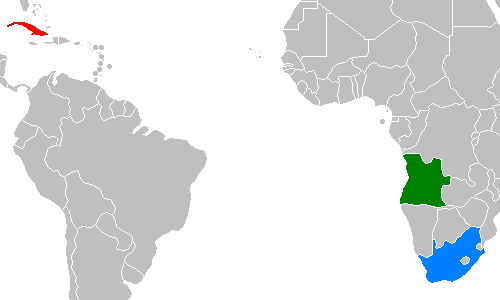
- Cuba (red), Angola (green) and South Africa (blue)
- Date: 16 January 1989
- Meeting no.: 2,842
- Code: S/RES/628 (Document)
- Subject: Angola
- Voting summary: 15 voted for; None voted against; None abstained
- Result: Adopted

Security Council composition
- Permanent members: China; France; Soviet Union; United Kingdom; United States
- Non-permanent members: Algeria; Brazil; Canada; Colombia; Ethiopia; Finland; Malaysia; Nepal; Senegal; Yugoslavia

United Nations Security Council resolution 628, adopted unanimously on 16 January 1989, after noting an agreement between Angola and Cuba regarding the withdrawal of Cuban troops from Angola, and the tripartite agreement between Angola, Cuba, and South Africa; the Council welcomed both agreements, emphasizing the importance of both in terms of international peace and security.

The resolution expressed its full support to the agreements and called for all parties concerned and other Member States to help implement the resolution. It also asked for the Secretary General Javier Pérez de Cuéllar to keep the Council informed on its implementation.

== See also ==
- Angolan Civil War
- Brazzaville Protocol
- Angola–South Africa relations
- Cuban intervention in Angola
- List of United Nations Security Council Resolutions 601 to 700 (1987–1991)
- South African Border Wars
- Apartheid
