= United Nations Security Council Resolution 579 =

UN Security Council Resolution 579
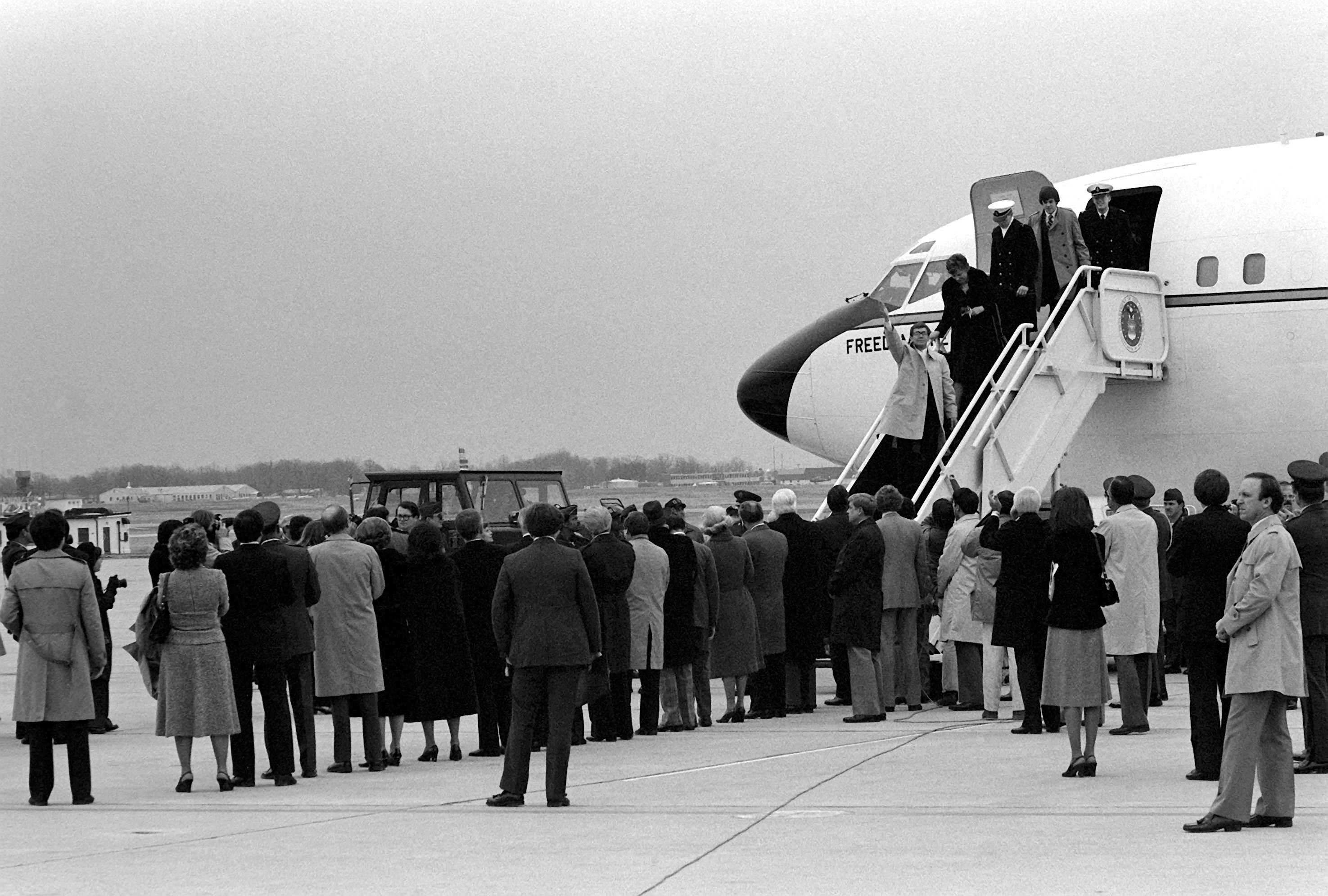
- American hostages returning from Iran
- Date: 18 December 1985
- Meeting no.: 2,637
- Code: S/RES/579 (Document)
- Subject: Hostage taking
- Voting summary: 15 voted for; None voted against; None abstained
- Result: Adopted

Security Council composition
- Permanent members: China; France; Soviet Union; United Kingdom; United States
- Non-permanent members: Australia; Burkina Faso; Denmark; Egypt; India; Madagascar; Peru; Thailand; Trinidad and Tobago; Ukrainian SSR

United Nations Security Council resolution 579, adopted unanimously on 18 December 1985, in a meeting called by the United States, the Council expressed its deep concern at the prevalence in incidents of hostage-taking having grave consequences for the international community and relations between states.

The Council recalled various General Assembly and other resolutions, condemning all incidents of hostage-taking and abductions and calling for the immediate safe release of hostages wherever they are. It also affirmed the responsibility of Member States in whose territory hostages are being held to take all appropriate measures to secure the safe release of hostages.

The resolution also asked Member States not party to the International Convention Against the Taking of Hostages to become party to it and other treaties. Finally, the Council urged greater cooperation in devising and adopting effective measures in accordance with international law to facilitate the prosecution, prevention and punishment of all acts of hostage taking as "manifestations of international terrorism".

== See also ==
- List of hostage crises
- List of United Nations Security Council Resolutions 501 to 600 (1982–1987)
- United Nations Security Council Resolution 638
