= United Nations Security Council Resolution 636 =

UN Security Council Resolution 636
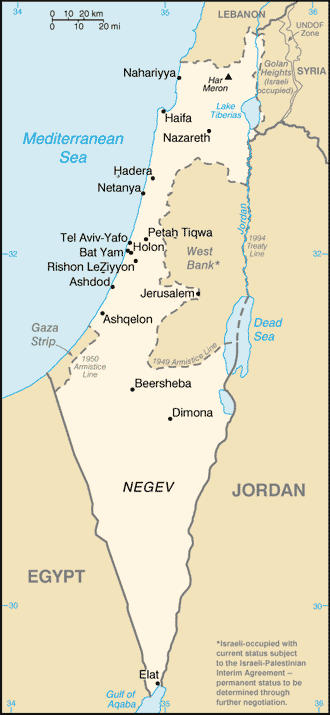
- Israel and the occupied territories
- Date: 6 July 1989
- Meeting no.: 2,870
- Code: S/RES/636 (Document)
- Subject: Territories occupied by Israel
- Voting summary: 14 voted for; None voted against; 1 abstained
- Result: Adopted

Security Council composition
- Permanent members: China; France; Soviet Union; United Kingdom; United States
- Non-permanent members: Algeria; Brazil; Canada; Colombia; Ethiopia; Finland; Malaysia; Nepal; Senegal; Yugoslavia

United Nations Security Council resolution 636, adopted on 6 July 1989, after reaffirming resolutions 608 (1988) and 609 (1988) and learning of the deportation of eight Palestinians by Israel in the occupied territories on 29 June 1989, the council condemned the continued deportations and reaffirmed the applicability of the Fourth Geneva Convention referring to the protection of civilians in times of war.

The resolution also called upon Israel to ensure the safe and immediate return of those deported and to cease further deportations of civilians. The situation itself was brought to the council's attention by Syria and the President of the Security Council at the time, Yugoslavia.

Resolution 636 was adopted with 14 votes to none, with one abstention from the United States.

== See also ==
- Arab–Israeli conflict
- First Intifada
- Israeli–Palestinian conflict
- List of United Nations Security Council Resolutions 601 to 700 (1987–1991)
