= United Nations Security Council Resolution 650 =

United Nations Security Council resolution

UN Security Council Resolution 650
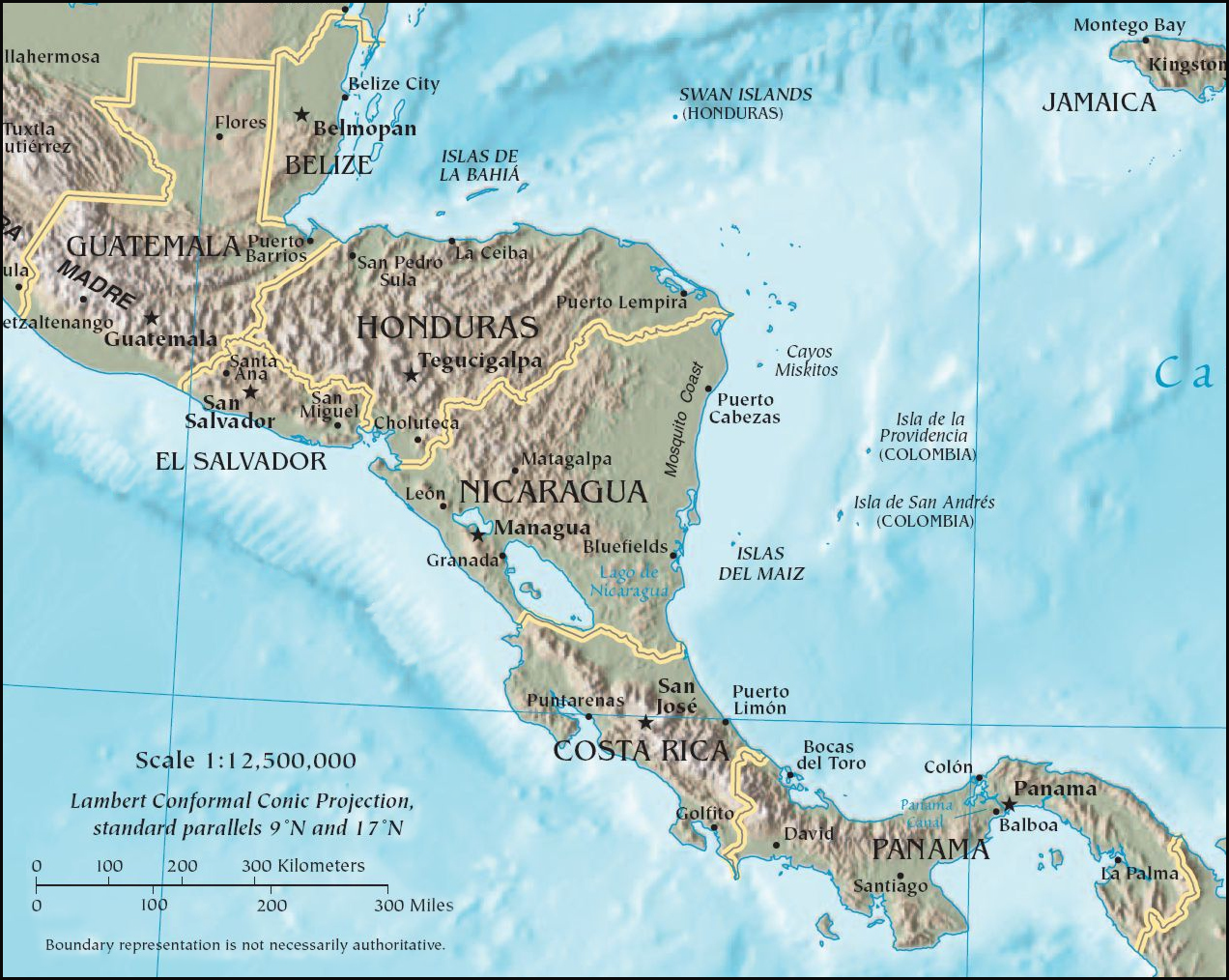
- Central America
- Date: 27 March 1990
- Meeting no.: 2,913
- Code: S/RES/650 (Document)
- Subject: Central America
- Voting summary: 15 voted for; None voted against; None abstained
- Result: Adopted

Security Council composition
- Permanent members: China; France; Soviet Union; United Kingdom; United States
- Non-permanent members: Canada; Colombia; Côte d'Ivoire; Cuba; Ethiopia; Finland; Malaysia; Romania; South Yemen; Zaire

United Nations Security Council Resolution 650 was adopted unanimously on 27 March 1990. After recalling resolutions 637 (1989) and 644 (1989), the Security Council endorsed the report by the Secretary-General and decided to authorise an enlargement of the United Nations Observer Group in Central America (ONUCA) in order to demobilise the Contras in Nicaragua.

The size of ONUCA was increased by an additional 800 personnel, including the addition of a Venezuelan combat battalion and security to oversee weapons disposal in Honduras. It also authorized the addition of armed personnel to its ranks and requested that the Secretary-General keep the Council updated on the resolution's implementation.

== See also ==
- History of Central America
- List of United Nations Security Council Resolutions 601 to 700 (1987–1991)
