= United Nations Security Council Resolution 607 =

UN Security Council Resolution 607
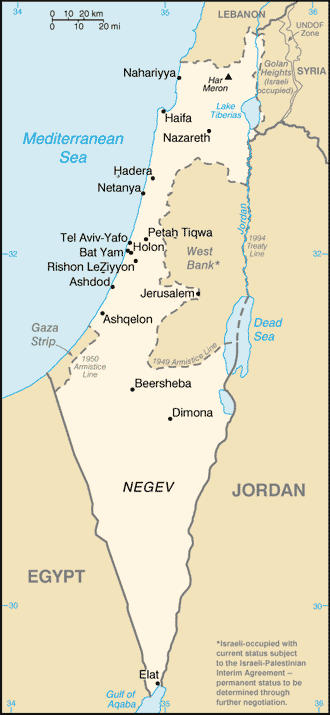
- Israel and the occupied territories
- Date: 5 January 1988
- Meeting no.: 2,780
- Code: S/RES/607 (Document)
- Subject: Territories occupied by Israel
- Voting summary: 15 voted for; None voted against; None abstained
- Result: Adopted

Security Council composition
- Permanent members: China; France; Soviet Union; United Kingdom; United States
- Non-permanent members: Algeria; Argentina; Brazil; Italy; Japan; Nepal; Senegal; West Germany; Yugoslavia; Zambia

United Nations Security Council resolution 607, adopted unanimously on 5 January 1988, after recalling Resolution 605 (1987) and being informed of the decision of Israel to continue deportations of Palestinians in the occupied territories, the council reaffirmed the applicability of the Fourth Geneva Convention referring to the protection of civilians in times of war.

The resolution called upon Israel to cease the deportations and abide by its obligations arising from the Geneva Conventions. The council also decided to keep the situation under review.

== See also ==
- Arab–Israeli conflict
- First Intifada
- Israeli–Palestinian conflict
- List of United Nations Security Council Resolutions 601 to 700 (1987–1991)
- United Nations Security Council Resolution 608
