= United Nations Security Council Resolution 694 =

UN Security Council Resolution 694
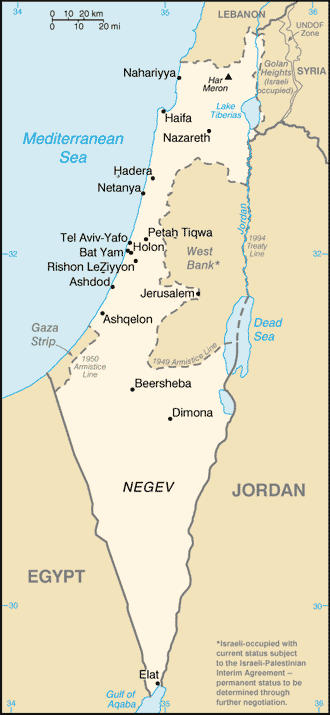
- Israel and the occupied territories
- Date: 24 May 1991
- Meeting no.: 2,989
- Code: S/RES/694 (Document)
- Subject: Territories occupied by Israel
- Voting summary: 15 voted for; None voted against; None abstained
- Result: Adopted

Security Council composition
- Permanent members: China; France; Soviet Union; United Kingdom; United States
- Non-permanent members: Austria; Belgium; Côte d'Ivoire; Cuba; Ecuador; India; Romania; Yemen; Zaire; Zimbabwe

United Nations Security Council resolution 694, adopted unanimously on 24 May 1991, after reaffirming Resolution 681 (1990) and learning of the deportation of four Palestinians by Israel in the occupied territories on 18 May 1991, the Council condemned the deportations that were in violation of the Fourth Geneva Convention referring to the protection of civilians in times of war.

The resolution deplored the action and reiterated that Israel should refrain from deporting any more Palestinians and ensure the safe and immediate return of those deported.

== See also ==
- Arab–Israeli conflict
- First Intifada
- Israeli–Palestinian conflict
- List of United Nations Security Council Resolutions 601 to 700 (1987–1991)
