= United Nations Security Council Resolution 631 =

UN Security Council Resolution 631
- Iraq (orange) and Iran (green)
- Date: 8 February 1989
- Meeting no.: 2,844
- Code: S/RES/631 (Document)
- Subject: Iran–Iraq
- Voting summary: 15 voted for; None voted against; None abstained
- Result: Adopted

Security Council composition
- Permanent members: China; France; Soviet Union; United Kingdom; United States
- Non-permanent members: Algeria; Brazil; Canada; Colombia; Ethiopia; Finland; Malaysia; Nepal; Senegal; Yugoslavia

United Nations Security Council resolution 631, adopted unanimously on 8 February 1989, after recalling resolutions 598 (1987) and 618 (1988) and having considered a report by the Secretary-General Javier Pérez de Cuéllar on the United Nations Iran–Iraq Military Observer Group, the Council decided:

(a) to call on both Iran and Iraq to implement Resolution 598;
(b) to renew the mandate of the United Nations Iran–Iraq Military Observer Group for another seven months and twenty-two days until 30 September 1989;
(c) to request the Secretary-General to report on the situation and the measures taken to implement Resolution 598 at the end of this period.

== See also ==
- Iran–Iraq relations
- Iran–Iraq War
- List of United Nations Security Council Resolutions 601 to 700 (1987–1991)
