= United Nations Security Council Resolution 618 =

UN Security Council Resolution 618
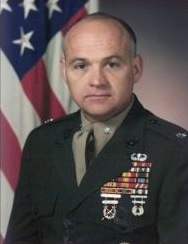
- Lieutenant-Colonel William R. Higgins
- Date: 29 July 1988
- Meeting no.: 2,822
- Code: S/RES/618 (Document)
- Subject: Israel–Lebanon
- Voting summary: 15 voted for; None voted against; None abstained
- Result: Adopted

Security Council composition
- Permanent members: China; France; Soviet Union; United Kingdom; United States
- Non-permanent members: Algeria; Argentina; Brazil; Italy; Japan; Nepal; Senegal; West Germany; Yugoslavia; Zambia

United Nations Security Council resolution 618, adopted unanimously on 29 July 1988, after recalling Resolution 579 (1985) on hostage-taking, the Council condemned the abduction of Lieutenant-Colonel William R. Higgins and demanded his immediate release. It also urged Member States to use their influence to promote the implementation of the current resolution.

The resolution was not implemented, and Higgins was later murdered by his captors.

== See also ==
- Israeli–Lebanese conflict
- Lebanese Civil War
- List of United Nations Security Council Resolutions 601 to 700 (1987–1991)
- South Lebanon conflict (1985–2000)
