= United Nations Security Council Resolution 608 =

UN Security Council Resolution 608
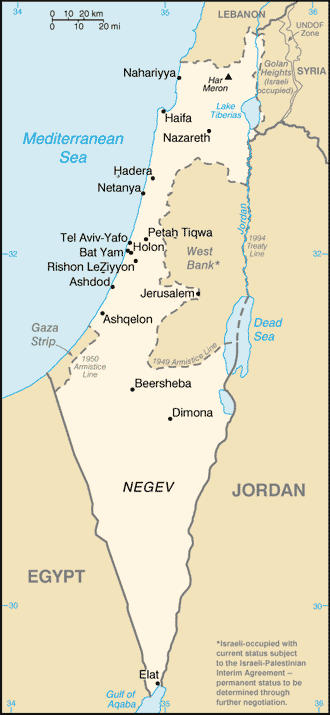
- Israel and the occupied territories
- Date: 14 January 1988
- Meeting no.: 2,781
- Code: S/RES/608 (Document)
- Subject: Territories occupied by Israel
- Voting summary: 14 voted for; None voted against; 1 abstained
- Result: Adopted

Security Council composition
- Permanent members: China; France; Soviet Union; United Kingdom; United States
- Non-permanent members: Algeria; Argentina; Brazil; Italy; Japan; Nepal; Senegal; West Germany; Yugoslavia; Zambia

United Nations Security Council Resolution 608, adopted on 14 January 1988, after recalling Resolution 607 (1988), the Council expressed regret at Israel's decision to deport Palestinians in the occupied territories in defiance of the previous resolution on the topic.

The resolution called upon Israel to cease the deportations and ensure the safe repatriation of Palestinians back to the Palestinian territories, deciding to keep the situation under review.

== Text of the resolution ==
The Security Council,

Reaffirming its resolution 607 (1988) of 5 January 1988,

Expressing its deep regret that Israel, the occupying Power, has, in defiance of that resolution, deported Palestinian civilians,

1. Calls upon Israel to rescind the order to deport Palestinian civilians and to ensure the safe and immediate return to the occupied Palestinian territories of those already deported;

2. Requests that Israel desist forthwith from deporting any other Palestinian civilians from the occupied territories;

3. Decides to keep the situation in the Palestinian and other Arab territories occupied by Israel since 1967, including Jerusalem, under review.

== Votes ==
Resolution 608 was adopted by 14 votes to none, with one abstention from the United States.

== See also ==
- Arab–Israeli conflict
- First Intifada
- Israeli–Palestinian conflict
- List of United Nations Security Council Resolutions 601 to 700 (1987–1991)
