= United Nations Iran–Iraq Military Observer Group =

United Nations commission (1988–1991)

Iraq (orange) and Iran (green)

The United Nations Iran–Iraq Military Observer Group (UNIIMOG) was a United Nations commission created during the Iran–Iraq War by the United Nations Security Council in Resolution 619 of August 9, 1988. The withdrawal of UNIIMOG forces in 1991 marked the official end to the Iran–Iraq War.

== Mission statement ==
The goal of UNIIMOG was to monitor, since August 1988, the armistice held between both parties, which was drawn following Security Council Resolution 598 of July 20, 1987. A personal representative of the UN Secretary-General secured the implementation of the UN resolution, and Brigadier General Anam Khan, from Bangladesh, stood as the highest military observer on both sides.

According to the UN, "UNIIMOG was established in August 1988 to verify, confirm and supervise the ceasefire and the withdrawal of all forces to the internationally recognized boundaries, pending a comprehensive settlement. UNIMOG was terminated in February 1991 after Iran and Iraq had fully withdrawn their forces to the internationally recognized boundaries."

== Countries involved ==
Troops were deployed by Argentina, Australia, Bangladesh, Denmark, Finland, Ghana, India, Indonesia, Ireland, Italy, SFR Yugoslavia, Canada, Kenya, Malaysia, New Zealand, Nigeria, Norway, Austria, Peru, Poland, Zambia, Sweden, Senegal, Turkey, Hungary and Uruguay.

One military personnel died during the UNIIMOG mission.
