= United Nations Security Council Resolution 36 =

United Nations Security Council resolution

UN Security Council Resolution 36
- Date: November 1 1947
- Meeting no.: 219
- Code: S/597 (Document)
- Subject: The Indonesian question
- Voting summary: 7 voted for; 1 voted against; 3 abstained
- Result: Adopted

Security Council composition
- Permanent members: China; France; Soviet Union; United Kingdom; United States
- Non-permanent members: Australia; Belgium; Brazil; Colombia; Poland; Syria

United Nations Security Council Resolution 36 was adopted on 1 November 1947. According to a report from the Consular Commission, Resolution 27 had not been fully effective and neither side had made an attempt to comply with the resolution. The Council called upon the parties involved in the Indonesian National Revolution (Indonesia and the Netherlands) to implement the ceasefire agreed upon according to Resolution 30.

Resolution 36 passed with seven votes to one. Poland voted against. Colombia, the Soviet Union, and Syria abstained. It was the first substantive resolution adopted over a negative vote, after resolution 34 bypassed a prospective veto on procedural grounds.

== See also ==
- Dutch colonial empire
- Australia and the United Nations
- Indonesia and the United Nations
- United Nations Security Council Resolution 31
- United Nations Security Council Resolution 32
- United Nations Security Council Resolution 35
- United Nations Security Council Resolution 40
- United Nations Security Council Resolution 41
- United Nations Security Council Resolution 55
- United Nations Security Council Resolution 63
- United Nations Security Council Resolution 64
- United Nations Security Council Resolution 65
- United Nations Security Council Resolution 67
- List of United Nations Security Council Resolutions 1 to 100 (1946–1953)
