= United Nations Security Council Resolution 27 =

United Nations Security Council resolution

UN Security Council Resolution 27
- Date: August 1 1947
- Meeting no.: 173
- Code: S/459 (Document)
- Subject: The Indonesian question
- Result: Adopted

Security Council composition
- Permanent members: China; France; Soviet Union; United Kingdom; United States
- Non-permanent members: Australia; Belgium; Brazil; Colombia; Poland; Syria

United Nations Security Council Resolution 27 was adopted on 1 August 1947. The Council called for a ceasefire and a peaceful resolution between the parties from the Netherlands and Indonesia involved in the Indonesian National Revolution.

The resolution was adopted in parts. No vote was taken on the text as a whole.

== See also ==
- Dutch colonial empire
- Indonesia and the United Nations
- United Nations Security Council Resolution 30
- United Nations Security Council Resolution 31
- United Nations Security Council Resolution 32
- United Nations Security Council Resolution 35
- United Nations Security Council Resolution 36
- United Nations Security Council Resolution 40
- United Nations Security Council Resolution 41
- United Nations Security Council Resolution 55
- United Nations Security Council Resolution 63
- United Nations Security Council Resolution 64
- United Nations Security Council Resolution 65
- United Nations Security Council Resolution 67
