= United Nations Security Council Resolution 32 =

United Nations Security Council resolution

UN Security Council Resolution 32
- Date: August 26 1947
- Meeting no.: 195
- Code: S/525, III (Document)
- Subject: The Indonesian question
- Voting summary: 10 voted for; None voted against; 1 abstained
- Result: Adopted

Security Council composition
- Permanent members: China; France; Soviet Union; United Kingdom; United States
- Non-permanent members: Australia; Belgium; Brazil; Colombia; Poland; Syria

United Nations Security Council Resolution 32 was adopted on 26 August 1947. The Council formally reminded both sides of the Indonesian National Revolution (Indonesia and the Netherlands) to adhere to Resolution 27, which called for a ceasefire and peaceful resolution to the conflict.

Resolution 32 passed with ten votes to none. The United Kingdom abstained.

== See also ==
- Dutch colonial empire
- Indonesia and the United Nations
- United Nations Security Council Resolution 30
- United Nations Security Council Resolution 31
- United Nations Security Council Resolution 35
- United Nations Security Council Resolution 36
- United Nations Security Council Resolution 40
- United Nations Security Council Resolution 41
- United Nations Security Council Resolution 55
- United Nations Security Council Resolution 63
- United Nations Security Council Resolution 64
- United Nations Security Council Resolution 65
- United Nations Security Council Resolution 67
