= United Nations Security Council Resolution 35 =

United Nations Security Council resolution

UN Security Council Resolution 35
- Date: October 3 1947
- Meeting no.: 207
- Code: S/574 (Document)
- Subject: The Indonesian question
- Voting summary: 9 voted for; None voted against; 2 abstained
- Result: Adopted

Security Council composition
- Permanent members: China; France; Soviet Union; United Kingdom; United States
- Non-permanent members: Australia; Belgium; Brazil; Colombia; Poland; Syria

United Nations Security Council Resolution 35 was adopted on 3 October 1947. The Council requested that the Secretary-General convene the committee established by Resolution 31 (consisting of Australia, Belgium, and the United States).

Resolution 35 passed with nine votes to none. Poland and the Soviet Union abstained.

== See also ==
- Dutch colonial empire
- Australia and the United Nations
- Indonesia and the United Nations
- United Nations Security Council Resolution 27
- United Nations Security Council Resolution 30
- United Nations Security Council Resolution 32
- United Nations Security Council Resolution 36
- United Nations Security Council Resolution 40
- United Nations Security Council Resolution 41
- United Nations Security Council Resolution 55
- United Nations Security Council Resolution 63
- United Nations Security Council Resolution 64
- United Nations Security Council Resolution 65
- United Nations Security Council Resolution 67
- List of United Nations Security Council Resolutions 1 to 100 (1946–1953)
