= United Nations Security Council Resolution 30 =

United Nations Security Council resolution

UN Security Council Resolution 30
- Date: August 25 1947
- Meeting no.: 194
- Code: S/525, I (Document)
- Subject: The Indonesian question
- Voting summary: 7 voted for; None voted against; 4 abstained
- Result: Adopted

Security Council composition
- Permanent members: China; France; Soviet Union; United Kingdom; United States
- Non-permanent members: Australia; Belgium; Brazil; Colombia; Poland; Syria

United Nations Security Council Resolution 30 was adopted by on 25 August 1947. The parties from the Netherlands and Indonesia involved in the Indonesian National Revolution agreed to comply with Resolution 27. The Council requested that each member recall a diplomatic officer from Batavia for briefings on the situation.

Resolution 30 passed with seven votes to none. Colombia, Poland, the Soviet Union, and the United Kingdom abstained.

== See also ==
- Dutch colonial empire
- Indonesia and the United Nations
- United Nations Security Council Resolution 31
- United Nations Security Council Resolution 32
- United Nations Security Council Resolution 35
- United Nations Security Council Resolution 36
- United Nations Security Council Resolution 40
- United Nations Security Council Resolution 41
- United Nations Security Council Resolution 55
- United Nations Security Council Resolution 63
- United Nations Security Council Resolution 64
- United Nations Security Council Resolution 65
- United Nations Security Council Resolution 67
