= United Nations Security Council Resolution 41 =

1948 resolution on "The Indonesian question"

UN Security Council Resolution 41
- Date: 28 February 1948
- Meeting no.: 259
- Code: S/678 (Document)
- Subject: The Indonesian question
- Voting summary: 7 voted for; None voted against; 4 abstained
- Result: Adopted

Security Council composition
- Permanent members: China; France; Soviet Union; United Kingdom; United States
- Non-permanent members: Argentina; Belgium; Canada; Colombia; Syria; Ukrainian SSR

United Nations Security Council Resolution 41 was adopted on 28 February 1948. The Council commended the parties involved in the Indonesian National Revolution for their compliance with Resolution 27 in signing a truce agreement. The Council restated the offer made in Resolution 31 of a committee (consisting of Australia, Belgium, and the United States) to assist with the peaceful resolution of the conflict.

Resolution 41 passed with seven votes to none. Colombia, Syria, the Ukrainian Soviet Socialist Republic, and the Soviet Union abstained.

== See also ==
- United Nations Security Council Resolution 30
- United Nations Security Council Resolution 32
- United Nations Security Council Resolution 35
- United Nations Security Council Resolution 36
- United Nations Security Council Resolution 40
- United Nations Security Council Resolution 55
- United Nations Security Council Resolution 63
- United Nations Security Council Resolution 64
- United Nations Security Council Resolution 65
- United Nations Security Council Resolution 67
- List of United Nations Security Council Resolutions 1 to 100 (1946–1953)
