= United Nations Security Council Resolution 31 =

United Nations Security Council resolution

UN Security Council Resolution 31
- Date: August 25 1947
- Meeting no.: 194
- Code: S/525, II (Document)
- Subject: The Indonesian question
- Voting summary: 8 voted for; None voted against; 3 abstained
- Result: Adopted

Security Council composition
- Permanent members: China; France; Soviet Union; United Kingdom; United States
- Non-permanent members: Australia; Belgium; Brazil; Colombia; Poland; Syria

United Nations Security Council Resolution 31 was adopted on 25 August 1947. The Council formed a committee to assist in the peaceful resolution of the Indonesian National Revolution.

The committee consisted of Australia (selected by Indonesia), Belgium (selected by the Netherlands), and the United States.

Resolution 31 passed with eight votes to none. Poland, Syria and the Soviet Union abstained.

== See also ==
- Dutch colonial empire
- Australia and the United Nations
- Indonesia and the United Nations
- United Nations Security Council Resolution 27
- United Nations Security Council Resolution 30
- United Nations Security Council Resolution 32
- United Nations Security Council Resolution 35
- United Nations Security Council Resolution 36
- United Nations Security Council Resolution 40
- United Nations Security Council Resolution 41
- United Nations Security Council Resolution 55
- United Nations Security Council Resolution 63
- United Nations Security Council Resolution 64
- United Nations Security Council Resolution 65
- United Nations Security Council Resolution 67
