= United Nations Security Council Resolution 55 =

UN Security Council Resolution 55
- Date: July 29 1948
- Meeting no.: 342
- Code: S/933 (Document)
- Subject: The Indonesian Question
- Voting summary: 9 voted for; None voted against; 2 abstained
- Result: Adopted

Security Council composition
- Permanent members: China; France; Soviet Union; United Kingdom; United States
- Non-permanent members: Argentina; Belgium; Canada; Colombia; Syria; Ukrainian SSR

United Nations Security Council Resolution 55, adopted on July 29, 1948, having receiving a report from the Committee of Good Offices about a standstill in political and trade negotiations in Indonesia, the Council called upon the governments of the Netherlands and the Republic of Indonesia to maintain strict observance of both the military and economic elements of the Renville Agreement and to implement early and fully its twelve political principles.

The resolution was adopted with nine votes to none; the Ukrainian SSR and Soviet Union abstained.

== See also ==
- Dutch colonial empire
- Australia and the United Nations
- Indonesia and the United Nations
- United Nations Security Council Resolution 27
- United Nations Security Council Resolution 31
- United Nations Security Council Resolution 32
- United Nations Security Council Resolution 35
- United Nations Security Council Resolution 40
- United Nations Security Council Resolution 41
- United Nations Security Council Resolution 63
- United Nations Security Council Resolution 64
- United Nations Security Council Resolution 65
- United Nations Security Council Resolution 67
- List of United Nations Security Council Resolutions 1 to 100 (1946–1953)
