= United Nations General Assembly Resolution 491 (V) =

UN General Assembly Resolution 491
- Indonesia in the 50s
- Date: 28 September 1950
- Code: A/RES/491 (Document)
- Subject: Admission of Indonesia to the United Nations
- Result: Adopted

United Nations General Assembly Resolution 491 was adopted on 28 September 1950 for the admission of Republic of Indonesia to the United Nations. Accordingly to the recommendation by the United Nations Security Council Resolution 86, two days before the 289th UN General Assembly meeting, in which 10 countries voted for the admission of Indonesia meanwhile China abstained from the voting.

Indonesia became the 60th member of United Nations until its withdrawal in 1965 and established its own intergovernmental organization known as CONEFO, it later rejoined the UN in 1966.

== See also ==
- Indonesia and the United Nations
- United Nations Security Council Resolution 86
