= United Nations Security Council Resolution 86 =

UN Security Council Resolution 86
- Indonesia
- Date: 26 September 1950
- Meeting no.: 503
- Code: S/RES/86 (Document)
- Subject: Admission of new Members to the UN: Indonesia
- Voting summary: 10 voted for; None voted against; 1 abstained
- Result: Adopted

Security Council composition
- Permanent members: China; France; Soviet Union; United Kingdom; United States
- Non-permanent members: Cuba; Ecuador; Egypt; India; Norway; Yugoslavia

United Nations Security Council Resolution 86, adopted on September 26, 1950, having found that the Republic of Indonesia was a peace-loving State which fulfilled the conditions laid down in Article 4 of the United Nations Charter, the Council recommended that the UN General Assembly admit the Republic of Indonesia to membership in the United Nations.

The resolution was adopted with ten votes; the Republic of China abstained from voting.

== See also ==
- List of United Nations member states
- List of United Nations Security Council Resolutions 1 to 100 (1946–1953)
- United Nations General Assembly Resolution 491
