= Nelly Rivas =

Mistress of Juan Perón (1939–2012)

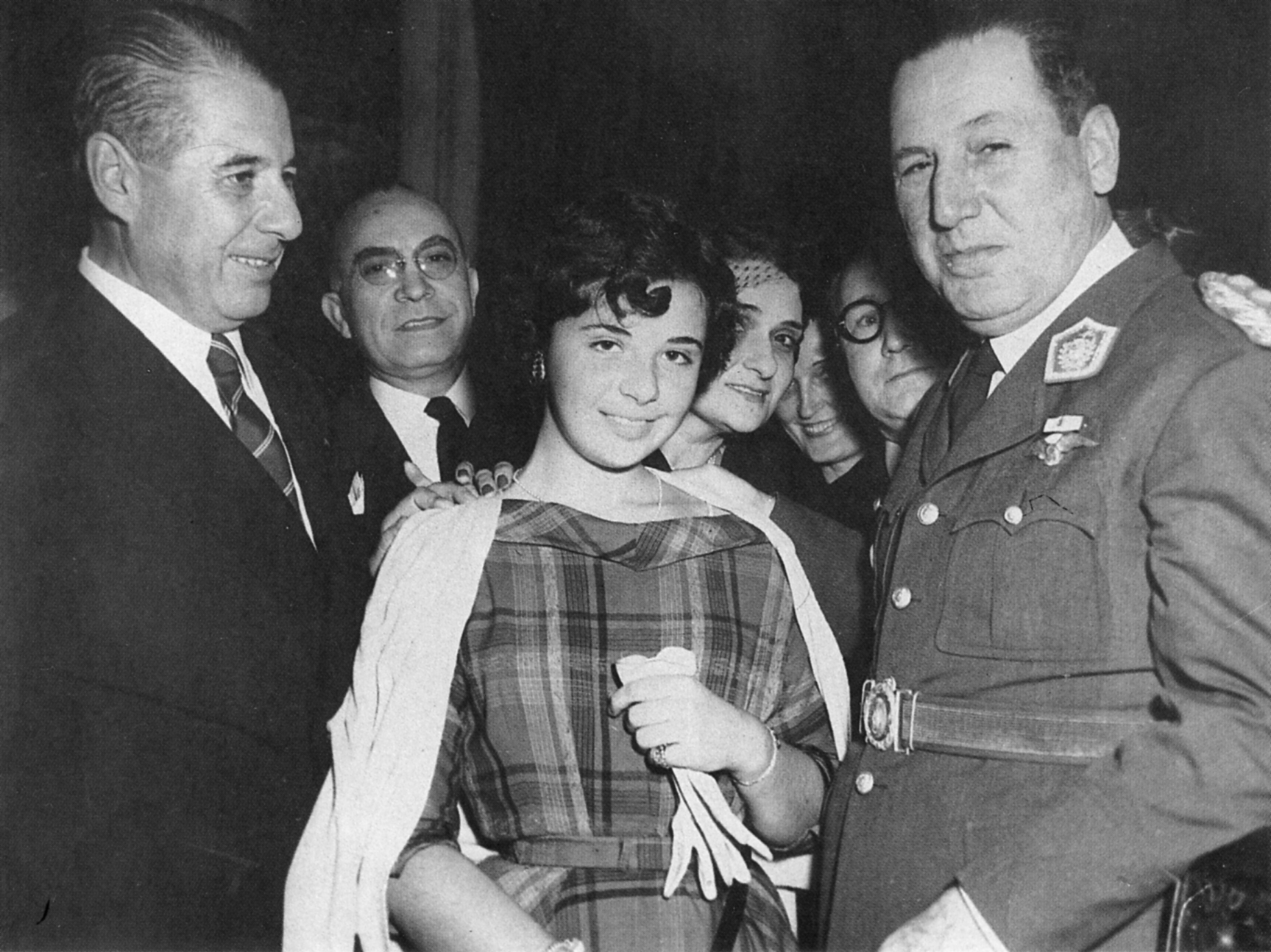
- Rivas (center) with Perón (right) in 1953
- Born: April 21, 1939; Rawson, Argentina
- Died: August 28, 2012 (aged 73); Buenos Aires, Argentina
- Known for: Alleged relationship with Juan Perón

Nélida Haydeé "Nelly" Rivas (April 21, 1939 – August 28, 2012) was an Argentine woman who was romantically linked to Juan Domingo Perón, President of Argentina, between the years 1953 and 1955, a relationship that allegedly began when Rivas was 14 years old. Although there are doubts about the veracity of this relationship, it was widely disseminated by Perón's opponents, and its first appearance originated during the military dictatorship of 1955, as part of a smear campaign against Perón.

== Early life ==
Nélida Haydeé Rivas was born on 21 April 1939 at the Rawson Hospital and was the only child of José María Rivas and María Sebastiana Viva. José Rivas was a worker at the Noel candy factory and his wife worked as a caretaker in an apartment building. As a teenager, Rivas participated in activities organised by the women's branch of the UES, an organisation that brought together high school students, at the presidential residence in Olivos.

== Encounter with Perón ==
As a teenager, she participated in the activities organized in the UES or Union of Secondary Students (female branch), a Peronist organization in which high school students met in the Presidential Residence at Olivos. At this time she met President Peron and allegedly became linked sentimentally, and sexually, with the Argentine president between the years 1953-1955, after the death of Evita Perón. At the time they first met she was either 13 or 14 years of age. Perón and Rivas were said to have met every two weeks.

This is how Nelly described her first face to face with Perón:

"I was speechless. I felt a chill run through my body. I began to tremble like a leaf (...) I had been stunned by his simplicity and cordiality. I hadn't expected him to be so handsome either."

Nelly told Zavala, according to what he says in his book:

"Perón, in our workers' house, was a god (...) It would be a great falsehood not to recognize that each one of us wanted to be a second Evita."

Though much of Argentina's media had, since 1950, been either controlled or monitored by Perón's government, lurid pieces on the supposed relationship filled the gossip pages. Pressed by reporters on whether his supposed new paramour was, as the magazines claimed, thirteen years of age, the fifty-nine-year-old Perón responded that he was "not superstitious."

Perón's biographer, Jill Hedges, argues that "the concept was hardly novel" in Argentina, and rumours of political figures having affairs with young girls in domestic service or similar positions were common, which did not make the story stand out amongst the other anti-Peronist allegations. Perón was also accused of having sexual encounters with film stars during the 1954 Mar del Plata International Film Festival, and photos of him with the members of the women's branch of Secondary Students' Union (Spanish: Unión de Estudiantes Secundarios, UES) that Rivas belonged to sparked moralistic critique already before the allegation of his romance with her was made. Anti-Peronist media mocked Perón for posing with the women of the UES, claiming that he was trying to "forget the irreparable absence [of Eva Perón]"; shortly afterwards, gossip of Perón's alleged relationship with Rivas appeared for the first time.

It is unknown whether the relationship between Nelly Rivas and Perón really took place. The relationship is considered an allegation. Victoria Allison considers the story a part of smear campaign against Perón conducted the military junta of Pedro Eugenio Aramburu, which included similar charges and rumours about Perón. Ferreyra notes that despite the story being a popular talking point amongst anti-Peronist circles, the Argentinian public at large did not believe the allegations, writing: "As the years went by, the persistence of the Peronist identity among the popular classes was a clear sign of the ineffectiveness of these denunciations." Argentine newspaper Agencia NOVA describes the relationship as "a falsehood", while Argentine lawyer and historian Ignacio Cloppet wrote that the affair was "a falsity". In 2021, Infobae published Cloppet's article in which he argued that the military junta altered witness testimonies and fabricated the case file.

Historian Norberto Galasso also questioned the veracity of the accusation, noting that the affair was not corroborated by Perón's domestic staff. Commenting on the claim that Rivas lived together with Perón in the presidential palace Casa Rosada, he wrote: "It is ruled out that the girl had lived at the presidential residence, since this information would have been disseminated through the residence's domestic staff, as well as visitors." According to Perón's staff, he had a relationship with a woman named García y García instead:

Furthemore, after Evita's death, he is known to have led an austere life and displayed irreproachable behavior. Only the closest staff at the presidential residence allow us to hear of a sporadic romantic relationship with a lady from a well-known family, also mentioned by Father Benítez, whose surname was García y García, but all with the utmost discretion. There were rumors of a possible marriage with Mary Terán de Weiss, the tennis player, but this remained a mere rumor.

== Life after Perón ==
The alleged relationship was cited among the reasons for the overthrow of Perón in 1955, and afterwards Perón was prosecuted for statutory rape, i.e., nonforcible sexual activity in which one of the individuals is below the age of consent, which under Argentine law is 15 years of age (she was 14 when he allegedly started the relationship). When Perón was overthrown in September 1955, she was arrested with her family in the province of Chaco. During the military government calling itself the "Revolución Libertadora" (Liberating Revolution), her parents were accused of complicity with Perón and convicted. They were confined in the Villa Devoto Prison, while Nelly was transferred to a Correctional Asylum for Minors, the San José Asylum.

The asylum was used by the government to house arrested prostitutes; there, Nelly's mental health was said to have deteriorated significantly, leading her to contemplate suicide. In 1957, Nelly was placed on probation and handed over to her paternal grandmother, María Barros. In 1958, Nelly married a former Argentine employee of the American embassy. On 29 April 1960, the court acquitted Rivas' parents, but on 11 August of the same year, the National Court of Appeals in Criminal and Correctional Matters overturned the acquittal and sentenced them to additional three years in prison for involvement in statutory rape.

Perón's alleged relationship with Rivas was frequently evoked by anti-Peronist regimes of 1950s and 1960s in attempt to discredit Peronism; Tad Szulc remarked in 1958 that Perón continues to "haunt Argentina as a highly effective political ghost", given the sensationalized and often falsified coverage of the deposed president in Argentinian media. Perón was described as mentally unstable and a "megalomaniac bent on destroying his own country through absurd subversion and criminal sabotage", and the accusations made against him regarding Nelly Rivas were used a proof of "sexual perversion" of Perón. Silvana G. Ferreyra remarked that "the image of Perón as a 'seducer of young girls' was part of the anti-Peronist credo".

In 1957, a newspaper in the United States published letters which it attributed to Rivas and Perón. The letters were subsequently questioned by some historians as fabrications. Perón denied being the author of the letters, and requested a handwriting expert's report. While in Paraguay, Perón commented on the letters:

As soon as I learned that the Argentine newspapers had begun the letter comedy, I invited the papers to exhibit the originals and submit them to a calligraphic examination. They didn't respond to this invitation; they attacked on other fronts and with other methods. […] Reading that letter attributed to me is laughable. At that time, I had other things to think about besides motorcycles to alleviate the bitterness of exile. And finally, after “many kisses and many thoughts”, sent with such warmth, I would have signed the letter with the same signature I used during my time in government.

While in exile, Perón sporadically commented on the matter. In Venezuela in late 1950s, he stated: "That young lady I met was a girl who attended the UES like many others. She is a child, and as a man I could not or cannot see in her anything other than what she is: a child. Because of my age, because of my experience, you can be sure that I did not transgress moral codes." On another occasion, when interviewed by Argentine journalist Adriana Civita in Paraguay, Perón stated: "I don't care what they said or didn't say, what they say or don't say! I'm no saint, but I wasn't going to mess with the little girls at the UES!"

In 1971, the judicial proceedings against Perón were discontinued when Perón was negotiating the legalization of the Partido Justicialista with the de facto president Alejandro Agustín Lanusse. In July 1972, the charge was dropped. In 1973, Perón returned to Argentina for his third presidency. Nelly at that time had two children.

She died on the 28th of August 2012 at the age of 73.

== Bibliography ==
- Nuestro Siglo: Historia de la Argentina, Tomo 1949-1955 "Escándalos y Frivolidades". Director y autor de la obra: Félix Luna. Hyspamérica y Editorial Sarmiento S.A. (1992).
- Amor y Violencia: La verdadera historia entre Perón y Nelly Rivas. Del autor Juan Ovidio Zavala. Editorial Planeta (1987).
- Nelly R., la amante del General: Novela (anti)histórica. Del autor Santiago Giralt (2008). Editorial Planeta. ISBN 978-950-04-3070-8
- Las vírgenes de Perón. Del autor Ignacio Yrigoyen. Ediciones B (1990).
