= United Nations Commission for Indonesia =

United Nations mission in Indonesia

- Abbreviation: UNCI
- Formation: 25 August 1947 (Committee of Good Offices); 28 January 1949 (UNCI)
- Type: Peacekeeping Mission
- Legal status: Ended 1950
- Parent organization: United Nations Security Council
- Website: UNCI

The United Nations Commission for Indonesia (Indonesian: Komisi Perserikatan Bangsa-Bangsa untuk Indonesia, UNCI) was a United Nations commission formed to replace the Committee of Good Offices known in Indonesian as Komisi Tiga Negara (lit. 'Trilateral Commission', not to be confused with the modern Trilateral Commission). The purpose of UNCI was to continue the duties of the previous commission, while at the same time overseeing the handover of the Indonesian territory to the republican government and reporting regularly to the United Nations Security Council. UNCI was formed after the Good Offices Commission was deemed to have failed to reconcile the conflict. UNCI played an important role in the Dutch–Indonesian Round Table Conference.

== Background ==
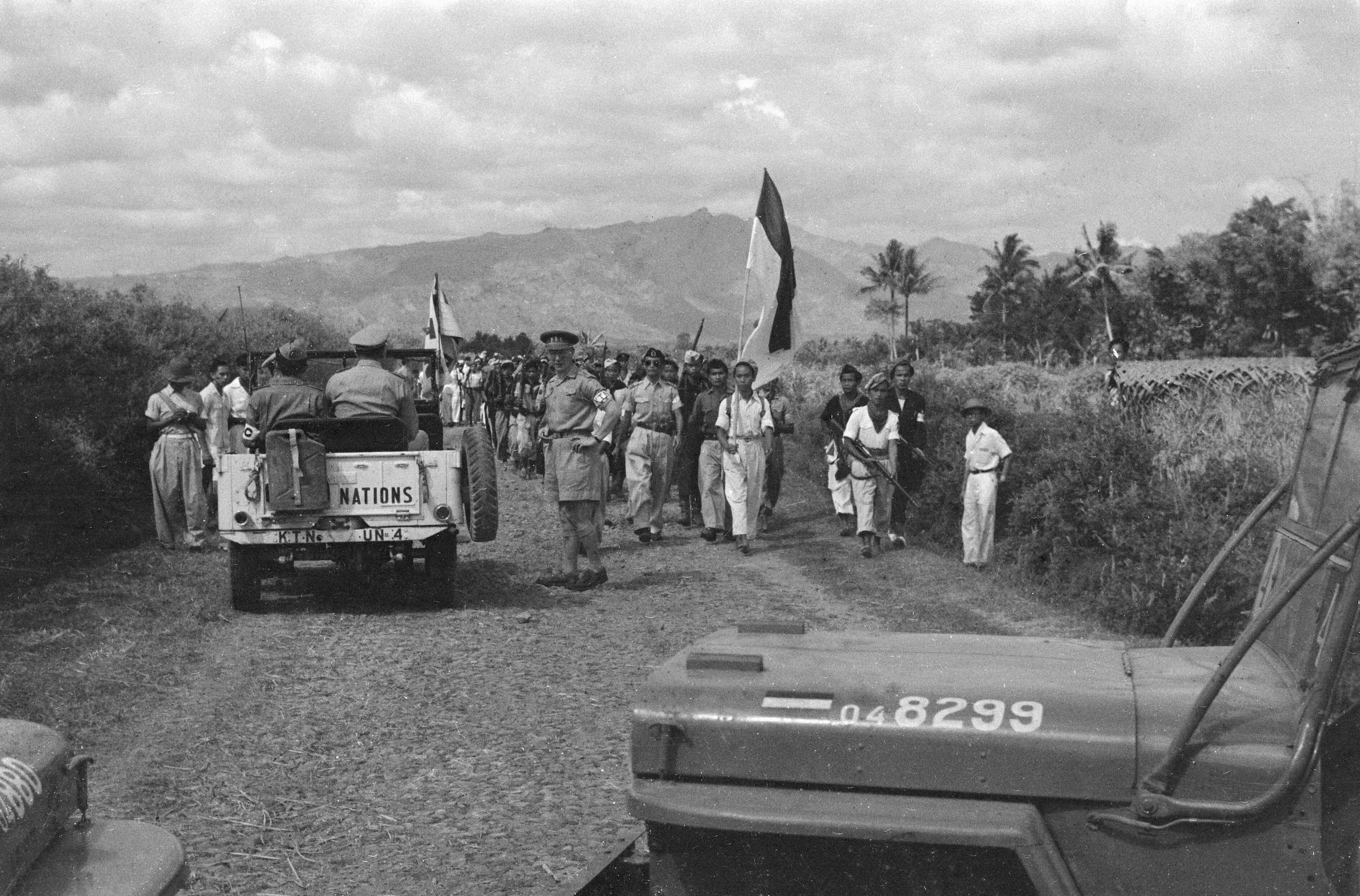
Meeting on a country road between officers of the Indonesian and Dutch army. Representatives of the United Nations are also present.(October 1949)

On 17 August 1945, Indonesian nationalist leader Sukarno proclaimed Indonesian independence from Japan who occupied the Dutch East Indies since 1942. The Dutch viewed the Indonesian Republican leadership on Java as Japanese collaborators, and wanted to regain control of their colony. The conflict between the Dutch and Indonesian nationalists and other involving parties developed into a full-scale national revolution.

By mid-1946, both sides were under international pressure to negotiate. The Dutch favoured a federal Indonesian state, and organised the Malino Conference in July 1946, which led to the establishment of the State of East Indonesia. In November, the Dutch and Indonesian sides reached an agreement at [[Linggadjati]], in which the Netherlands agreed to recognize de facto republican rule over parts of Java, Sumatra and Madura, and that republic would become a constituent state of a federal United States of Indonesia.

== Council's Committee of Good Offices ==
The United Nations security Council's Committee of Good Offices on the Indonesian question was established, pursuant to United Nations Security Council Resolution 31 of 25 August 1947, to assist in the pacific settlement of the dispute between the Netherlands and the Republic of Indonesia, at an informal meeting of the Committee convened by the Secretary-General of the United Nations at Lake Success, New York on 8 October 1947.

The committee, assembled in Sydney on 15 October held its first official meeting on 20 October. It was agreed that the members of the committee would not represent either of the contending parties, but act as a Committee in the spirit of the purposes and principles of the United Nations Charter. It was also decided that the chairmanship of the committee would be held in turn by the three member; each member holding office for a week. The Committee held three official meetings in Sydney and decided, after the receipt of invitations from the Prime Ministers of the Netherlands and the Republic of Indonesia, to proceed to Java as quick transportation arrangements could be completed in order to acquaint itself with the situation on the spot and meet with the parties as an essential preliminary to the commencement of its duties.

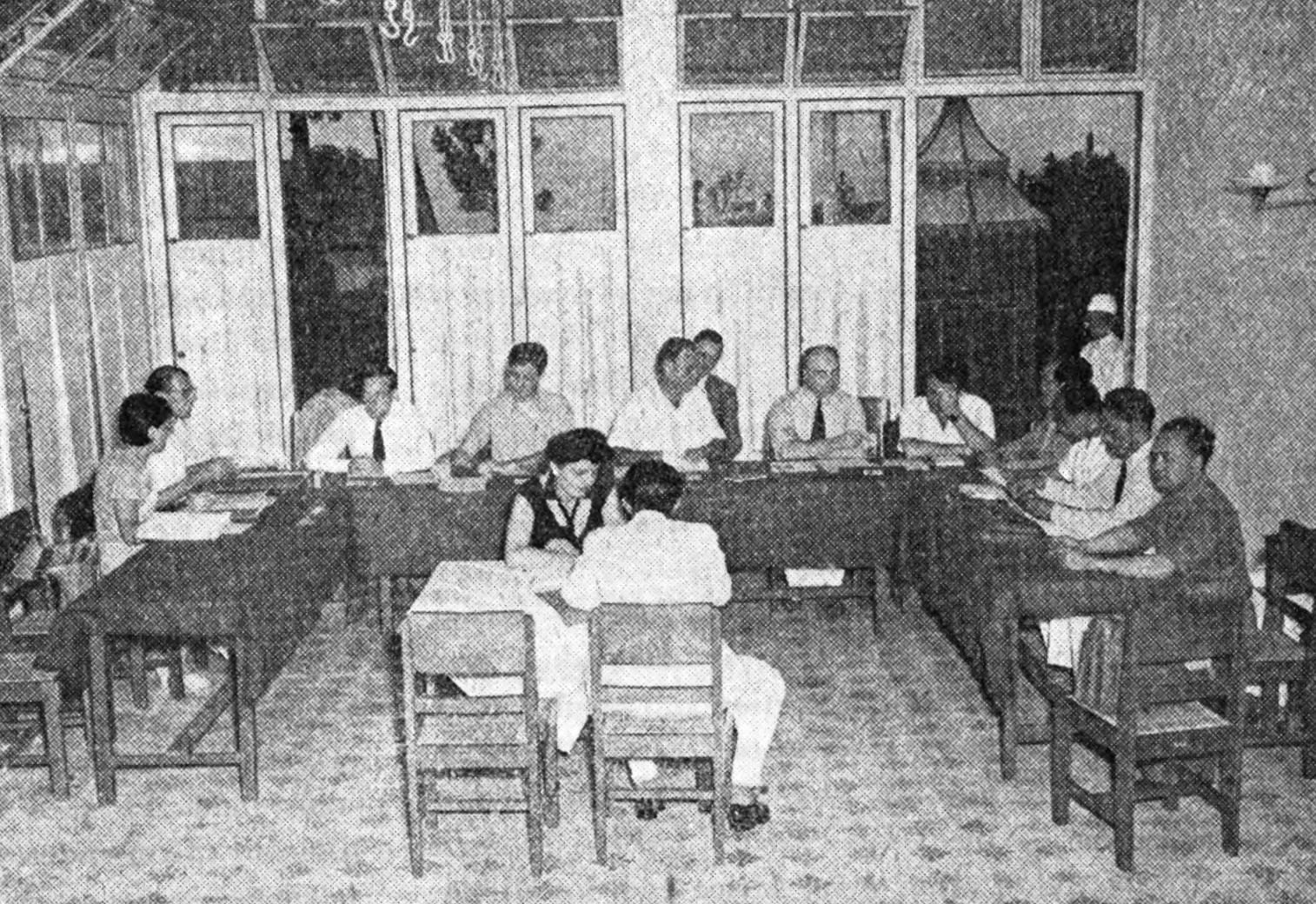
Meeting of the Committee of Good Offices in Kaliurang, 1948; Dutch representatives are on the left and Indonesian representatives are on the right.

Soon after its arrival in Java, the Committee found it necessary to state to the parties its view on its responsibilities under the terms of the resolution of the Security Council on the Indonesian Question and its procedure for assisting the Netherlands and the Republic of Indonesia in the pacific settlement of the dispute.

As regards its responsibilities under the terms of the Security Council resolutions, the Committee conveyed its views formally to the parties in a document dated 19 November, the substance of which had been conveyed informally on 7 November, to the committee representing the Netherlands Government. In that document the Committee stated that it would render all assistance possible to the parties in reaching a political settlement. In that connection, the committee would assume any and every task devolving upon it as the result of agreements or requests made by the parties from time to time. Nothing the Committee might do would bind either party, except under circumstances where two conditions were fulfilled only through agreement.

- (1) that both parties asked the committee to make recommendations
- (2) that both parties asked in advance that they would regard such recommendations binding. However, under the terms of paragraph 4 of the Security Council's resolution of 1 November on the Indonesian Question, the Committee considered itself directed by the council to offer its assistance to the parties, in the absence of any direct agreement between the parties, in reaching agreement on an arrangement which would ensure the observance of the cease fire resolution, without awaiting a request by either party that the Committee offer such assistance.

== Aftermath ==
Negotiations, which took place from 23 August to 2 November 1949, assisted by the UNCI reached agreement resulting in a number of documents, namely a Charter of Transfer of Sovereignty—to come into immediate effect—a statute of union, a draft constitution, an economic agreement and agreements on social and military affairs.

The Dutch parliament debated the agreement, and the upper and lower houses ratified it on 21 December 1949. The Central Indonesian National Committee, ratified the agreement on 14 December. Sovereignty was transferred to the United States of Indonesia on 27 December.
