= United Nations Security Council Resolution 40 =

United Nations Security Council resolution

UN Security Council Resolution 40
- Date: February 28 1948
- Meeting no.: 259
- Code: S/689 (Document)
- Subject: The Indonesian question
- Voting summary: 8 voted for; None voted against; 3 abstained
- Result: Adopted

Security Council composition
- Permanent members: China; France; Soviet Union; United Kingdom; United States
- Non-permanent members: Argentina; Belgium; Canada; Colombia; Syria; Ukrainian SSR

United Nations Security Council Resolution 40 was adopted on 28 February 1948. The Council requested that the Committee of Good Offices monitor and report political developments in western Java and Madura.

Resolution 40 passed with eight votes to none. Argentina, the Soviet Union, and the Ukrainian SSR abstained.

== See also ==
- Indonesian War of Independence
- United Nations Security Council Resolution 41
- United Nations Security Council Resolution 55
- United Nations Security Council Resolution 63
- List of United Nations Security Council Resolutions 1 to 100 (1946–1953)
