= Indonesia and the United Nations =

Republic of Indonesia

United Nations membership
- Represented by: Republic of Indonesia (1950–1965, 1966–present)
- Membership: Full member
- Since: 28 September 1950
- UNSC seat: Non-permanent
- Permanent Representative: Umar Hadi

Indonesia officially became the 60th member of the United Nations on 28 September 1950, in accordance with the United Nations Security Council Resolution 86 two days before, and the United Nations General Assembly resolution number A/RES/491 (V) on the "admission of the Republic of Indonesia to membership in the United Nations", less than one year after the independence of Indonesia's by the Netherlands at the Dutch–Indonesian Round Table Conference in the Hague (23 August – 2 November 1949).

== Diplomatic representation ==
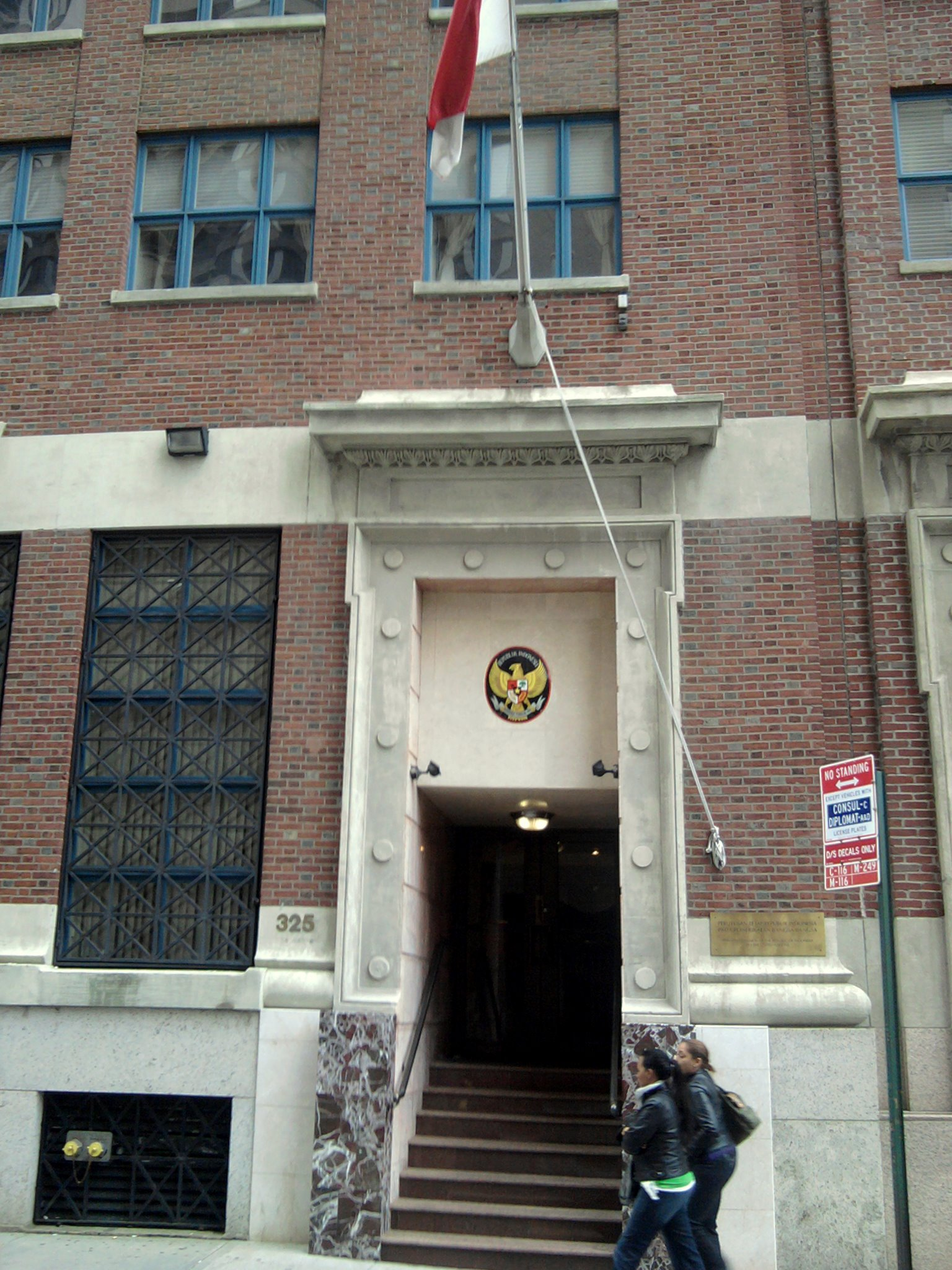
Permanent Mission of Indonesia to the UN at 325 East 38th Street in New York City

Indonesia has two permanent diplomatic missions to the UN in New York City and Geneva. These missions are headed by a Permanent Representative and an Ambassador. The Government of the Republic of Indonesia appointed Lambertus Nicodemus Palar as the first Permanent Representative to the United Nations. Palar had played a major role in efforts for the international recognition of the independence of Indonesia at the time of the conflict with the Netherlands in 1947, and had argued the case for the sovereignty of Indonesia in the UN as an Observer to the organization. Speaking at the UN General Assembly session in 1950, Ambassador Palar thanked all the supporters of Indonesia's sovereignty and pledged that his country would carry out its obligations as a member of the United Nations.

The responsibility of the Indonesian Mission is to represent the Indonesian interests in the UN including international security, disarmament, human rights, humanitarian affairs, environment, labor, international economic cooperation and development, international trade, South–South cooperation, technology transfer, intellectual property rights, telecommunications, health, and meteorology.

== Withdrawal in 1965 ==
During the Indonesia–Malaysia confrontation of 1965 and in response to the election of Malaysia as a non-permanent member of the United Nations Security Council, Indonesia decided to withdraw from the UN. Indonesia did not withdraw from the UN but informed Secretary-General U Thant that it would suspend its participation. Indonesian president, Sukarno, then created a rival to UN named CONEFO. However, in a telegram dated 19 September 1966, after General Suharto de facto assumed effective control of the Government, Indonesia notified the Secretary-General of its decision "to resume full cooperation with the United Nations and to resume participation in its activities starting with the twenty-first session of the General Assembly". On 28 September 1966, the UN General Assembly took note of the decision of the Government of Indonesia and the UNGA President invited the representatives of Indonesia to take their seats in the Assembly.

== Activities ==
=== UN General Assembly ===
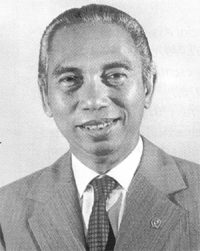
Adam Malik, President of the 26th Session of the UN General Assembly

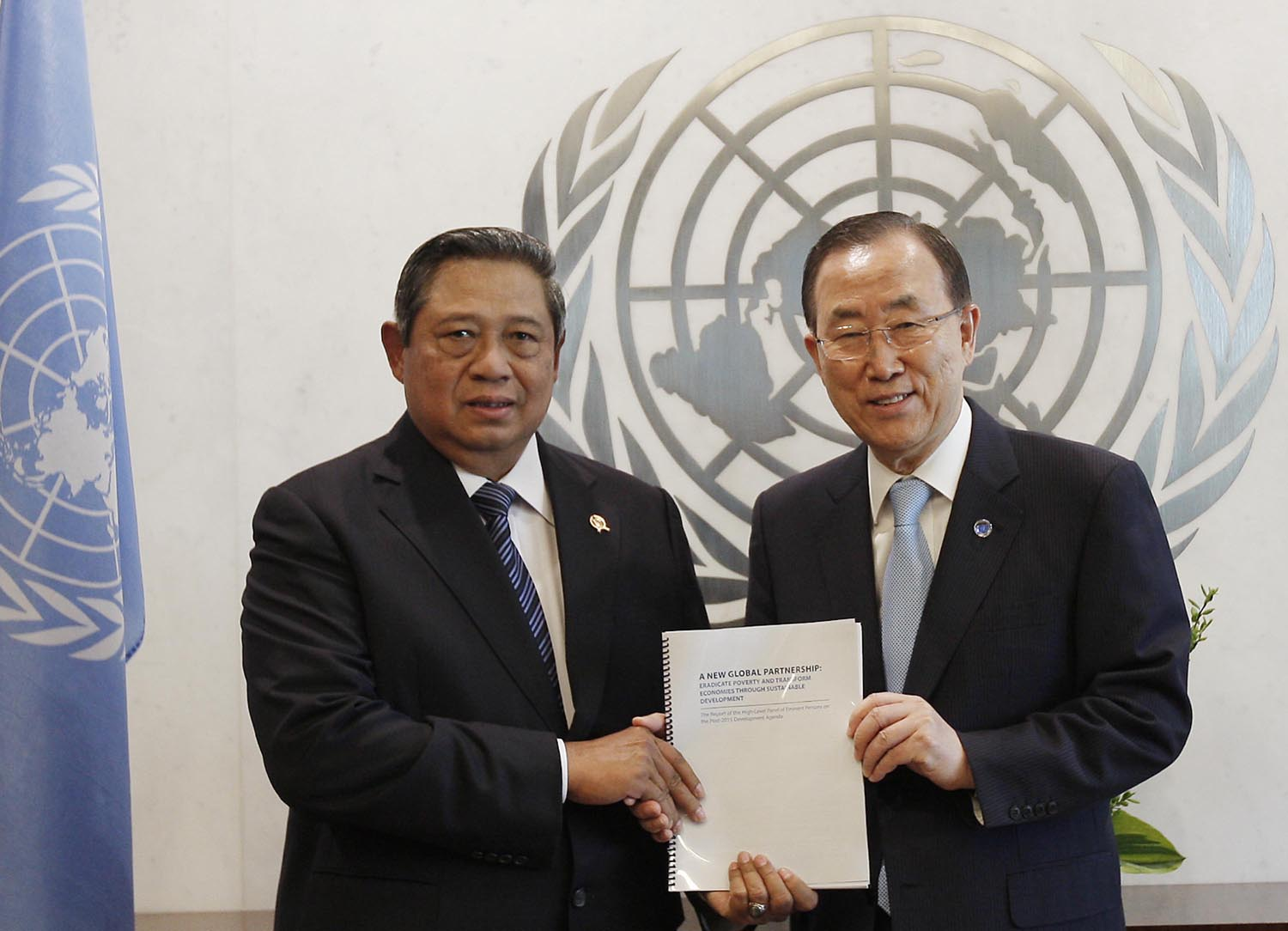
President Susilo Bambang Yudhoyono with UN Secretary-General Ban Ki-moon in New York City, 30 May 2013

Indonesia became a member of the UN General Assembly in 1951. Indonesia was once elected to serve as President of the UN General Assembly in 1971, represented by Foreign Minister Adam Malik. He was the chairman of the 26th UN General Assembly session on UNGA Resolution 2578. He was the second representative from Asia to chair the world assembly, after Dr. Carlos Pena Romulo from the Philippines.

=== UN Security Council ===
Indonesia has been elected four times as non-permanent member to the UN Security Council. Indonesia was first elected as for the period of 1974–1975. It was elected for the second time in 1995–1996 and for the third time in 2007–2008, when Indonesia was elected with 158 votes out of the then 192 member states who have the right to vote in the UN General Assembly. In June 2018, Indonesia was elected with 144 votes out of 192 member states during the 72nd session of the United Nations General Assembly.

=== UN Economic and Social Council ===
Indonesia served as a member of ECOSOC for the periods of 1956–1958, 1969–1971, 1974–1975, 1979–1981, 1984–1986, 1989–1991, 1994–1996, 1999–2001, 2004–2006, 2007–2009 and 2012–2014. Indonesia elected twice and held the position as President of ECOSOC in 1970 and 2000, and was elected to the Vice-Presidency of ECOSOC in 1969, 1999 and 2012. During the 2012–2014 term, Indonesia was selected for membership of ECOSOC, winning the greatest support of any Asian country in the election by secret ballot that took place during UN General Assembly plenary session of October 24, 2011, in New York.

=== UN Human Rights Council ===
Indonesia has been elected three times as a member of the UN Human Rights Council since the council was formed in 2006. Indonesia served as a member during the periods of 2006–2007, 2007–2010 and 2011–2014. Indonesia once served as vice-president of the UN Human Rights Council for the period of 2009–2010, represented by Ambassador Dian Triansyah Djani. Indonesia was elected President of the United Nations Human Rights Council for the 20th cycle (January 1 2026 – December 31 2026) represented by Ambassador Sidharto Reza Suryodipuro on January 8, 2026, succeeding Switzerland. Indonesia's candidacy was endorsed by China, Japan and South Korea as members of the Group of Asia and the Pacific Small Island Developing States.

== See also ==
- Foreign relations of Indonesia
- United Nations Commission for Indonesia
