= History of Argentina (1946–1955) =

Argentine Republic República Argentina (Spanish)
- 1946–1955
- Flag Coat of arms
- Motto: "En unión y libertad"; ("In Unity and Freedom")
- Anthem: Himno Nacional Argentino ("Argentine National Anthem")
- Capital: Buenos Aires
- Common languages: Spanish, Italian dialects (minority)
- Government: Federal presidential republic
- President
  - 1946-1955: Juan Domingo Perón (reelected in 1951)
- History
  - Established: 1946
  - 1949 Constitutional Reform: March 1949
  - Peron is reelected: November 11, 1951
  - Bombing of Plaza de Mayo: June 16, 1955
  - Disestablished: 1955

Population
  - Estimate: 18,720,000 (1955)
  - Census: 16,055,765 (1947)
- GDP (PPP): estimate
  - Total: $158.01 billion (1955); (expressed in international-$ at 2011 prices)
- Currency: Argentine peso (moneda nacional)

The history of Argentina from 1946 to 1955, known as the Peronist Years or the Peronist Era (Spanish: Era Peronista), began with the election of Juan Domingo Perón to presidency, and ended with the 1955 coup d'état which ousted Perón's government.

His government was influential for initiating industrialization in Argentina, expanding social rights (such as for workers, women, children, and the elderly) and making public university tuition-free. Alongside his wife, Eva Duarte ("Evita"), they also pushed for women's suffrage, provided charity and built approximately half a million houses. Other relevant measures include reforming the constitution in 1949 to add second generation rights; the creation of the UTN (originally named National Worker's University); paying off all the national debt; nationalizing the central bank, the entire banking system and the railways.

This period of history is often divided between the First Peronism (1946–1951) that corresponds to Perón's first presidency, and Second Peronism (1951–1955) that corresponds to his second term, after being re-elected in 1951.

== Perón's First Term (1946–1952) ==
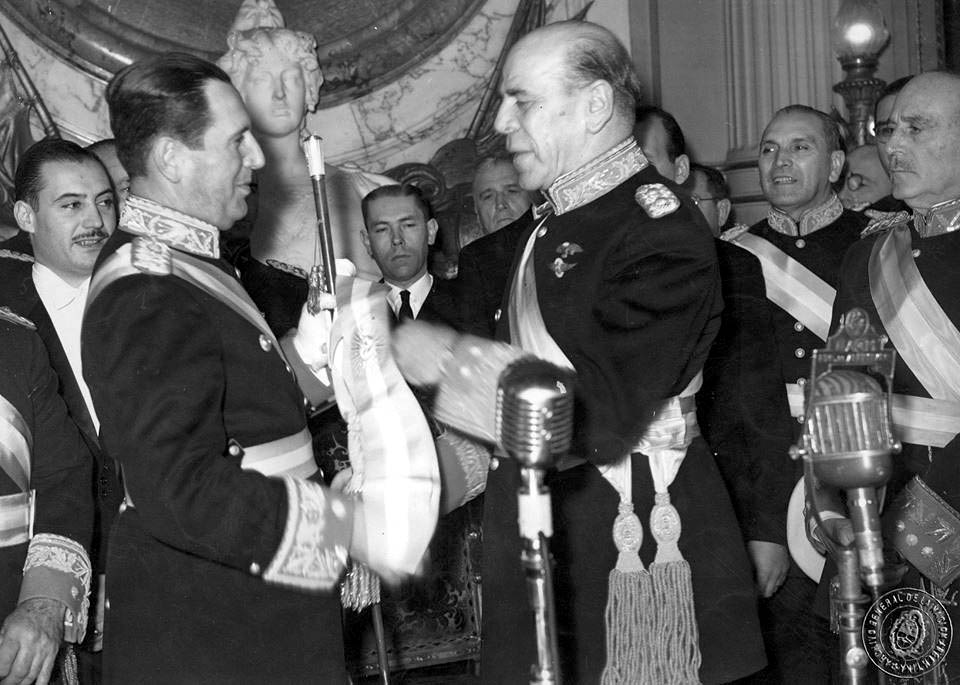
Juan Domingo Perón receives the presidential attributes from his predecessor Edelmiro Farrel on June 4, 1946.

When Perón was elected, his coalition won the majority of the chamber of deputies and the entirety of the senate. As a result, his government was able to replace the supreme court judges with others aligned with them. Therefore, the Peronist government had the control of the three powers of the republic.

=== Economy ===
In 1945, an year before Perón was elected, the economy of Argentina was gradually industrializing, but it still remained dependent on agricultural exports to Europe. This dependence resulted in European powers influencing the prices of Argentine production and the value of the national currency. The railway companies set freight rates in their London-based boards of directors. The structure of the Argentine central bank was based on the designs of British banker Otto Niemeyer. The Central Bank was a private entity and British interests held a majority of its stake; the president of the Central Bank was appointed by the president of Argentina, but only 5 of its 12 directors were Argentine and the majority were private-bank executives. In addition, foreign banks regulated credit in Argentina and controlled the international transport of Argentine exports.

By 1946, Argentina found itself with significant reserves of gold and foreign currencies originating from exports during the World War II. The accumulation of a favorable balance in the trade balance in the form of gold in custody abroad and foreign currency deposited in banks in the United States and in the Bank of England reached 1,697 million dollars.

The economic project of Peron's government revolved around the consolidation of the industrialization process within Argentina. As to reduce foreign dependency and because the industrial model promised to create many more jobs. This was important considering that in many areas of the Argentine countryside people were barely surviving as field laborers. The Industrial Credit Bank (created in 1944) was key to the consolidation of the industrial sector; during the Peronist governments it financed almost 52% on average of all industrial activity, with peaks of up to 78.3% in 1949, 64.1% in 1951 and 54.2% in 1952.

In 1947, Perón created the Argentine Steel Mixed Society (Somisa), appointing General Manuel Savio and the Agua y Energía Eléctrica company as its head. In 1948 he created the National Telecommunications Company (ENTel). In 1950 he created Aerolíneas Argentinas, the first Argentine aviation company. Perón affirmed that Argentina had obtained political freedom in 1810, but not economic independence.

==== Establishment of the Argentine Institute for the Promotion of Exchange (IAPI) ====
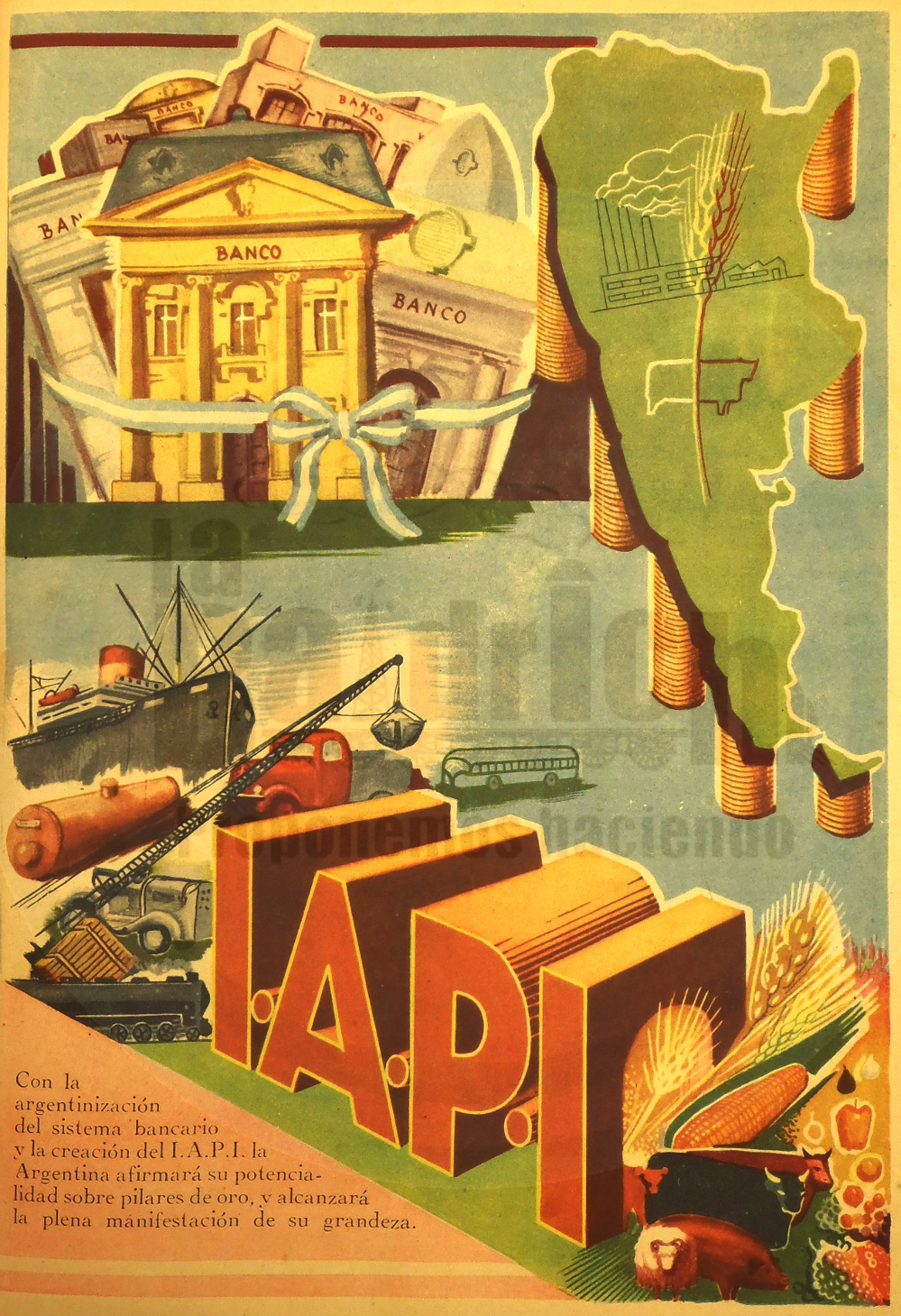
IAPI propaganda.

The Argentine Institute for the Promotion of Exchange (IAPI) was one of the boldest expression of economic transformation during Peron's government. It was an institution that enforced a centralized state-monopoly over foreign trade, by assuming the direct operations of exports and imports; subsequently, it transferred resources from the countryside to industry. Its creation practically meant a nationalization of foreign trade.

It was actually established during the 1943 Revolution, via the decree-law 15,350 on May 28, 1946 by de facto president Edelmiro Farrell. However, it was during the presidencies of Perón when the IAPI was given a hugely important role for the economy. The IAPI replaced middlemen and groups that managed exports, buying agricultural and livestock products from producers at a fixed price, and negotiating sales with the external buyers. Thus, the IAPI imposed prices abroad that could have never been able to be obtained before. Until 1949, it sold abroad for double the rate it paid to rural producers. It derived the surpluses of these operations to investments in capital goods, the nationalized financial system and essential raw materials for manufacturing; thereby transferring income from the agriculture to the booming industrializal sector.

The marketing of agricultural production was traditionally carried out by a network of collectors and export consortia, most of which were foreign. The Second World War generated favorable conditions for local exports. Faced with the post-war crisis and in an attempt to recover in better conditions, the countries demanding raw materials from Europe made the decision to group together in cartels for the purchase of these products, called monopsonies. Faced with this, Argentina acted in the same way but centralizing its foreign trade, like other exporting countries such as Australia (Australia Wheat Board), Canada (Canadian Wheat Board) or the USA (Commodity Credit Corporation). “If there is a single buyer, there is a single seller,” was the official slogan that gave rise to the creation of the IAPI.

The IAPI was composed of a president, a vice president and a board of directors with seven directors individually proposed by: the Ministry of Agriculture, the Secretariat of Industry and Commerce, the Central Bank, the Credit Industrial Bank and sectors of industry and agriculture. The board of directors proposed a manager and an assistant manager, who would be appointed by the National Executive Power. The IAPI, was dependent on the Central Bank under Miguel Miranda. In the first major restructuring, since September 30, 1949, the IAPI goes from depending on the Central Bank to acting under the orbit of the Ministry of Economy by means of Decree No. 13,668.

Some of its consequences included a rise in agricultural credit from 400 million pesos in 1945 to 2.9 billion in 1951, credit aid to cooperatives amounting to 1 billion pesos during the first five years, and an investment of 20 million pesos on the creation of agricultural schools between 1947 and 1951. Additionally, the Central Bank granted forestry loans totaling 41,330,000 pesos from 1946 to 1951, while the production of forestry plants increased from 3,140,000 to 11,330,000.

===== Nationalization of the Argentine Railways =====
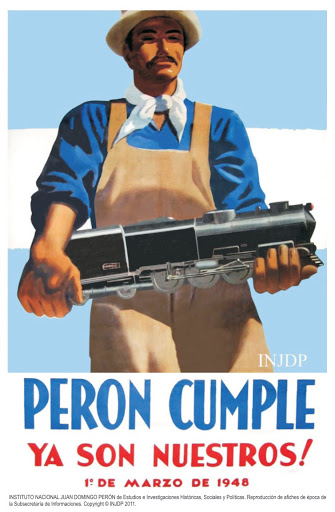
Propaganda of the nationalization of the Argentine Railways.

The IAPI managed the nationalization of the railways in 1947 and 1948, being one of the economic milestones of the first Peronist government. Before the nationalization, the system was divided into three groups of companies: those with British capital, those with French capital, and those already state-owned. The railways were in the most part profitable, but also, its fees were a decisive incentive for nationalization: Miguel Miranda (director of the IAPI) argued in 1947 that there was a system of different fees that favored agricultural products at the expense of industrial or finished articles and essential materials for industry, with serious detriment to the country's industrial economy and its rail transport.

The international context also easned the nationalization. During World War II and after it, the pound sterling ceased to be convertible into other currencies, which complicated the foreign trade of Great Britain, which by 1945 was accumulating international debts seven times greater than its reserves of dollars and gold, weakening its ability to maintain investments abroad, such as railways in Argentina. In this context, under the conditions of the Marshall Plan, the United States demanded that the balances accumulated in pounds be convertible to any currency, which allowed it to inject dollars into the world economy and consolidate American commercial hegemony. Faced with these pressures, Great Britain chose to "unlock" its pounds by selling assets such as railways to the Argentine State, while France, also with a devastated economy, was equally forced to sell its railway companies.

British railways were nationalized by Decree 5,789 of February 1948. Likewise, by Decree 31,218 of 1947, French companies were included in the network of lines. To politically control the companies nationalized, in June 1948, the entire railway network passed under the control of the new Secretariat of Transportation of the Nation, reporting directly to the President of the Nation.

==== First Five-Year Plan ====
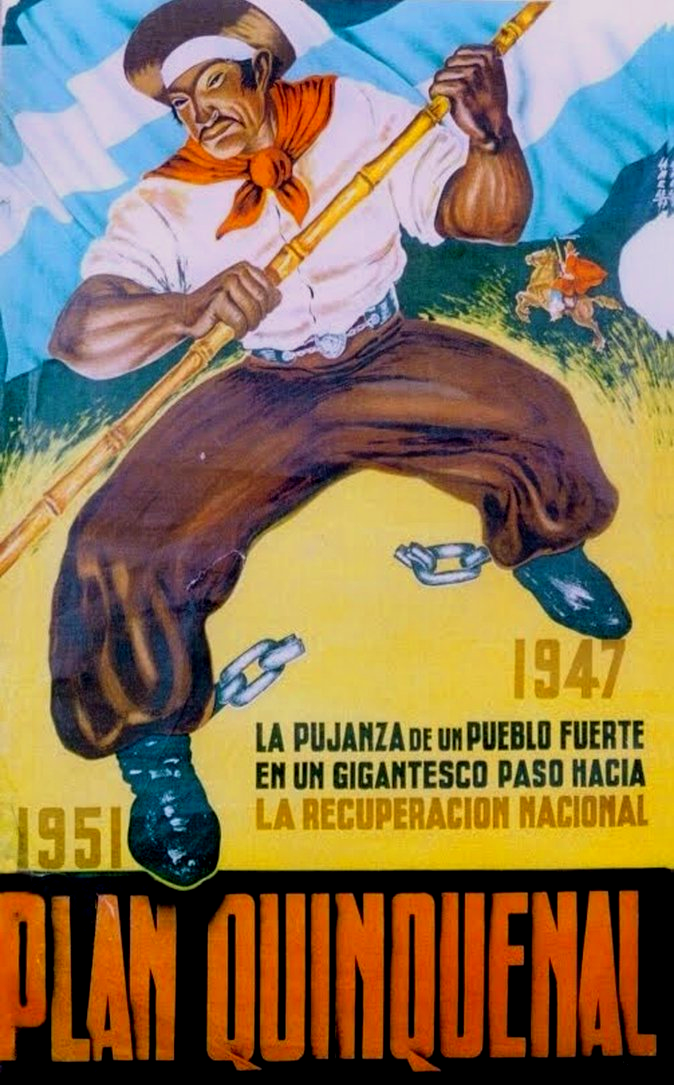
Propaganda for the First Five-Year Plan.

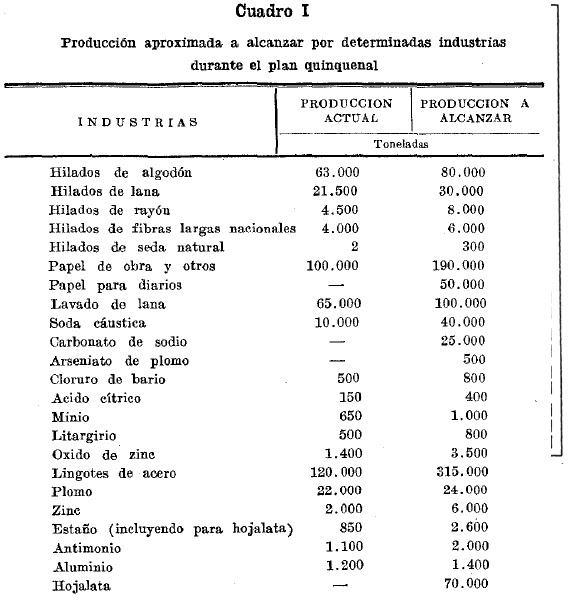
Graph showing the intended production to reach in various economic areas.

At the beginning of the second half of 1946, José Figuerola, Legal and Technical Secretary of the Presidency, presented the Five-Year Plan on September 30 of that year. It was officially announced in the presidential message on October 19, 1947.

The plan centered around three key areas: State Governance, National Defense, and the Economy. Economically, it focused on state-led industrialization, providing financial incentives and protecting national industry through tariff barriers; nationalization of banks, deposit accounts, transportation and public services; implementing wealth redistribution policies; and making state investments in the road network. The nationalization of foreign-owned public services was due to the fact that the payment for their services mortgaged the value of our exports, and that on some occasions it compromised 38% of them.

Some of the measures included nationalizing the Central Bank and the entire Argentine banking system by Law 12,962 in march 1947, as to support industrial development and trade. By 1952, the external debt was fully paid off, shifting the country from debtor to creditor. Key state enterprises were established, including nationalized telecommunications (ENTEL) and gas services. A number of policies aimed at expanding and improving oil distribution as a step toward eventually nationalizing it; increasing the supply of industrial inputs to lower their cost and promote the development of this economic sector; boosting energy production to strengthen the energy matrix and enhance overall productivity; and introducing a new customs law aligned with the process of import substitution. Public works expanded access to potable water and sanitation, benefiting millions more by 1955. The nationalization of railways between 1946 and 1948 unified and expanded the network to over 45,000 kilometers by 1954. Ports, grain elevators, power plants, hydroelectric dams, and oil refineries were developed, alongside the creation of a merchant fleet and investments in coal and petroleum exploration. Worker rights advanced with rural labor statutes, labor courts, and pensions for commerce employees. Housing initiatives delivered 350,000 homes, new residential neighborhoods, and landmark projects like Ciudad Evita. Infrastructure achievements included the Ezeiza International Airport, irrigation systems, rural sanitation, and national parks, all fostering modernization and economic self-reliance.

These policies were based on economic planning, aiming to integrate production with credit and investment. This approach was complemented by a social policy focused on supporting the most vulnerable sectors. These policies were effective and delivered results thanks to the active role of an interventionist state. However, by the end of Perón's first presidency, the downside became evident as economic growth reached its limits (a pattern that would occur again in later periods) due to the constraints of a limited productive structure, which led to the recurring external restrictions on the national economy.

=== Education Policy ===
Universities had been intervened during the 1943 Revolution and were intervened again in 1946 shortly after Perón's rise to power. Political activity was restricted, many professors were replaced and there was no academic or scientific autonomy. The University of Buenos Aires became a challenge for Perón's government, as it had a strong reformist character and was openly against many of the government's measures.

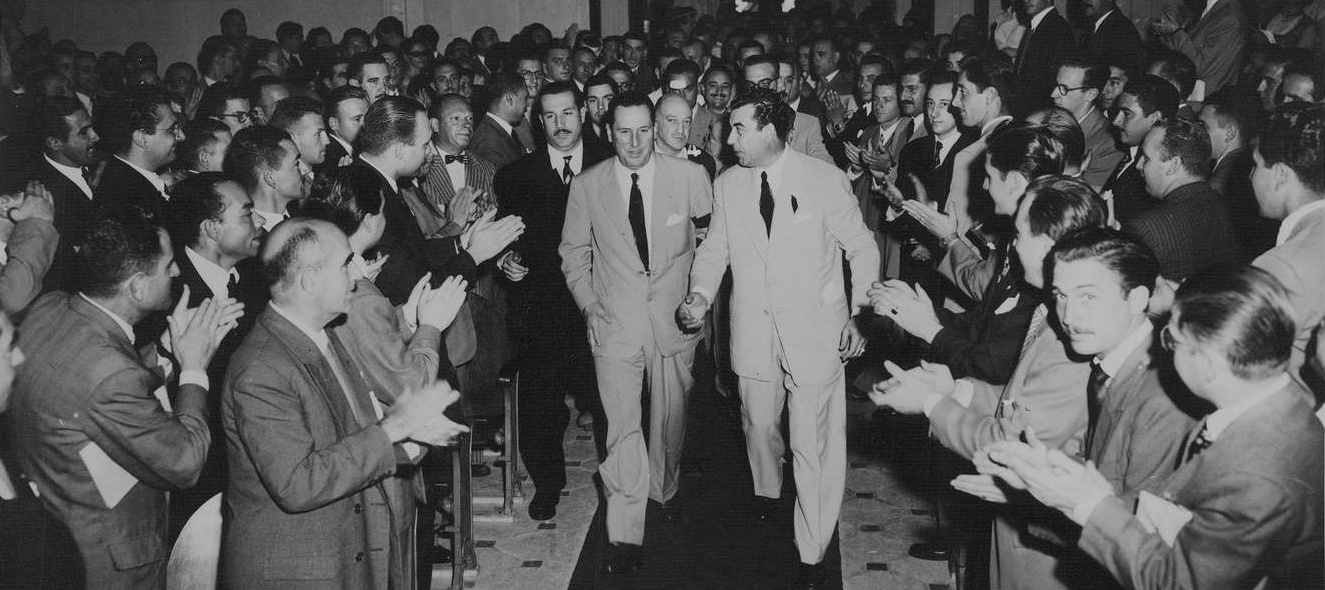
Perón during the opening of the Worker's National University.

The reform "New School" made by Jorge Arizaga, subsecretary of the ministry of education, changed the education system to be focused on training students with practical skills for work. It sought professionalization and vocational education in schools. Introducing the possibility for high schools to offer a technical degree.

The creation of the National Workers' University (current-day National Technological University) was one of the most innovative education policies during Perón's government. It sought to train the working class in technical areas that would be useful to them. Thus, it awarded the title of factory engineer, among others. It was especially designed (but not restricted) to be a continuation for those students who had received a technical degree in high school.

Law 13,031, known as the Guardo Law, was enacted in 1947 to regulate higher education in Argentina, emphasizing the social role of universities as promoters of national development. Partially inspired by the principles of the 1918 University Reform, it encouraged student participation in faculty governance through representatives selected from top-performing students. Nevertheless, it prohibited faculty and students from engaging in political activities or forming associations within universities. In addition, it eliminated university autonomy and co-governance, as university rectors were appointed by the Executive Branch and, in turn, selected faculty deans. The law also introduced state-funded scholarships for outstanding students from working-class families, though university education would not become free until 1949.

At the end of 1949, Presidential Decree No. 29 337/49 was passed. It has four articles, which provide for the cessation of university tuition payments from June 1949 onwards. In addition, the Ministry of Finance is urged to secure funds so that the economic situation of the universities is not harmed.

=== 1949 Constitutional Reform ===
On August 27, 1948, Congress passed Law No. 13,233, declaring the need to reform the National Constitution. On September 20, Law No. 13,262 was enacted, establishing that the election of constitutional convention delegates would take place alongside the elections for national deputies and electors for senators. The constituent convention met in Buenos Aires. He began the preparatory sessions on January 24, 1949, sanctioned the new reformed text on March 11 and concluded with the oath on March 16 of that year.

The Argentine Constitution of 1949 was one of the social constitutions of its time, adding several second-generation rights. Chapter III, titled "Rights of Workers, Families, the Elderly, and Education and Culture," consists of a single, extensive article (Article 37), divided into four sections that outline specific rights. The first section, "Worker's Rights" guarantees the right to work, fair remuneration, training, dignified working conditions, health preservation, well-being, social security, family protection, economic advancement, and the defense of professional interests. The second section, "Family Rights" ensures the legal equality of spouses, family welfare, and state support for mothers and children. The third section, "Elder Rights" provides for assistance, housing, food, clothing, physical and moral health care, recreation, work, tranquility, and respect. The fourth section, addressing "Education and Culture" designates the family as the primary responsible entity, with support from the state and educational institutions, mandates free and compulsory primary education, promotes the creation of rural schools, career guidance services, university autonomy, the role of universities in regional development, and guarantees state protection for science, art, cultural heritage, and scholarships at all levels.

Also, it implemented articles which consolidated Perón's political power even further. For instance, article 77 was modified and allowed the president to be re-elected indefinitely. Additionally, it incorporated elements of Peronist ideology into the constitution. For example, the reform added the following phrase to the Preamble, alluding to the three pillars of Peronism: "...the irrevocable decision to establish a socially fair, economically free, and politically sovereign nation." Another example is Article 40, which guaranteed decisive state control over the economy in areas such as energy, public services, and foreign trade, as well as in sectors where private monopolies or oligopolies operated. It also established a mechanism for calculating the expropriation price of companies managing public services, factoring in "surpluses beyond a reasonable profit" into the calculation.

=== Huemul Project ===
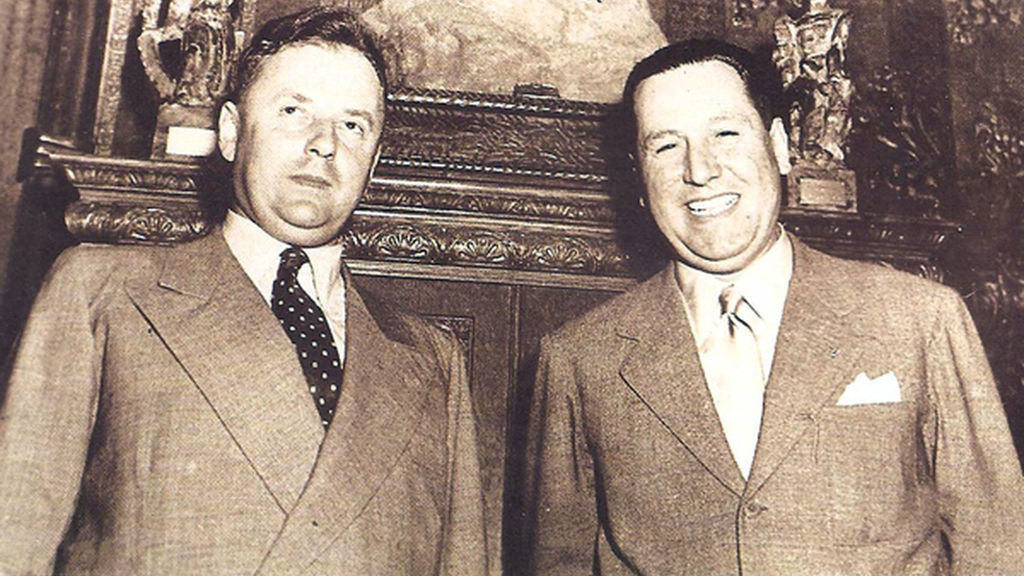
Ronald Richter (left) with Juan Perón (right).

Perón's objective of achieving atomic development in Argentina was a constant task during his two presidential terms. At the end of 1949, the construction of secret laboratories for this project began on Huemul Island, in Lake Nahuel Huapi in Argentine Patagonia. During 1948, the Austrian physicist Ronald Richter presented President Perón with a project to develop controlled nuclear fusion, a possibility that at that time no laboratory in the world had achieved, and which resulted in a topic of great interest because it would imply having a practically inexhaustible source of energy.

Due to his political disagreements with Argentine scientists of stature, such as Enrique Gaviola, Perón was reluctant to seek their advice on Richter's proposal, and he gave Richter carte blanche and appointed him as his personal representative in the Bariloche area. By decree 10936 of May 31, 1950, Perón created the National Atomic Energy Commission (CNEA). Its director was Perón himself, and Colonel González served as general secretary.

On February 16, 1951, Richter reported that the first controlled nuclear fusion in Argentine history had taken place on the remote Patagonian island. On March 24, 1951, almost simultaneously with a successful flight of the Pulqui plane directed by Tank, Perón announced through a message read and transmitted by radio to the entire country that at the Atomic Energy Pilot Plant on Huemul Island, located 8 kilometers from San Carlos de Bariloche (and which belonged to the CNEA from 1949 to 1975), thermonuclear reactions were carried out under controlled conditions on a technical scale.

The next day, Richter himself reported that the thermonuclear fusion reaction would provide non-polluting, unlimited and cheap energy, with lower costs in relation to the process followed in foreign countries. The announcements caused great concern (although not surprise) in the governments of the United States and England, who thanks to the actions of their intelligence services knew precisely the large number of German technicians who arrived in Argentina after the fall of the Third Reich.

However, in September 1952, President Perón appointed 32-year-old physicist José Antonio Balseiro to evaluate the viability of the scientific work at the Huemul Island Atomic Energy Plant, coming from England where he was conducting nuclear research. Balseiro's report concluded that Dr. Richter's theoretical concepts lacked the necessary foundation to achieve a sustained and controlled thermonuclear reaction. As a result, the Huemul Project, a key initiative for national atomic development, was canceled in November 1952 by Perón, who also pressured the national media to downplay the global embarrassment of the project's failure.

The Huemul Project into which he had poured millions of dollars ended up being a scam for the government, and the scientific world mocked the project. "Perón's atomic dream is fading," announced the New York Times. Mariscotti estimated that the nuclear experiment cost about 15 million dollars at the time (about 500 million today).

== Perón's Second Term (1952–1955) ==
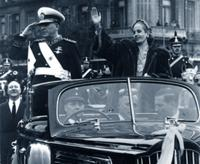
Perón and the ailing Evita during his second inaugural parade, June 1952. Eva died the following month.

In 1949, Perón had reformed the National Constitution, which enabled him to exercise a new mandate from 1952 to 1955.

Facing only token UCR and Socialist Party opposition and despite being unable to field his popular wife, Eva, as a running mate, Perón was re-elected in 1951 winning with 62% of the votes, with a margin of over 30%. This election was the first to have extended suffrage to Argentine women and the first in Argentina to be televised: Perón was inaugurated on Channel 7 public television that October. He began his second term in June 1952 with serious economic problems, however, compounded by a severe drought that helped lead to a US$500 million trade deficit (depleting reserves).

=== Economy ===
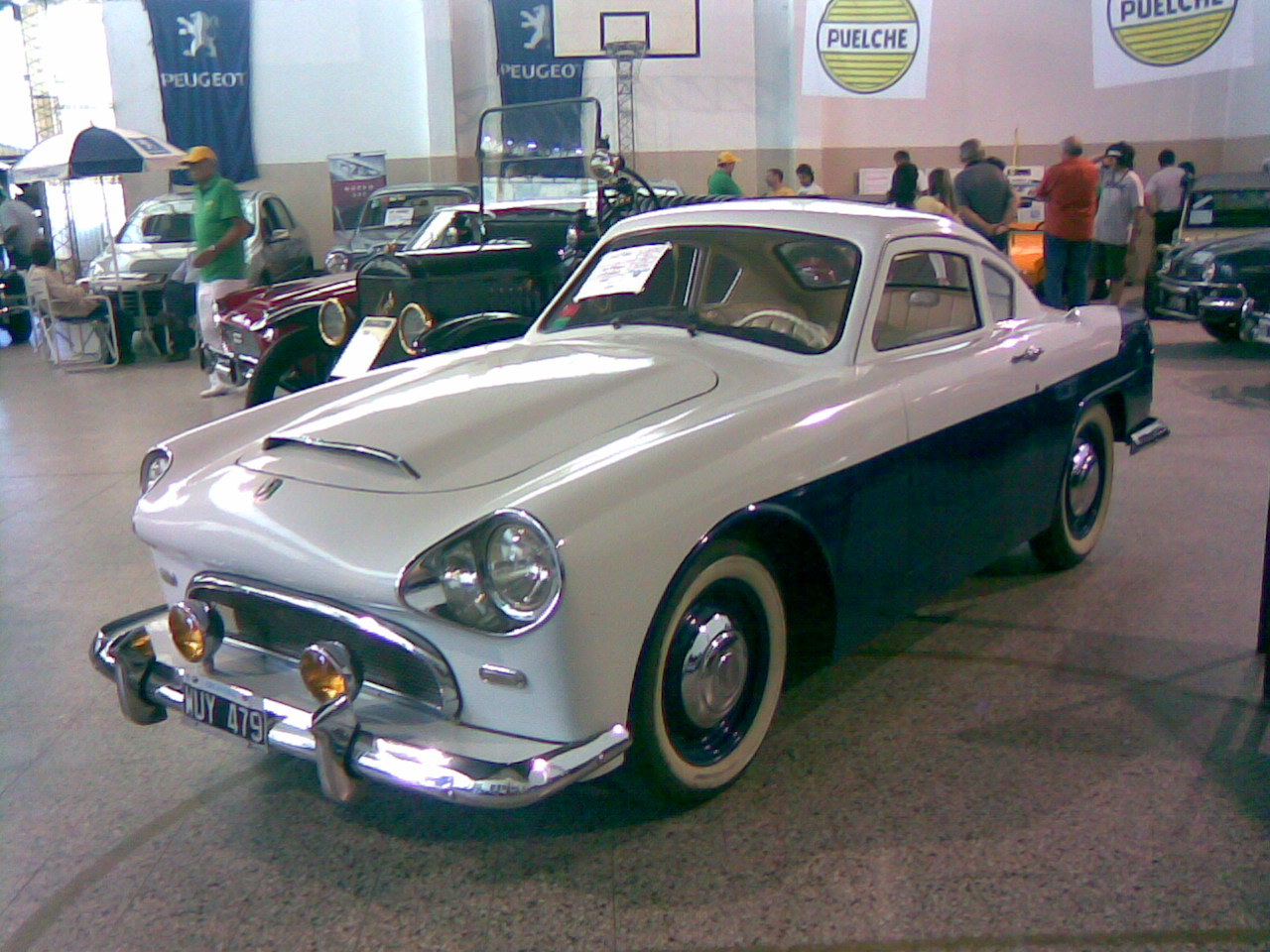
Designed and manufactured in Argentina, the Justicialist was part of Perón's effort to develop a local auto industry.

There were some significant changes on the economic area. Wages, which had increased considerably up to that point, were frozen as were prices through biennial contracts. The IAPI began to subsidize the agricultural sector again. The inflationary process was controlled.

The industrial branches privileged in this second stage of the import substitution process, of the second five-year plan were the automotive, oil and petrochemical, chemical, metallurgical and electrical and non-electrical machinery industries, aimed at being base industries for the country. Investments were oriented towards taking advantage of the possibilities offered by a protected internal market. The agricultural sector was modernized: from the development of the steel and petrochemical industry, modernization and the provision of fertilizers, pesticides and machinery were promoted, so that agricultural production and productivity increased. Also from 1953 to 1955 "Justicialista" automobiles were built, but after the fall of Perón production stopped and was never continued.

The Argentine Steel Plan and the constitution of the company SOMISA, which will go from a production of 21,000 tons of steel in 1948 to 87,000 in 1954. The Argentine company Siam gained great momentum, expanding mainly due to its sales in products such as scooters, fans and other appliances that the local market demanded. Its industrial capacity allowed it to start producing refrigerators in 1948 at a rate of 11,000 annually, reaching 70,000 units ten years later, becoming the largest Latin American company, with more than nine thousand employees.

On December 21, 1953, an act of economic union was signed between Argentina and Ecuador, and on September 9, 1954, another act of economic union was signed with Bolivia. The State Gas distribution company was created for the distribution of that resource. The first gas pipeline was launched that connected the city of Comodoro Rivadavia with the City of Buenos Aires, with a length of one thousand six hundred kilometers. It was inaugurated on December 29, 1949, being the first of its kind in South America and the longest in the world at that time; It was also built without external financing. But after the coup d'état of 1955, the valves and terminals were not built so that the gas pipeline would be able to transport gas to homes.

==== Second Five-Year Plan ====
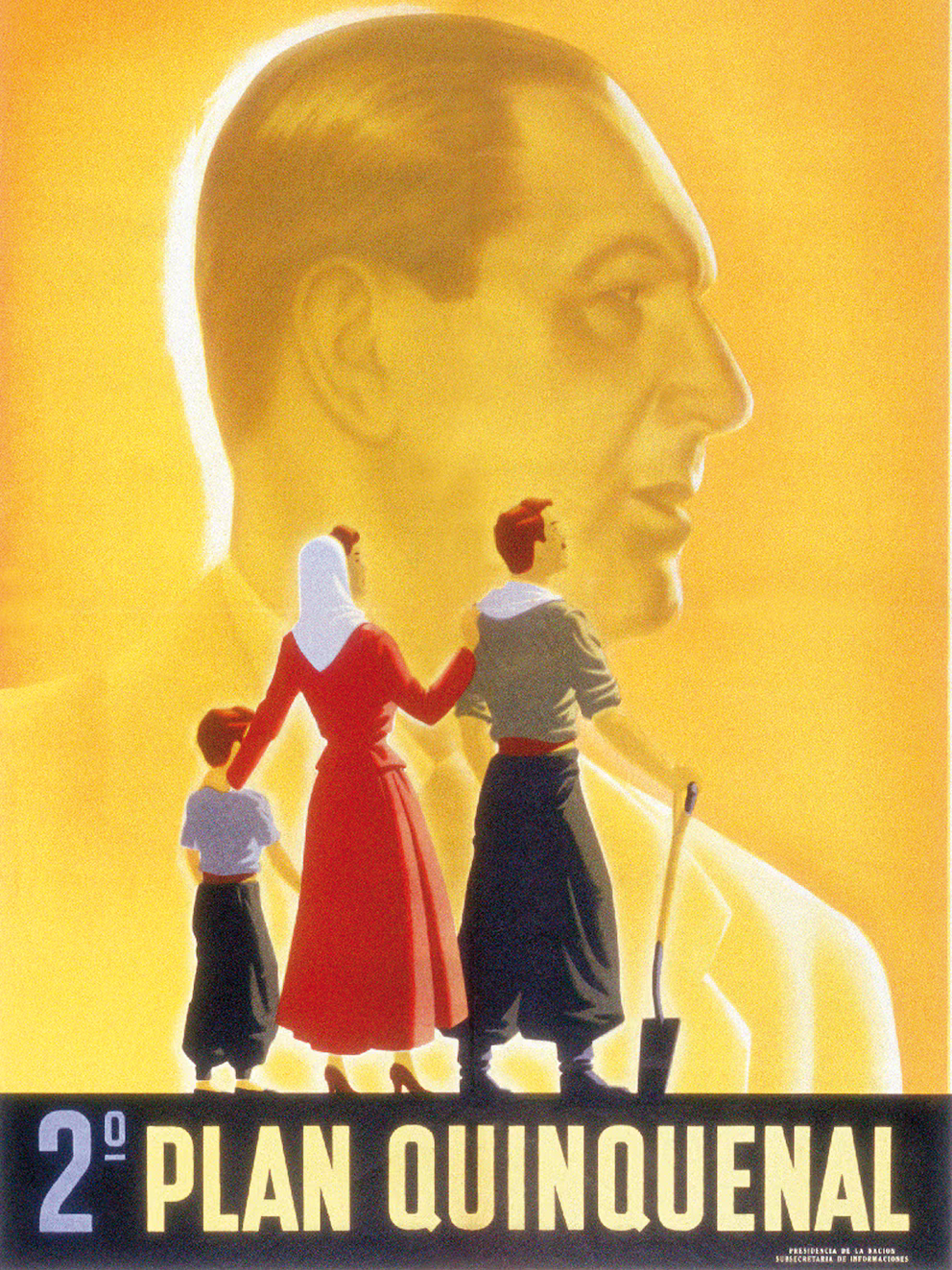
Propaganda for the Second Five-year Plan

The ambitious goal of energizing the domestic market, central to the First Five-Year Plan, was soon overshadowed by the emergence of numerous challenges. These obstacles necessitated a reconsideration of the strategies and policies implemented up to that point. While the plan sought to transcend the agro-export model and bolster industrial growth, manufactured goods failed to secure a strong position in international markets. This limitation, in turn, led to recurring balance-of-payments crises, undermining the positive trajectory of GDP growth and exposing the structural vulnerabilities of the economy.

This new approach reflected a more pragmatic and comprehensive vision for economic development, addressing the intertwined challenges of industrialization, external dependence, and agricultural stagnation. The Second Five-Year Plan symbolized a critical turning point, as it sought to strike a delicate balance between fostering growth, managing external vulnerabilities, and ensuring the sustainability of Argentina’s long-term economic goals.

One of the most significant weaknesses became evident in the area of foreign trade. The tools that had initially driven the First Five-Year Plan, such as the policies of the Argentine Institute for the Promotion of Exchange (I.A.P.I.), proved increasingly ineffective as export surpluses (particularly in the meat sector) dwindled. The impact of the Marshall Plan, had begun to restore European post-war economies and reduced their reliance on Argentine exports. These external difficulties translated into domestic economic pressures, as the nascent industrialization process demanded increasing amounts of foreign currency to import capital goods essential for growth. This marked the onset of a persistent pattern of external constraints, compelling the Peronist government to recalibrate its approach to economic development.

Another pressing issue that worsened the economic outlook was the stagnation of the agricultural sector. This stagnation stemmed from a combination of inconsistent policies and a lack of technological innovation, as most government initiatives favored urban industrial development over rural advancements (Falivene, 2018). Poor agricultural campaigns further limited the capacity to generate foreign exchange, which was crucial for financing the burgeoning industrial sector. Consequently, the agricultural sector’s stagnation not only hindered its own development but also created a bottleneck for the broader economic strategy, as industrial growth remained heavily dependent on external financing.

Faced with these interrelated challenges, the government shifted its focus towards a more development-oriented framework for the productive sectors. Among the key measures taken were:

- An emphasis on promoting heavy industry to strengthen the domestic production base.
- Active encouragement of foreign investment to supplement domestic capital shortages.
- The enactment of Law 14.122, designed to guarantee and attract foreign direct investment.
- The adoption of contractionary fiscal and monetary policies aimed at curbing inflation and stabilizing the economy.

Through these strategies, the government aimed not only to navigate the immediate difficulties but also to lay the groundwork for a more resilient and self-reliant economy in the years to come. The call for foreign capital with the purpose of developing heavy industry, was a source of controversy and attracted criticism from opponents, including future president Frondizi.

=== Education Policy ===
The University Law No. 14,297 enacted in 1954 replaced Law 13,031 of 1949. It was intended to adapt the university law of 1947 to the changes introduced by the National Constitution of 1949 and so add Peronist elements into the education system. The law introduced several key changes: it affirmed the principle of free university education, originally established by Decree 29,337/49; it defined the mission of national universities as being "eminently humanistic and socially supportive"; it formalized the concept of university extension; and it allowed the direct participation of students in university governance by granting them the right to vote.

=== Political Situation ===
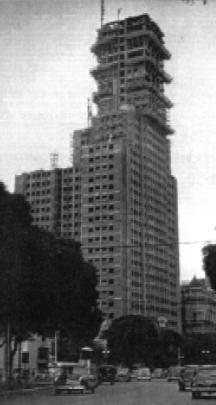
The Alas Building under construction

Before the 1951 elections, the Peronist government passed a controversial law that changed the electoral system for the legislature to a First-past-the-post. This system underrepresented minority parties compared to their share of the popular vote and could even prevent them from gaining any representation. In addition to this, opposition to Perón grew bolder following Eva Perón's death on 26 July 1952.

In 1953, society was definitively polarized because the government began to imprison opponents, censored all opposition media, and attempted to "Peronize" society, (impose Peronist ideas to society) enforcing The Reason for My Life in highschool programs, the obligation to join the Justicialist Party to public employees, school books praising the government, imposing the name "Eva Perón province" on the national territory of La Pampa, "President Perón province" on the national territory of Chaco, “Eva Perón City” to La Plata, etc.).

Perón called employers and unions to a Productivity Congress to regulate social conflict through dialogue, but the conference failed without reaching an agreement. Divisions among Peronists intensified, and the President's worsening mistrust led to the forced resignation of numerous valuable allies, notably Buenos Aires Province Governor Domingo Mercante. Again on the defensive, Perón accelerated generals' promotions and extended them pay hikes and other benefits. He also accelerated landmark construction projects slated for the CGT or government agencies; among these was the 41-story and 141 m (463 ft) high Alas Building (transferred to the Air Force by a later regime).

Terrorist acts by anti-Peronists would gradually begin, such as the Attack on the Plaza de Mayo on April 15, 1953, which occurred when the president was giving a speech. When the explosions were heard, Perón said that they should do something useful for the country instead of put bombs. Amid the chaos, Peronists civilians burned to the ground the Socialist Party headquarters and the aristocratic Jockey Club (both housed in magnificent turn-of-the-century Beaux-Arts buildings).

A stalemate of sorts ensued between Perón and his opposition and, despite austerity measures taken late in 1952 to remedy the country's unsustainable trade deficit, the president remained generally popular. In March 1954, Perón called a vice-presidential election to replace the late Hortensio Quijano, which his candidate won by a nearly two-to-one margin. Given what he felt was as solid a mandate as ever and with inflation in single digits and the economy on a more secure footing, Perón ventured into a new policy: the creation of incentives designed to attract foreign investment.

Drawn to an economy with the highest standard of living in Latin America and a new steel mill in San Nicolás de los Arroyos, automakers FIAT and Kaiser Motors responded to the initiative by breaking ground on new facilities in the city of Córdoba, as did the freight truck division of Daimler-Benz, the first such investments since General Motors' Argentine assembly line opened in 1926. Perón also signed an important exploration contract with Standard Oil of California, in May 1955, consolidating his new policy of substituting the two largest sources of that era's chronic trade deficits (imported petroleum and motor vehicles) with local production brought in through foreign investment. Arturo Frondizi, who had been the centrist Radical Civic Union's 1951 vice-presidential nominee, publicly condemned what he considered to be an anti-patriotic decision; as president three years later, however, he himself signed exploration contracts with foreign oil companies.

As 1954 drew to a close, Perón unveiled reforms far more controversial to the conservative Argentine sectors. In 1954 Perón achieved the sanction of law No. 14,394, whose article 31 included divorce. After the overthrow of Perón, this article was suspended by Decree Law 4070/1956 and divorce would only be accepted again in 1987 by Law No. 23515. On December 30, 1954, a decree authorized the opening of brothels, which were banned decades ago. The terms "legitimate" and "illegitimate" children were also eliminated, compulsory religious education was abolished, subsidies were removed from Catholic schools, and holidays were reduced, including numerous religious holidays, with the aim of increasing productivity and A reform of the Constitution for the Separation of Church and State was approved.

The Roman Catholic Church's Argentine leaders, whose support of Perón's government had been steadily waning since the advent of the Eva Perón Foundation, were now open antagonists of the man they called "the tyrant." Though much of Argentina's media had, since 1950, been either controlled or monitored by the administration, lurid pieces on his alleged relationship with an underage girl named Nélida Rivas (known as Nelly), filled the gossip pages. Pressed by reporters on whether his supposed new paramour was, as the magazines claimed, thirteen years of age, the fifty-nine-year-old Perón responded that he was "not superstitious." Later, while on exile, Perón commented on Nelly: "That young lady I met was a girl who attended the UES like many others. She is a child, and as a man I could not or cannot see in her anything other than what she is: a child. Because of my age, because of my experience, you can be sure that I did not transgress moral codes."

It is unknown whether the relationship between Nelly Rivas and Perón really took place. Victoria Allison considers the story a part of smear campaign against Perón conducted by the military junta of Pedro Eugenio Aramburu, which included similar charges and rumours about Perón. Silvana G. Ferreyra notes that despite the story being a popular talking point amongst anti-Peronist circles, the Argentinian public at large did not believe the allegations, writing: "As the years went by, the persistence of the Peronist identity among the popular classes was a clear sign of the ineffectiveness of these denunciations." Perón's biographer, Jill Hedges, argues that "the concept was hardly novel" in Argentina, and rumours of political figures having affairs with young girls in domestic service or similar positions were common, which did not make the story stand out amongst the other anti-Peronist allegations of the smear campaign. Perón was also accused of having sexual encounters with film stars during the 1954 Mar del Plata International Film Festival, and photos of him with the members of the women's branch of Secondary Students' Union (Spanish: Unión de Estudiantes Secundarios, UES) that Rivas belonged to sparked moralistic critique already before the allegation of his romance with her was made. Anti-Peronist media mocked Perón for posing with the women of the UES, claiming that he was trying to "forget the irreparable absence [of Eva Perón]"; shortly afterwards, gossip of Perón's alleged relationship with Rivas appeared for the first time.

Before long, however, the president's humor on the subject ran out and, following the expulsion of two Catholic priests he believed to be behind his recent image problems, a 15 June 1955 declaration of the Sacred Consistorial Congregation (not of Pope Pius XII himself, who alone had authority to excommunicate a head of state) was interpreted as declaring Perón excommunicated. The following day, Perón called for a rally of support on the Plaza de Mayo, a time-honored custom among Argentine presidents during a challenge. However, as he spoke before a crowd of thousands, Navy fighter jets flew overhead and dropped bombs into the crowded square below before seeking refuge in Uruguay.

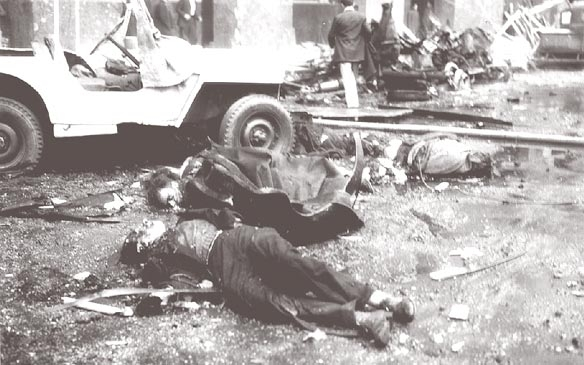
Scene in the Plaza de Mayo following a failed coup attempt against Perón, 16 June 1955. He was deposed three months later.

The incident, part of a coup attempt against Perón, killed 364 people and was, from a historical perspective, the only air assault ever on Argentine soil, as well as a portent of the mayhem that Argentine society would suffer in the 1970s. It moreover touched off a wave of reprisals on the part of Peronists. Reminiscent of the incidents in 1953, Peronist crowds ransacked eleven Buenos Aires churches, including the Metropolitan Cathedral. On 16 September 1955, a nationalist Catholic group from both the Army and Navy, led by General Eduardo Lonardi, General Pedro E. Aramburu, and Admiral Isaac Rojas, led a revolt from Córdoba. They took power in a coup three days later, which they named Revolución Libertadora (the "Liberating Revolution"). Perón barely escaped with his life and fled on the gunboat ARP Paraguay provided by Paraguayan leader Alfredo Stroessner, up the Paraná River. On his way to the port, Perón's car broke down which forced him to ask an astonished bus driver to help tow it through the rain.

At that point Argentina was more politically polarized than it had been since 1880. The landowning elites and other conservatives pointed to an exchange rate that had rocketed from 4 to 30 pesos per dollar and consumer prices that had risen nearly fivefold. Employers and moderates generally agreed, qualifying that with the fact the economy had grown by over 40% (the best showing since the 1920s). The underprivileged and humanitarians looked back upon the era as one in which real wages grew by over a third and better working conditions arrived alongside benefits like pensions, health care, paid vacations and the construction of record numbers of needed schools, hospitals, works of infrastructure and housing.
