= United Nations Security Council Resolution 65 =

UN Security Council Resolution 65
- Date: December 28 1948
- Meeting no.: 395
- Code: S/1165 (Document)
- Subject: The Indonesian Question
- Voting summary: 9 voted for; None voted against; 2 abstained
- Result: Adopted

Security Council composition
- Permanent members: China; France; Soviet Union; United Kingdom; United States
- Non-permanent members: Argentina; Belgium; Canada; Colombia; Syria; Ukrainian SSR

United Nations Security Council Resolution 65, adopted on December 28, 1948, requested that the consular representatives in Batavia referred to in United Nations Security Council Resolution 30 send a complete report on the situation in the Republic of Indonesia, covering the observance of ceasefire orders and the conditions prevailing in areas under military occupation or from which armed forces now in occupation may be withdrawn.

The resolution was adopted with nine votes to none; the Ukrainian SSR and Soviet Union abstained.

== See also ==
- United Nations Security Council Resolution 63
- List of United Nations Security Council Resolutions 1 to 100 (1946–1953)
