= United Nations Security Council Resolution 64 =

UN Security Council Resolution 64
- Date: December 28 1948
- Meeting no.: 395
- Code: S/1164 (Document)
- Subject: The Indonesian Question
- Voting summary: 8 voted for; None voted against; 3 abstained
- Result: Adopted

Security Council composition
- Permanent members: China; France; Soviet Union; United Kingdom; United States
- Non-permanent members: Argentina; Belgium; Canada; Colombia; Syria; Ukrainian SSR

United Nations Security Council Resolution 64, adopted on December 28, 1948, noted that the Netherlands had not complied with the demands to release the President of the Republic of Indonesia and other political prisoners as issued in United Nations Security Council Resolution 63. The Resolution demanded that the Netherlands set free these prisoners forthwith and report to the Council within 24 hours.

The resolution passed with eight votes in favour. Belgium, France and the United Kingdom abstained.

== See also ==
- United Nations Security Council Resolution 65
- List of United Nations Security Council Resolutions 1 to 100 (1946–1953)
