= United Nations Security Council Resolution 67 =

United Nations Security Council resolution

UN Security Council Resolution 67
- Date: January 28 1949
- Meeting no.: 406
- Code: S/1234 (Document)
- Subject: The Indonesian Question
- Result: Adopted

Security Council composition
- Permanent members: China; France; Soviet Union; United Kingdom; United States
- Non-permanent members: Argentina; Canada; Cuba; Egypt; Norway; Ukrainian SSR

United Nations Security Council Resolution 67, adopted on January 28, 1949, satisfied that both parties in the Indonesian Conflict continued to adhere to the principles of the Renville Agreement, the Council called upon the Netherlands to immediately discontinue all military operations and upon the Indonesian Republic to order its armed adherents to cease guerrilla warfare and for both parties to cooperate in the restoration of peace and the maintenance of law and order throughout the area. The Council further called upon the Netherlands to release all political prisoners arrested since December 17, 1948 and to facilitate the immediate return of officials of the Government of the Republic of Indonesia to Jogjakarta and afford to them such facilities as may reasonably be required by that Government for its effective functioning in that area.

The Resolution then called for the creation of a federal 'United States of Indonesia' in which elections for constituents to a constituent assembly would be completed by October 1949 and to whom the Netherlands would transfer sovereignty of Indonesia to by July 1950. To that end the Council renamed the Committee of Good Offices to the United Nations Commission for Indonesia and charged it with all the duties of the old Committee as well as the observation of elections and guaranteeing freedom of assembly, speech and publication along with supervising the transfer of parts of Indonesia to the Republican Government and issuing periodic reports to the Council.

The resolution was voted on in parts; no vote was taken on the text as a whole.

== United Nations Commissions ==
=== United Nations Good Offices Commission (1947) ===
Good Offices Commission (Note: also spelled Committee of Good Offices) (Indonesian: Komisi Tiga Negara, "Commission of Three Countries") was a United Nations commission established in August 25, 1947 on the basis of the United Nations Security Council Resolution 31 as a mediator for the conflict between the newly established Republic of Indonesia and the Kingdom of the Netherlands.

The Committee of Good Offices consisted of three countries, each countries were chosen by both Indonesia and the Netherlands as a representatives and mediator for a ceasefire and peace agreement. The countries were The United States, chosen by both sides as a mediator, Belgium, chosen by the Dutch side, and Australia, chosen by Indonesian side. The United States was represented by Frank Porter Graham, Belgium was represented by Paul Van Zeeland, and Australia was represented by Richard C. Kirby.

The UN Good Offices Commission was the first UN peacekeeping mission for Australia.

=== United Nations Commission for Indonesia ===
The United Nations Commission for Indonesia (Abbreviated: UNCI; Indonesian: Komisi PBB untuk Indonesia) was a United Nations commission formed to replace the Good Offices Commission. The purpose of UNCI was to continue the duties of the previous commission, while at the same time overseeing the handover of the Indonesian territory to the republican government and reporting regularly to the United Nations Security Council. UNCI was formed after the Good Offices Commission was deemed to have failed to reconcile the conflict. UNCI played an important role in the Dutch–Indonesian Round Table Conference.

== See also ==
- List of United Nations Security Council Resolutions 1 to 100 (1946–1953)
