= United Nations Security Council Resolution 63 =

UN Security Council Resolution 63
- Date: December 24 1948
- Meeting no.: 392
- Code: S/1150 (Document)
- Subject: The Indonesian Question
- Voting summary: 7 voted for; None voted against; 4 abstained
- Result: Adopted

Security Council composition
- Permanent members: China; France; Soviet Union; United Kingdom; United States
- Non-permanent members: Argentina; Belgium; Canada; Colombia; Syria; Ukrainian SSR

United Nations Security Council Resolution 63, adopted on December 24, 1948, in response to a report by the Committee of Good Offices the Council called upon the parties to cease hostilities and to release the President of the Republic of Indonesia and other political prisoners arrested since December 18, 1948.

The council further instructed the Committee to report to it fully and urgently by telegraph on the events which have transpired since December 12, 1948 and to report to the Council on the compliance of the involved parties to its demands.

The resolution was adopted by seven votes to none; Belgium, France, the Ukrainian SSR and Soviet Union abstained.

== See also ==
- Indonesian National Revolution
- List of United Nations Security Council Resolutions 1 to 100 (1946–1953)
- United Nations Security Council Resolution 64
