= United Nations Security Council Resolution 961 =

UN Security Council Resolution 961
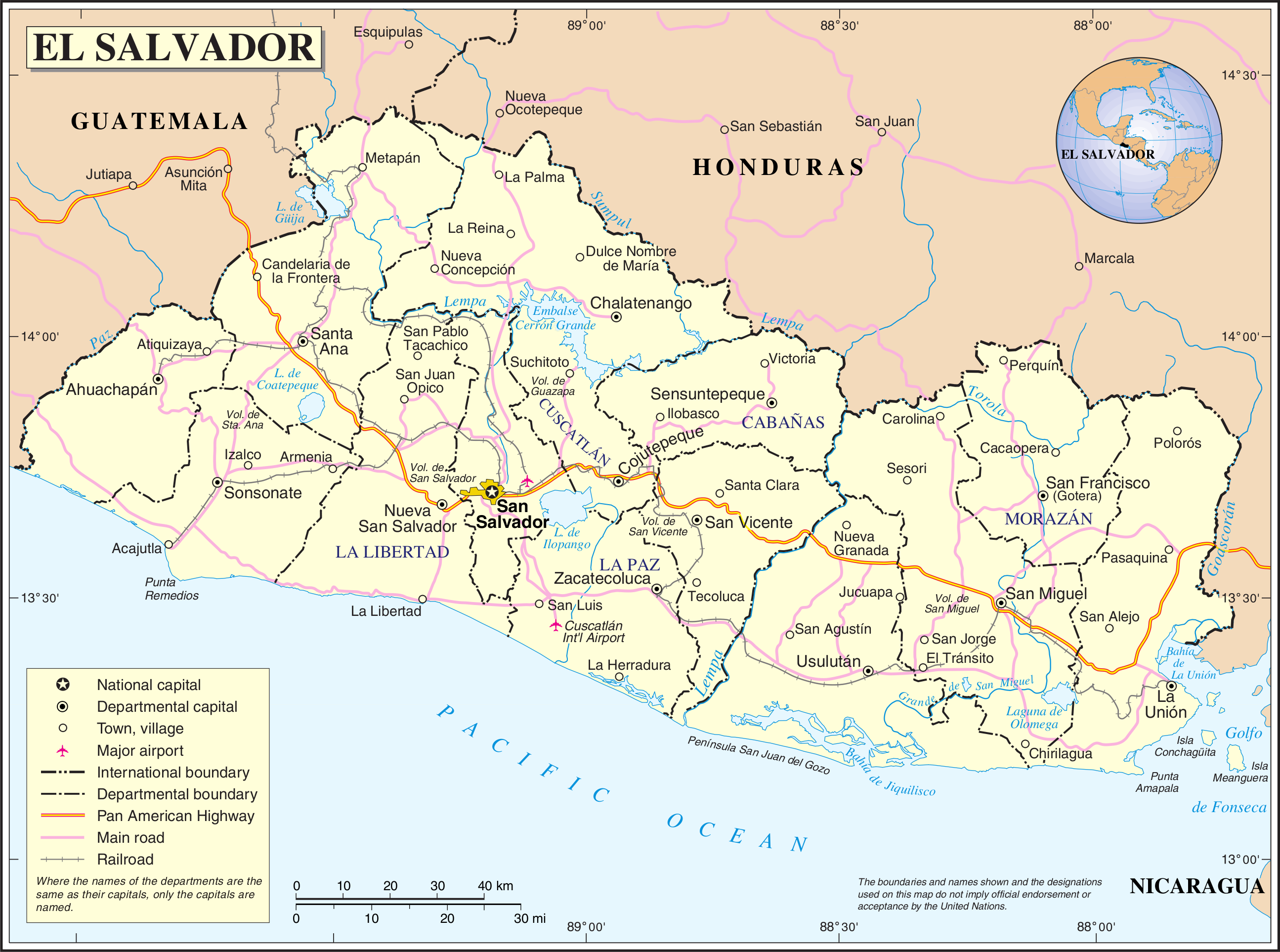
- El Salvador
- Date: 23 November 1994
- Meeting no.: 3,465
- Code: S/RES/961 (Document)
- Subject: El Salvador
- Voting summary: 15 voted for; None voted against; None abstained
- Result: Adopted

Security Council composition
- Permanent members: China; France; Russia; United Kingdom; United States
- Non-permanent members: Argentina; Brazil; Czech Republic; Djibouti; New Zealand; Nigeria; Oman; Pakistan; Rwanda; Spain

United Nations Security Council resolution 961 was adopted unanimously on 23 November 1994, after recalling resolutions 637 (1989), 693 (1991), 714 (1991), 729 (1992), 784 (1992), 791 (1992), 832 (1993), 888 (1993) and 920 (1994), the council discussed the implementation of peace agreements in El Salvador and extended the mandate of the United Nations Observer Mission in El Salvador (ONUSAL) for a final time until 30 April 1995.

The council was concerned at delays in implementing parts of the Peace Accords, especially those regarding the demobilisation of police and transfer of lands, judicial reform, reintegration programmes for ex-combatants and recommendations of the Commission on the Truth. The efforts of ONUSAL were commended to support the full implementation of the agreements signed by the Government of El Salvador and Farabundo Martí National Liberation Front (FMLN).

While affirming the importance of implementing such agreements, the council also asked for the findings of the Joint Group for Investigation of Politically Motivated Illegal Armed Groups to be followed up. All parties were called upon to co-operate with the Special Representative of the Secretary-General Boutros Boutros-Ghali in verifying the implementation of agreements, and the Government of El Salvador and the FMLN required to complete the implementation of agreements.

All states and international institutions were urged to contribute to the implementation of the Peace Accords. The secretary-general was requested to report on the mandate and withdrawal of ONUSAL by 31 March 1995. Finally, the aim of the United Nations to ensure the implementation of the Peace Accords was stressed.

== See also ==
- List of United Nations Security Council Resolutions 901 to 1000 (1994–1995)
- Salvadoran Civil War
- Salvadoran legislative election, 1994
- Salvadoran presidential election, 1994
- United Nations Observer Group in Central America
