= United Nations Security Council Resolution 792 =

UN Security Council Resolution 792
- Date: 30 November 1992
- Meeting no.: 3,143
- Code: S/RES/792 (Document)
- Subject: The situation in Cambodia
- Voting summary: 14 voted for; None voted against; 1 abstained
- Result: Adopted

Security Council composition
- Permanent members: China; France; Russia; United Kingdom; United States
- Non-permanent members: Austria; Belgium; Cape Verde; Ecuador; Hungary; India; Japan; Morocco; Venezuela; Zimbabwe

United Nations Security Council resolution 792, adopted on 30 November 1992, after recalling resolutions 668 (1990), 717 (1991), 718 (1991), 728 (1992), 745 (1992), 766 (1992) and 783 (1992) noting a report by the Secretary-General Boutros Boutros-Ghali, the Council concerned itself with preparations for the 1993 elections in Cambodia by the United Nations Transitional Authority in Cambodia (UNTAC) while condemning the refusal of the Party of Democratic Kampuchea to co-operate.

The Council determined that preparations for the elections, scheduled for May 1993, would proceed in all areas of Cambodia to which UNTAC had full and free access as at 31 January 1993, and called upon all Cambodian parties– Funcinpec, Khmer People's National Liberation Front, the Party of Democratic Kampuchea and Party of the State of Cambodia, to co-operate with UNTAC and establish a neutral political environment for the conduct of free and fair elections with no intimidation, harassment or political violence. It also called on the Supreme National Council to meet regularly under the chairmanship of Prince Norodom Sihanouk.

The resolution then went on to condemn the Party of Democratic Kampuchea (PDK) for its failure to meet its obligations, demanding that it do so under the Paris Agreements as every other party had. It made specific mention that it facilitate full deployment of UNTAC in the areas under its control immediately and not impede voter registration in those area; that it not impede on other political parties in the areas and that it implement fully phase II of the cease-fire, particularly with regard to cantonment and demobilisation. It also urged the PDK to join fully in the implementation of the Paris Agreements including electoral provisions and requesting that the Secretary-General and states remain open to dialogue with the PDK for this purpose. In this regard, the council also called for measures on parties not co-operating with UNTAC to prevent the supply of petroleum products to those parties, announcing it would consider further measures if the PDK continued its refusal to co-operate, including the freezing of its assets held outside Cambodia.

The council then invited UNTAC to establish all necessary border checkpoints and requested states to co-operate in both the establishment and maintenance of the checkpoints. It also supported a decision by the Supreme National Council to set a moratorium on the export of logs from Cambodia in order to protect the country's natural resources, calling on all states, particularly neighbouring states, to respect that moratorium and requesting the Supreme National Council to consider a similar measure relating to the export of minerals and gems.

Finally, the resolution urged all parties to observe the ceasefire, take effective measures against banditry and arms smuggling and protect UNTAC personnel. It further requested the Secretary-General the implications for the electoral process if the PDK continued refusal to co-operate, and to report to the council on developments no later than 15 February 1993. Despite the passing of the resolution, the PDK did not co-operate and killed 13 Vietnamese citizens in December 1992, attacked United Nations personnel and rejected the United Nations peace plan.

Resolution 792 was adopted by 14 votes to none, with one abstention from China, which had expressed concerns that an election without the Party of Democratic Kampuchea (Khmer Rouge) would be "harmful" to the peace process.

== See also ==
- List of United Nations Security Council Resolutions 701 to 800 (1991–1993)
- Modern Cambodia
- Transition of the People's Republic of Kampuchea to Cambodia
