= United Nations Security Council Resolution 920 =

UN Security Council Resolution 920
- ONUSAL medal bar
- Date: 26 May 1994
- Meeting no.: 3,381
- Code: S/RES/920 (Document)
- Subject: The situation in El Salvador
- Voting summary: 15 voted for; None voted against; None abstained
- Result: Adopted

Security Council composition
- Permanent members: China; France; Russia; United Kingdom; United States
- Non-permanent members: Argentina; Brazil; Czech Republic; Djibouti; New Zealand; Nigeria; Oman; Pakistan; Rwanda; Spain

United Nations Security Council resolution 920, adopted unanimously on 26 May 1994, after recalling resolutions 637 (1989), 693 (1991), 714 (1991), 729 (1992), 784 (1992), 791 (1992), 832 (1993), 888 (1993), the council discussed the implementation of peace agreements in El Salvador and extended the mandate of the United Nations Observer Mission in El Salvador (ONUSAL) until 30 November 1994.

The successful completion of the electoral process in the country was welcomed, despite some minor irregularities. The efforts of the Secretary-General Boutros Boutros-Ghali to support the implementation of the agreements signed by the Government of El Salvador and Farabundo Martí National Liberation Front (FMLN) was welcomed. It was noted that there had been significant advances in the process of national reconciliation, but there was concern at delays in fully implementing parts of the peace accords. In this context an agreement to implement the most important parts of the accords by the parties was welcomed.

The council welcomed that the elections were held in a free, fair and secure environment. All parties were called upon to co-operate with the secretary-general and ONUSAL to implement the remaining parts of the peace accords, requesting that the secretary-general report to the council by 31 August 1994 on the progress made in implementation. In particular, progress had to be made on the police and public security provisions of the accords with regard to demobilisation and enhancing the character of the National Civil Police. The parties were also urged to remove obstacles to land transfer programmes, accelerate reintegration programmes for ex-combatants from both sides and implement recommendations by the Commission of Truth.

Finally, all countries and developmental and financial institutions were urged to contribute to the peace process in El Salvador, requesting the secretary-general to report back by 1 November 1994 on the withdrawal of ONUSAL and completion of its mandate.

== See also ==
- List of United Nations Security Council Resolutions 901 to 1000 (1994–1995)
- Salvadoran Civil War
- Salvadoran legislative election, 1994
- Salvadoran presidential election, 1994
- United Nations Observer Group in Central America
