= United Nations Security Council Resolution 783 =

UN Security Council Resolution 783
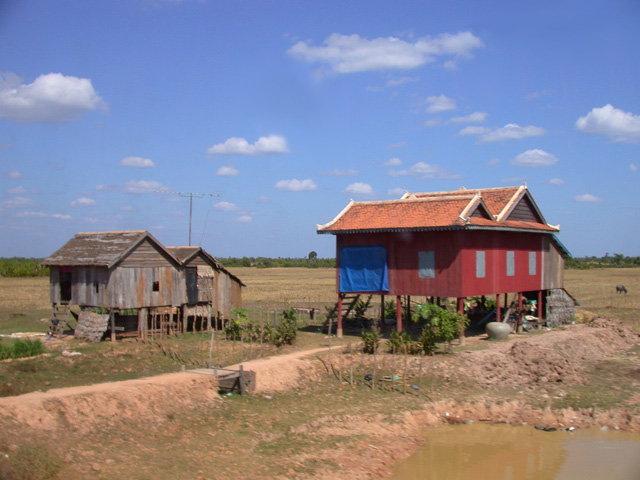
- Rural Cambodia
- Date: 13 October 1992
- Meeting no.: 3,124
- Code: S/RES/783 (Document)
- Subject: The situation in Cambodia
- Voting summary: 15 voted for; None voted against; None abstained
- Result: Adopted

Security Council composition
- Permanent members: China; France; Russia; United Kingdom; United States
- Non-permanent members: Austria; Belgium; Cape Verde; Ecuador; Hungary; India; Japan; Morocco; Venezuela; Zimbabwe

United Nations Security Council resolution 783, adopted unanimously on 13 October 1992, after recalling resolutions 668 (1990), 717 (1991), 718 (1991), 728 (1992), 745 (1992) and 766 (1992) and noting a report by the Secretary-General Boutros Boutros-Ghali, the council welcomed the progress the United Nations Transitional Authority in Cambodia (UNTAC) had made in Cambodia in accordance with the Paris Agreements, however it recognised various security and economic concerns facing UNTAC.

After also welcoming efforts by the governments of Thailand and Japan, the special representative and secretary-general to assist in the political settlement in Cambodia, the council reaffirmed that elections to a constituent assembly will take place no later than May 1993, according to schedule. While the resolution commended the Funcinpec, State of Cambodia and Khmer People's National Liberation Front for the co-operation with UNTAC, it condemned the Party of Democratic Kampuchea for its refusal to comply with its obligations. The council demanded that the Party of Democratic Kampuchea immediately fulfil its obligations and implement phase II of the United Nations plan referring to cantonment and demobilisation and allow UNTAC to take authority in areas under the control of the party.

The council then demanded full observation of the ceasefire, with all parties co-operating with UNTAC to identify minefields and facilitate investigations into reports of foreign forces, assistance and ceasefire violations within territory under their control. Throughout this, the resolution urged the protection of all United Nations personnel.

Resolution 783 then discussed preparations for the election. It emphasised the need for the elections to be held in a neutral political environment, requesting the UNTAC radio broadcast utility be established without delay with access to all Cambodian territory, also encouraging the secretary-general and special representative to make use of the possibilities offered by UNTAC's mandate, including measures to improve the effectiveness of the civil police in resolving growing problems relating to the maintenance of law and order. The establishment of Radio UNTAC increasingly affected the political mood in the country.

The resolution also invited member states and financial institutions to make available contributions they had announced at a conference in Tokyo on 22 June 1992, inviting in particular the governments of Japan and Thailand in cooperation with the co-chairmen and in consultation with any other Government as appropriate, to continue their efforts in an attempt to find solutions to the problems regarding the implementation of the Paris Agreements.

Finally, Resolution 783 required the secretary-general to report back to the security council as soon as possible, and no later than 15 November 1992 concerning the implementation of the current resolution, while considering further possibilities to any continuing problems.

== See also ==
- List of United Nations Security Council Resolutions 701 to 800 (1991–1993)
- Modern Cambodia
- Transition of the People's Republic of Kampuchea to Cambodia
