= United Nations Security Council Resolution 888 =

UN Security Council Resolution 888
- Flag of the FMLN
- Date: 30 November 1993
- Meeting no.: 3,321
- Code: S/RES/888 (Document)
- Subject: The situation in El Salvador
- Voting summary: 15 voted for; None voted against; None abstained
- Result: Adopted

Security Council composition
- Permanent members: China; France; Russia; United Kingdom; United States
- Non-permanent members: Brazil; Cape Verde; Djibouti; Hungary; Japan; Morocco; New Zealand; Pakistan; Spain; Venezuela

United Nations Security Council resolution 888, adopted unanimously on 30 November 1993, after recalling resolutions 637 (1989), 693 (1991), 714 (1991), 729 (1992), 784 (1992), 791 (1992) and 832 (1993), the council expressed concern at aspects of the situation in El Salvador and extended the mandate of the United Nations Observer Mission in El Salvador (ONUSAL) until 31 May 1994.

The Secretary-General Boutros Boutros-Ghali had reported that the peace process in El Salvador had advanced, an announcement welcomed by the council. However, concern was expressed at the delay in issues relating to the transfer of land, reintegration of ex-combatants, deployment of new police and the recommendations of the Commission on the Truth. There was also concern about recent violence and its implications for the peace process and the elections of March 1994, which may negatively affect the peace process if left unchecked.

Investigations by the secretary-general and the Government of El Salvador into illegal armed groups and their possible association with the violence was welcomed. At the same time, the security council was concerned about the politically motivated murders of members of parties including the Farabundo Martí National Liberation Front (FMLN) and the Alianza Republicana Nacionalista (ARENA). For the council, El Salvador was in a critical phase and indicated that the elections should be held in a free, fair and peaceful atmosphere. In this regard, statements the presidential candidates concerning peace and stability were welcomed.

The security council condemned the recent violence in the country and the partial implementation of important acts of the peace agreement, calling on the Government of El Salvador and FMLN to make efforts to prevent political violence and fulfill their obligations under the peace accords. Support was reaffirmed for the secretary-general, in co-operation with the Government of El Salvador concerning the opening of an investigation into illegal armed groups in El Salvador. All parties were also urged to co-operate with the secretary-general's special representative and ONUSAL in implementing the peace accords.

The need to recover weapons from private individuals in opposition to the peace accords was stressed, while remaining issues relating to the implementation of a land transfer programme and reintegration programmes for ex-combatants from both sides were urged to be resolved. After extending ONUSAL's mandate until 31 May 1994, the council concluded by requesting the secretary-general to report on developments in El Salvador and the operations of ONUSAL so that its size and mandate could be reviewed for the period after the end of its current mandate.

== See also ==
- List of United Nations Security Council Resolutions 801 to 900 (1993–1994)
- Salvadoran Civil War
- Salvadoran legislative election, 1994
- Salvadoran presidential election, 1994
- United Nations Observer Group in Central America
