= United Nations Security Council Resolution 766 =

UN Security Council Resolution 766
- Flag of Cambodia under UNTAC
- Date: 21 July 1992
- Meeting no.: 3,099
- Code: S/RES/766 (Document)
- Subject: The situation in Cambodia
- Voting summary: 15 voted for; None voted against; None abstained
- Result: Adopted

Security Council composition
- Permanent members: China; France; Russia; United Kingdom; United States
- Non-permanent members: Austria; Belgium; Cape Verde; Ecuador; Hungary; India; Japan; Morocco; Venezuela; Zimbabwe

United Nations Security Council resolution 766, adopted unanimously on 21 July 1992, after recalling resolutions 668 (1990), 717 (1991), 718 (1991), 728 (1992) and 745 (1992), the Council acknowledged and expressed its concern at the difficulties experienced by the United Nations Transitional Authority in Cambodia (UNTAC) in the implementation of a political settlement in Cambodia signed at the Paris Conference on 23 October 1991.

The Council deplored the continuing violations of the ceasefire in Cambodia, calling on all parties to cease from hostilities immediately and assist in the identification of land mines and in other areas. At the same time, it condemned the refusal by the Party of Democratic Kampuchea to allow the deployment of UNTAC to areas under its control, urging it do so, so that phase two of the United Nations plan can be fully implemented. It reaffirmed the international community's commitment to the political process under UNTAC, urging all parties to respect its peaceful nature and to Member States to provide assistance to the Authority.

The resolution also requested the Secretary-General Boutros Boutros-Ghali to accelerate the deployment of civilian components, especially those involved in the supervision and control of administrative structures. With regard to the lack of co-operation by the Party of Democratic Kampuchea, the Council declared that the benefits of international assistance will only apply to those parties which fulfil their obligations under the Paris agreements. However, in his report, the Secretary-General recognised that the cantonment process of Cambodian soldiers could not fully take place with the support of only three factions.

== See also ==
- List of United Nations Security Council Resolutions 701 to 800 (1991–1993)
- Modern Cambodia
- Transition of the People's Republic of Kampuchea to Cambodia
