= United Nations Security Council Resolution 832 =

UN Security Council Resolution 832
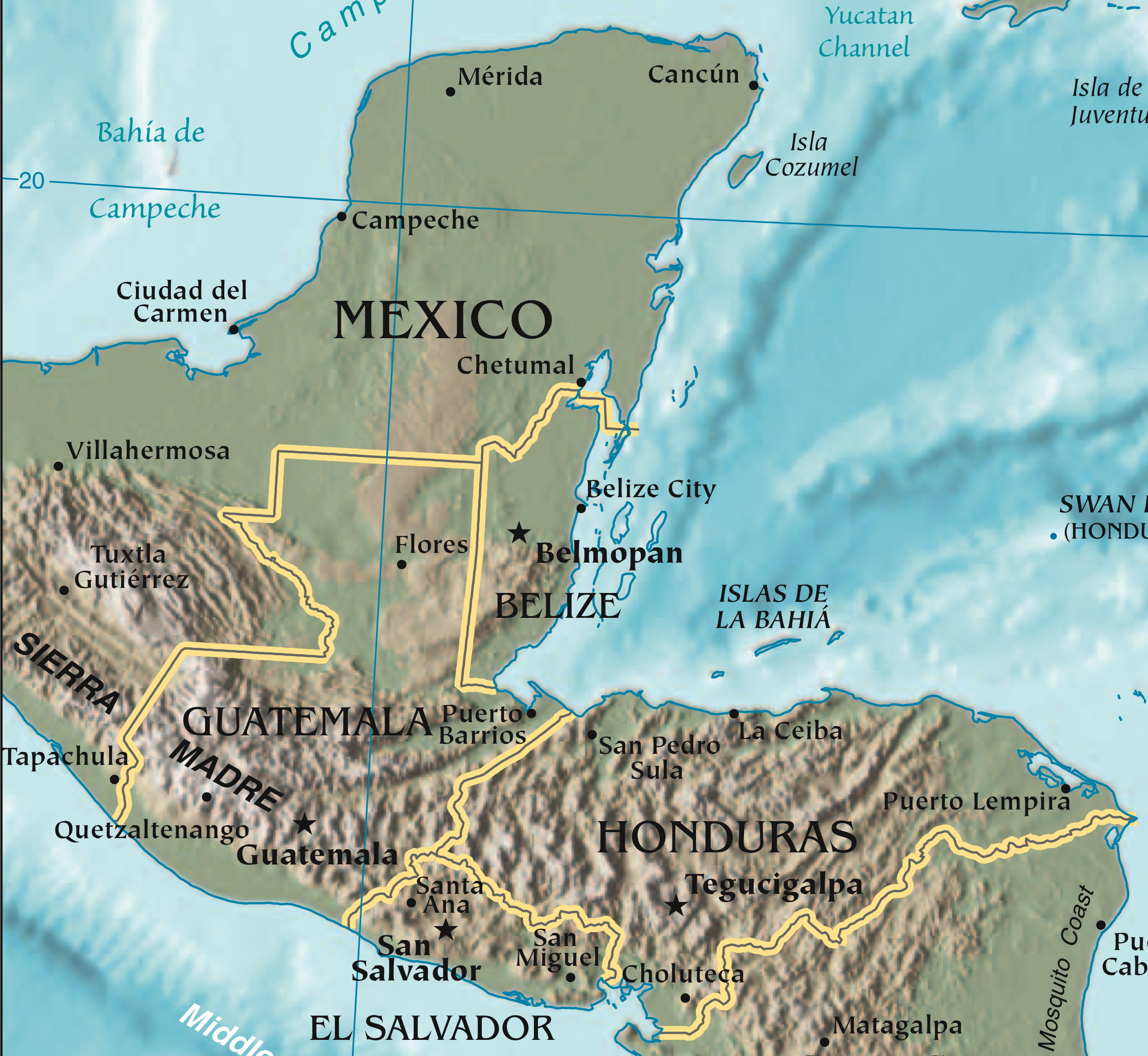
- El Salvador within Central America
- Date: 27 May 1993
- Meeting no.: 3,223
- Code: S/RES/832 (Document)
- Subject: El Salvador
- Voting summary: 15 voted for; None voted against; None abstained
- Result: Adopted

Security Council composition
- Permanent members: China; France; Russia; United Kingdom; United States
- Non-permanent members: Brazil; Cape Verde; Djibouti; Hungary; Japan; Morocco; New Zealand; Pakistan; Spain; Venezuela

United Nations Security Council resolution 832, adopted unanimously on 27 May 1993, after recalling resolutions 637 (1989), 693 (1991), 714 (1991), 729 (1992), 784 (1992) and 791 (1992), the council noted a report by the Secretary-General Boutros Boutros-Ghali and enlarged the mandate of the United Nations Observer Mission in El Salvador (ONUSAL) to include the observation of the electoral process.

The council welcomed the secretary-general's efforts to support the full implementation of agreements between El Salvador and the Farabundo Martí National Liberation Front (FNLM). It also noted that, sixteen months after the ceasefire was announced, the peace process had advanced significantly and emphasised that remaining problems do not become obstacles to the peace process. El Salvador, the council noted, had asked the United Nations to monitor the elections that were to take place in March 1994 and the United Nations accepted the invitation.

The security council decided to enlarge the mandate of ONUSAL to include the observation of elections in March 1994 and, at the same time, extended its mandate until 30 November 1993. It would also oversee the creation of an election commission. The council also took the position of the secretary-general that the election would be the culmination of the whole peace process in El Salvador.

The resolution urged the government of El Salvador and the FNLM keep to the agreements under the Peace Accords, including the transfer of land, the reintegration of ex-combatants and wounded, the deployment of civilian police, the phasing out of the Policía Nacional (National Police) and the purification of the army and the Truth Commission.

All countries were asked to contribute to the peace process in El Salvador, and the secretary-general was requested to keep the council informed of further developments before the expiry of the new mandate period.

== See also ==
- List of United Nations Security Council Resolutions 801 to 900 (1993–1994)
- Salvadoran Civil War
- Salvadoran legislative election, 1994
- Salvadoran presidential election, 1994
- United Nations Observer Group in Central America
