= United Nations Security Council Resolution 711 =

United Nations Security Council resolution

UN Security Council Resolution 711
- Location of Lithuania
- Date: 12 September 1991
- Meeting no.: 3,007
- Code: S/RES/711 (Document)
- Subject: Admission of new Members to the UN: Lithuania
- Result: Adopted

Security Council composition
- Permanent members: China; France; Soviet Union; United Kingdom; United States
- Non-permanent members: Austria; Belgium; Côte d'Ivoire; Cuba; Ecuador; India; Romania; Yemen; Zaire; Zimbabwe

United Nations Security Council resolution 711, adopted without a vote on 12 September 1991, after examining the application of the Republic of Lithuania for membership in the United Nations, the Council recommended to the General Assembly that Lithuania be admitted.

On the same day the Council adopted identical resolutions 709 regarding Estonia and 710 regarding Latvia. The three Baltic states were soviet socialist republics of the Soviet Union since 1945. In 1990 they declared independence and the UN resolutions were an important international recognition of their claim of independence. The resolutions were passed after the August Putsch in Moscow, which precipitated the collapse of the Soviet Union.

On 17 September 1991, the General Assembly admitted Lithuania under Resolution 46/6.

== See also ==
- List of United Nations member states
- List of United Nations Security Council Resolutions 701 to 800 (1991–1993)
