= United Nations Security Council Resolution 789 =

UN Security Council Resolution 789
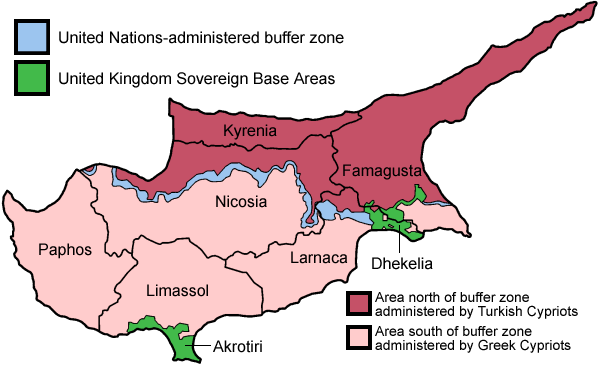
- Divided Cyprus
- Date: 25 November 1992
- Meeting no.: 3,140
- Code: S/RES/789 (Document)
- Subject: Cyprus
- Voting summary: 15 voted for; None voted against; None abstained
- Result: Adopted

Security Council composition
- Permanent members: China; France; Russia; United Kingdom; United States
- Non-permanent members: Austria; Belgium; Cape Verde; Ecuador; Hungary; India; Japan; Morocco; Venezuela; Zimbabwe

United Nations Security Council resolution 789, adopted unanimously on 25 November 1992, after reaffirming resolutions on Cyprus including 365 (1974), 367 (1975), 541 (1983), 550 (1984) and 774 (1992) and noting a report by the Secretary-General, the Council urged all concerned to implement a set of confidence-building measures.

The Council reaffirmed its endorsement of the "Set of Ideas" and that the current status quo is not acceptable. It also called on the Turkish side, to which it had attributed the failure of the discussions, to adopt positions that are consistent with the Set of Ideas.

After welcoming the statements by both parties that they would meet again in March 1993, the Council introduced a set of measures designed to promote mutual confidence. The proposals included:

(a) to reduce the number of foreign troops in the Republic of Cyprus alongside a reduction in defence spending;
(b) urging both sides to co-operate with the United Nations Peacekeeping Force in Cyprus (UNFICYP) to extend the unmanning agreement of 1989;
(c) extending the control of the UNFICYP to include Varosha;
(d) to promote people-to-people contact between the two communities by reducing restrictions across the United Nations Buffer Zone;
(e) that restrictions on foreign visitors crossing the Buffer Zone be reduced;
(f) that both sides propose bi-communal projects and commit to the holding of a Cyprus-wide census;
(g) that both sides conduct feasibility studies regarding the resettlement and rehabilitation of persons who would be affected by the territorial adjustments and in connection with a programme of economic development;

It then requested the Secretary-General Boutros Boutros-Ghali to follow up on the implementation of the above measures, including proposals to make the negotiating process more effective and to maintain contact with the Security Council on the matter. At the conclusion of the March 1993 meetings, the resolution required Boutros-Ghali to submit a report on the joint meetings.

== See also ==
- Cyprus dispute
- List of United Nations Security Council Resolutions 701 to 800 (1991–1993)
- United Nations Buffer Zone in Cyprus
- Turkish invasion of Cyprus
