= United Nations Security Council Resolution 791 =

UN Security Council Resolution 791
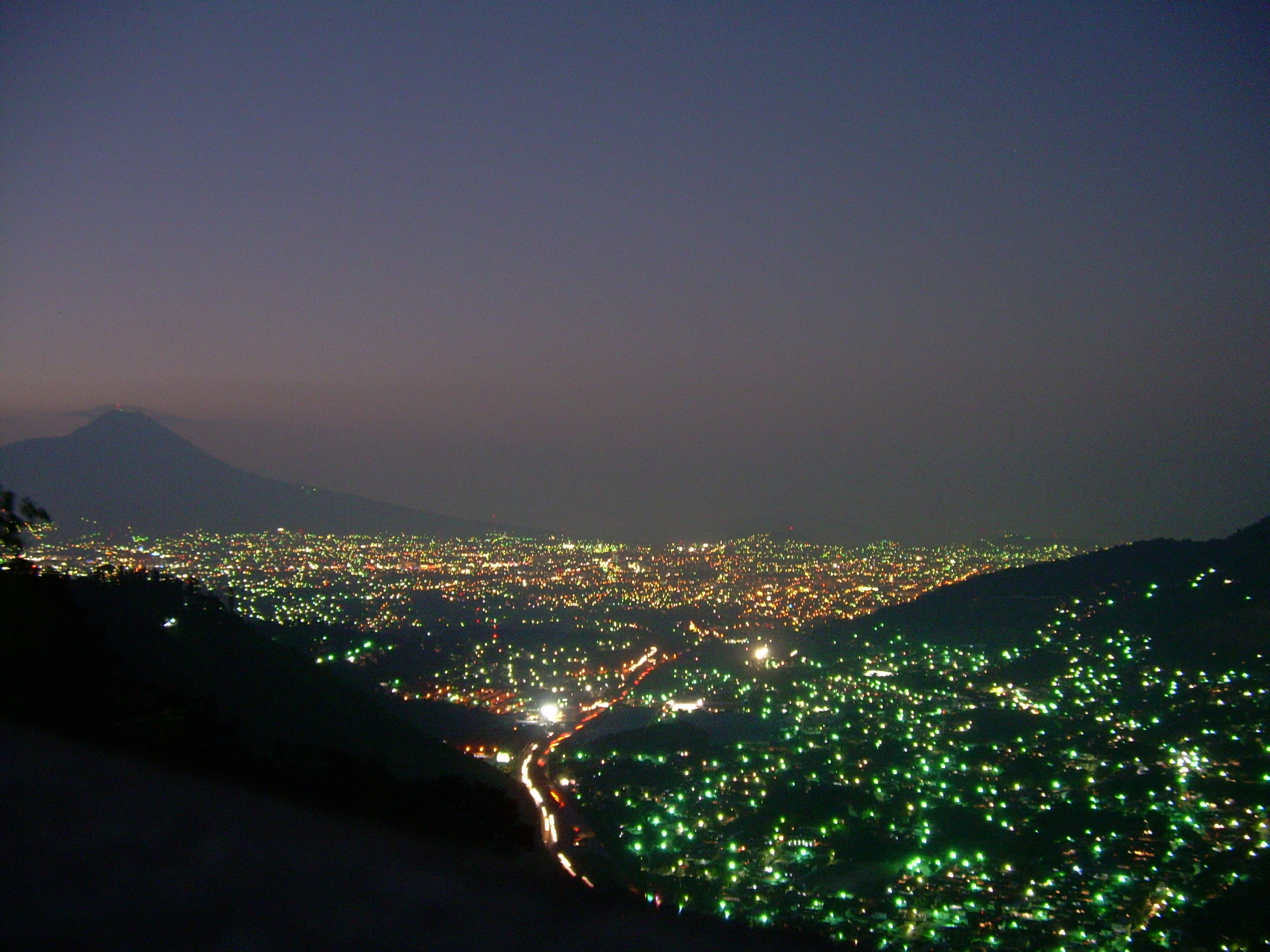
- San Salvador
- Date: 30 November 1992
- Meeting no.: 3,142
- Code: S/RES/791 (Document)
- Subject: El Salvador
- Voting summary: 15 voted for; None voted against; None abstained
- Result: Adopted

Security Council composition
- Permanent members: China; France; Russia; United Kingdom; United States
- Non-permanent members: Austria; Belgium; Cape Verde; Ecuador; Hungary; India; Japan; Morocco; Venezuela; Zimbabwe

United Nations Security Council resolution 791, adopted unanimously on 30 November 1992, after recalling resolutions 637 (1989), 693 (1991), 714 (1991), 729 (1992) and 784 (1992), the Council approved a decision by the Secretary-General Boutros Boutros-Ghali to extend the mandate of the United Nations Observer Mission in El Salvador (ONUSAL) for a further six months until 31 May 1993.

The Council welcomed the intention of the Secretary-General to adapt the future activities and strength of ONUSAL after the recent progress in peace talks, reaffirming the use of his good offices with regard to the peace progress. It also urged both parties, the Farabundo Martí National Liberation Front and Government of El Salvador, to implement and respect the agreements signed by them in Mexico City on 16 January 1992 and exercise utmost restraint.

The resolution also asked for voluntary contributions from Member States and international financial and developmental institutions towards the peace process, and for the Secretary-General to keep the Security Council informed on developments before the current mandate ends.

== See also ==
- List of United Nations Security Council Resolutions 701 to 800 (1991–1993)
- Salvadoran Civil War
- United Nations Observer Group in Central America
