= United Nations Security Council Resolution 795 =

UN Security Council Resolution 795
- Republic of Macedonia
- Date: 11 December 1992
- Meeting no.: 3,147
- Code: S/RES/795 (Document)
- Subject: Macedonia
- Voting summary: 15 voted for; None voted against; None abstained
- Result: Adopted

Security Council composition
- Permanent members: China; France; Russia; United Kingdom; United States
- Non-permanent members: Austria; Belgium; Cape Verde; Ecuador; Hungary; India; Japan; Morocco; Venezuela; Zimbabwe

United Nations Security Council resolution 795, adopted on 11 December 1992, after expressing concern about possible developments which could undermine confidence and stability in the Republic of Macedonia and welcoming the Organization for Security and Co-operation in Europe (OSCE) mission in Macedonia, the Council recalled Chapter VIII of the United Nations Charter and authorised the Secretary-General Boutros Boutros-Ghali to deploy a presence of the United Nations Protection Force (UNPROFOR) in the border areas of Macedonia.

The UNPROFOR "Macedonian Command" would monitor parts of the border areas with Albania and the Federal Republic of Yugoslavia (Serbia and Montenegro); strengthen the country's stability by providing a preventive force; and reporting on developments that may constitute a threat to Macedonia.

The Council requested the Secretary-General to deploy the military, civil affairs, and administrative personnel recommended in his report immediately, upon receiving the consent of the Government of the Republic of Macedonia, urging co-operation with the OSCE mission already there. The military personnel would monitor the border to ensure the conflict in other parts of Yugoslavia did not spill over, while the civilian police contingent would work with local police to maintain order and protect human rights.

== See also ==
- Breakup of Yugoslavia
- Bosnian War
- Croatian War of Independence
- List of United Nations Security Council Resolutions 701 to 800 (1991–1993)
- United Nations Preventive Deployment Force
- Yugoslav Wars
