= United Nations Security Council Resolution 745 =

UN Security Council Resolution 745
- Date: 28 February 1992
- Meeting no.: 3,057
- Code: S/RES/745 (Document)
- Subject: The situation in Cambodia
- Voting summary: 15 voted for; None voted against; None abstained
- Result: Adopted

Security Council composition
- Permanent members: China; France; Russia; United Kingdom; United States
- Non-permanent members: Austria; Belgium; Cape Verde; Ecuador; Hungary; India; Japan; Morocco; Venezuela; Zimbabwe

United Nations Security Council resolution 745, adopted unanimously on 28 February 1992, after recalling resolutions 668 (1990), 717 (1991), 718 (1991) and 728 (1992), the council, after examining a report by the Secretary-General Boutros Boutros-Ghali on 19 February 1992, authorised the establishment of the United Nations Transitional Authority in Cambodia (UNTAC), following on from the political settlement agreed in Paris on 23 October 1991. It was the first occasion where the United Nations had taken over administration of a state, as opposed to monitoring or supervising.

The council further decided that the mandate for UNTAC would last no longer than eighteen months, with the intention of holding elections no later than May 1993. It also requested the Secretary-General deploy the Authority immediately and as efficiently as possible in a cost-effective manner, keeping the operation under continuous review. At the same time, Yasushi Akashi was appointed the Special Representative for Cambodia.

The resolution also called on all parties in Cambodia, including the Supreme National Council of Cambodia, to co-operate with the United Nations Authority, ensuring the implementation of the signed agreements, the safety of all United Nations personnel in the country and providing assistance and facilities to the Authority. It also urged the Cambodian parties to demobilise their military forces before the elections.

Resolution 745 finally called on Member States to provide assistance to the Authority and support the United Nations plan in Cambodia, including programmes for specialised agencies, the rehabilitation and repatriation of displaced persons and repairing infrastructure. It also required the Secretary-General to report back by 1 June 1992 on developments, and subsequently in September 1992, January 1993 and April 1993.

UNTAC's authorised strength was 22,000 personnel, and the cost of the operation was US$1.6 billion. It became operational on 15 March 1992, absorbing the United Nations Advance Mission in Cambodia which existed prior to UNTAC.

== See also ==
- List of United Nations Security Council Resolutions 701 to 800 (1991–1993)
- Modern Cambodia
- Transition of the People's Republic of Kampuchea to Cambodia
