= United Nations Security Council Resolution 755 =

UN Security Council Resolution 755
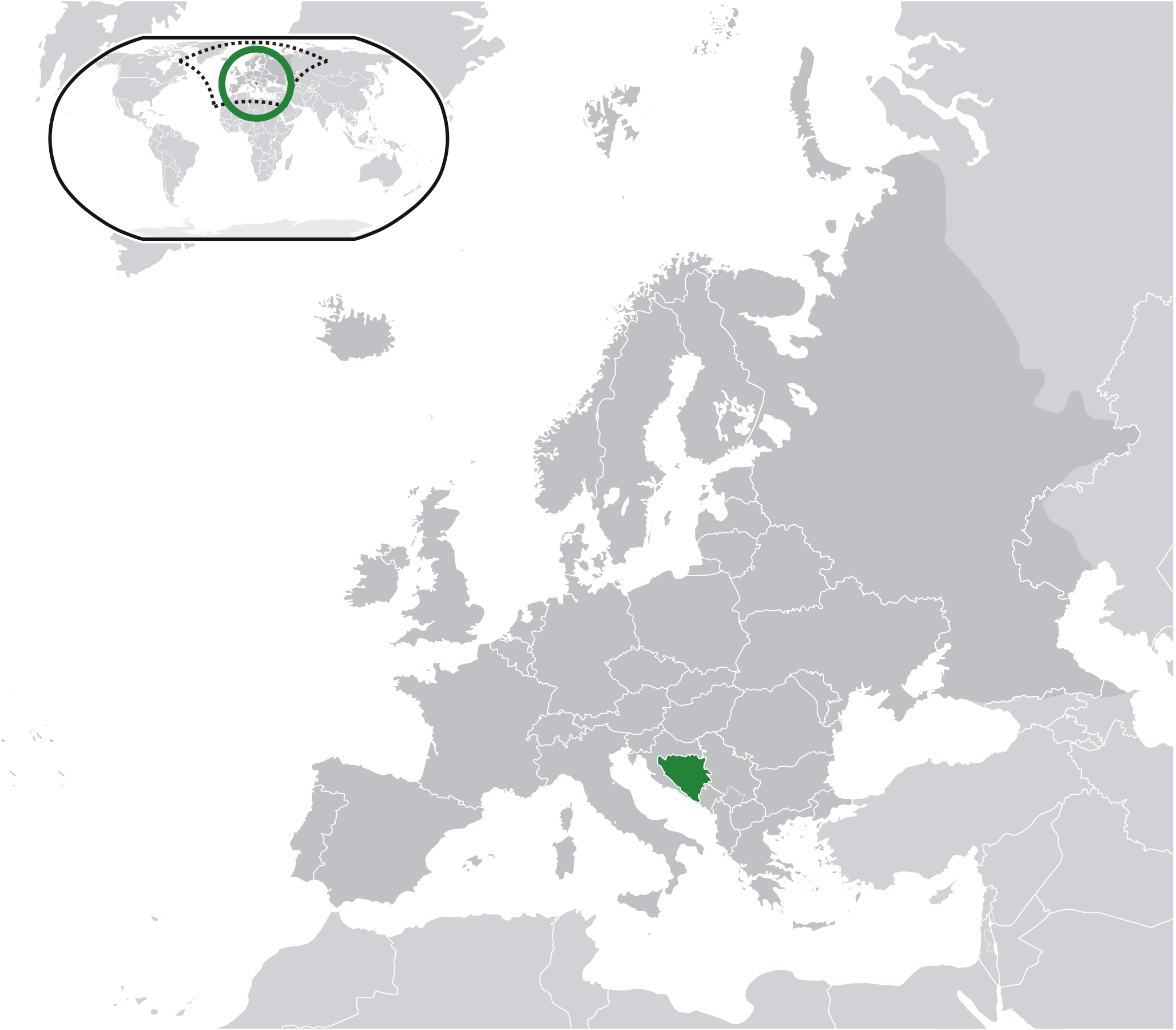
- Location of Bosnia and Herzegovina
- Date: 20 May 1992
- Meeting no.: 3,079
- Code: S/RES/755 (Document)
- Subject: Admission of new Members to the UN: Bosnia and Herzegovina
- Result: Adopted

Security Council composition
- Permanent members: China; France; Russia; United Kingdom; United States
- Non-permanent members: Austria; Belgium; Cape Verde; Ecuador; Hungary; India; Japan; Morocco; Venezuela; Zimbabwe

United Nations Security Council resolution 755, adopted without a vote on 20 May 1992, after examining the application of the Republic of Bosnia and Herzegovina for membership in the United Nations, the Council recommended to the General Assembly that Bosnia and Herzegovina be admitted. The recommendation came amid the breakup of Yugoslavia.

== See also ==
- Member states of the United Nations
- List of United Nations Security Council Resolutions 701 to 800 (1991–1993)
- List of United Nations Security Council Resolutions related to the conflicts in former Yugoslavia
