= United Nations Security Council Resolution 738 =

UN Security Council Resolution 738
- Location of Tajikistan
- Date: 29 January 1992
- Meeting no.: 3,044
- Code: S/RES/738 (Document)
- Subject: Admission of new Members to the UN: Tajikistan
- Result: Adopted

Security Council composition
- Permanent members: China; France; Russia; United Kingdom; United States
- Non-permanent members: Austria; Belgium; Cape Verde; Ecuador; Hungary; India; Japan; Morocco; Venezuela; Zimbabwe

United Nations Security Council resolution 738, adopted without a vote on 29 January 1992, after examining the application of the Republic of Tajikistan for membership in the United Nations, the Council recommended to the General Assembly that Tajikistan be admitted.

== See also ==
- Member states of the United Nations
- List of United Nations Security Council Resolutions 701 to 800 (1991–1993)
