= United Nations Security Council Resolution 704 =

UN Security Council Resolution 704
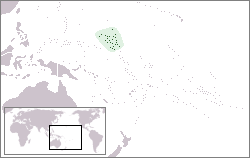
- Location of the Marshall Islands
- Date: 9 August 1991
- Meeting no.: 3,003
- Code: S/RES/704 (Document)
- Subject: Admission of new Members to the UN: Marshall Islands
- Result: Adopted

Security Council composition
- Permanent members: China; France; Soviet Union; United Kingdom; United States
- Non-permanent members: Austria; Belgium; Côte d'Ivoire; Cuba; Ecuador; India; Romania; Yemen; Zaire; Zimbabwe

United Nations Security Council resolution 704, adopted without a vote on 9 August 1991, after examining the application of the Marshall Islands for membership in the United Nations, the Council recommended to the General Assembly that the Marshall Islands be admitted.

On 17 September 1991, the General Assembly admitted the Republic of the Marshall Islands under Resolution 46/3.

== See also ==
- List of United Nations member states
- List of United Nations Security Council Resolutions 701 to 800 (1991–1993)
