= United Nations Security Council Resolution 759 =

UN Security Council Resolution 759
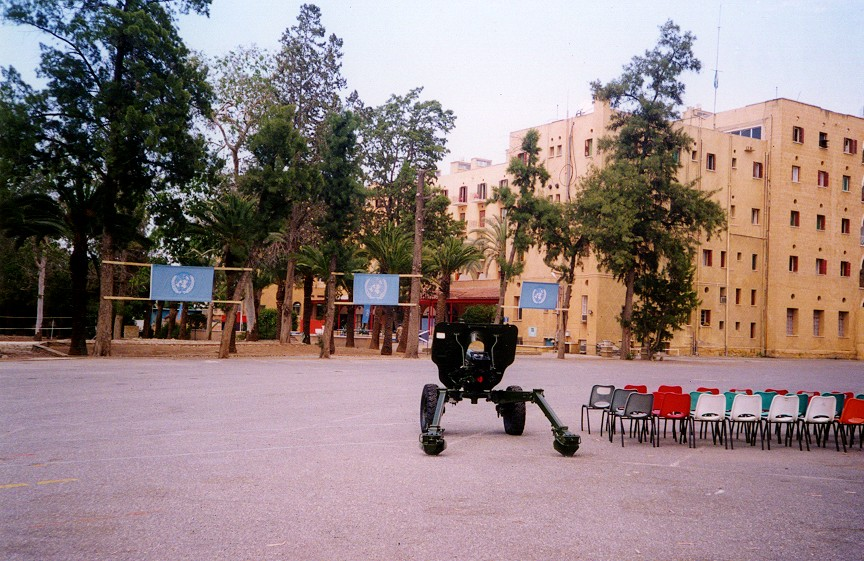
- UNFICYP camp
- Date: 12 June 1992
- Meeting no.: 3,084
- Code: S/RES/759 (Document)
- Subject: Cyprus
- Voting summary: 15 voted for; None voted against; None abstained
- Result: Adopted

Security Council composition
- Permanent members: China; France; Russia; United Kingdom; United States
- Non-permanent members: Austria; Belgium; Cape Verde; Ecuador; Hungary; India; Japan; Morocco; Venezuela; Zimbabwe

United Nations Security Council resolution 759, adopted unanimously on 12 June 1992, noted a report of the Secretary-General that, due to the existing circumstances, the presence of the United Nations Peacekeeping Force in Cyprus (UNFICYP) would continue to be essential for a peaceful settlement. The Council asked the Secretary-General to report back again before 30 November 1992, to follow the implementation of the resolution.

The Council reaffirmed its previous resolutions, including Resolution 365 (1974), expressed its concern over the situation, urged the involved parties to work together toward peace and once more extended the stationing of the Force in Cyprus, established in Resolution 186 (1964), until 15 December 1992.

== See also ==
- Cyprus dispute
- List of United Nations Security Council Resolutions 701 to 800 (1991–1993)
- United Nations Buffer Zone in Cyprus
- Turkish invasion of Cyprus
