= United Nations Security Council Resolution 750 =

UN Security Council Resolution 750
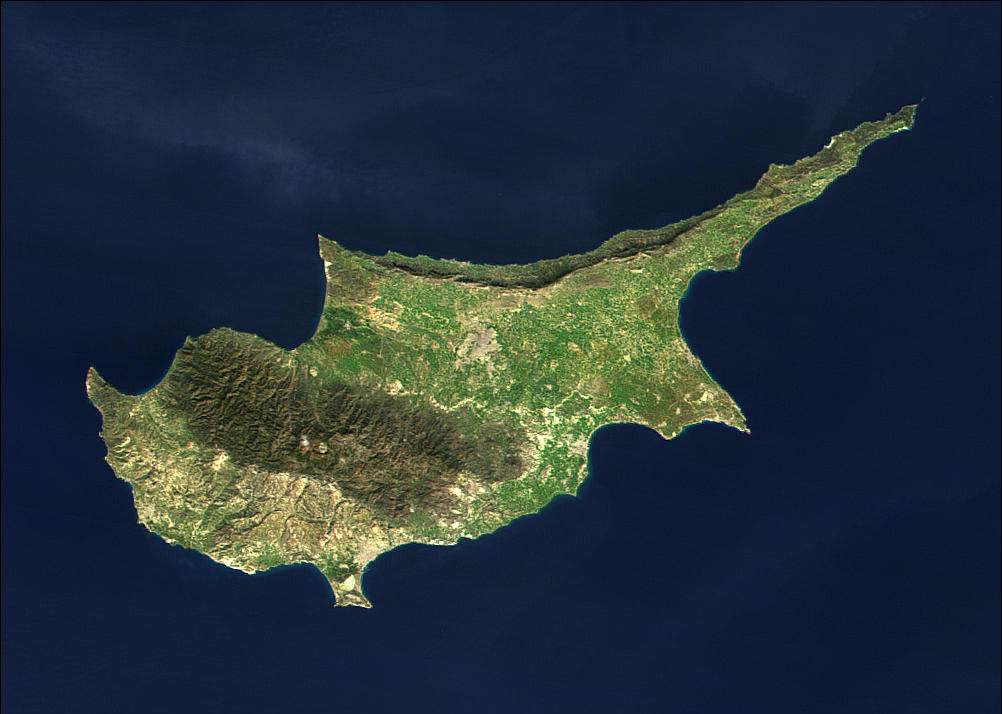
- Island of Cyprus
- Date: 10 April 1992
- Meeting no.: 3,067
- Code: S/RES/750 (Document)
- Subject: Cyprus
- Voting summary: 15 voted for; None voted against; None abstained
- Result: Adopted

Security Council composition
- Permanent members: China; France; Russia; United Kingdom; United States
- Non-permanent members: Austria; Belgium; Cape Verde; Ecuador; Hungary; India; Japan; Morocco; Venezuela; Zimbabwe

United Nations Security Council resolution 750, adopted unanimously on 10 April 1992, after reaffirming previous resolutions on the situation in Cyprus, the Council declared that the Cyprus dispute must be settled on the basis of a single Cyprus with a single sovereignty and citizenship, a bi-communal and bi-zonal federation, as set out in resolutions 649 (1990) and 716 (1991).

The Council called on representatives from the Republic of Cyprus and Northern Cyprus to adhere to these principles, which must not include secession or union with another country. The resolution again endorsed the "Set of Ideas", subject to further negotiations on unresolved issues, and urged co-operation with the Secretary-General Boutros Boutros-Ghali.

Resolution 750 also highlighted the need for a high-level conference with the leaders of the two communities on Cyprus, in addition to those of Greece and Turkey to conclude an overall framework agreement.

== See also ==
- Cyprus dispute
- List of United Nations Security Council Resolutions 701 to 800 (1991–1993)
- United Nations Buffer Zone in Cyprus
- Turkish Invasion of Cyprus
