= United Nations Security Council Resolution 737 =

UN Security Council Resolution 737
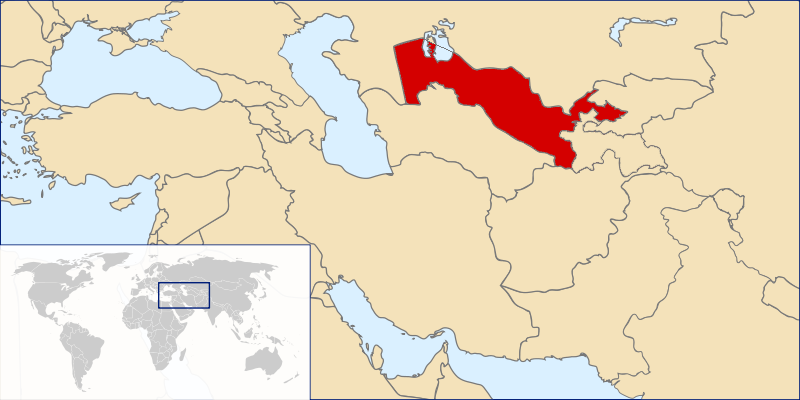
- Location of Uzbekistan
- Date: 29 January 1992
- Meeting no.: 3,043
- Code: S/RES/737 (Document)
- Subject: Admission of new Members to the UN: Uzbekistan
- Result: Adopted

Security Council composition
- Permanent members: China; France; Russia; United Kingdom; United States
- Non-permanent members: Austria; Belgium; Cape Verde; Ecuador; Hungary; India; Japan; Morocco; Venezuela; Zimbabwe

United Nations Security Council resolution 737, adopted without a vote on 29 January 1992, recommended to the General Assembly that the Republic of Uzbekistan be admitted as a member. This recommendation followed an examination of Uzbekistan's application for membership in the United Nations.

== See also ==
- Member states of the United Nations
- List of United Nations Security Council Resolutions 701 to 800 (1991–1993)
