= United Nations Security Council Resolution 780 =

UN Security Council Resolution 780
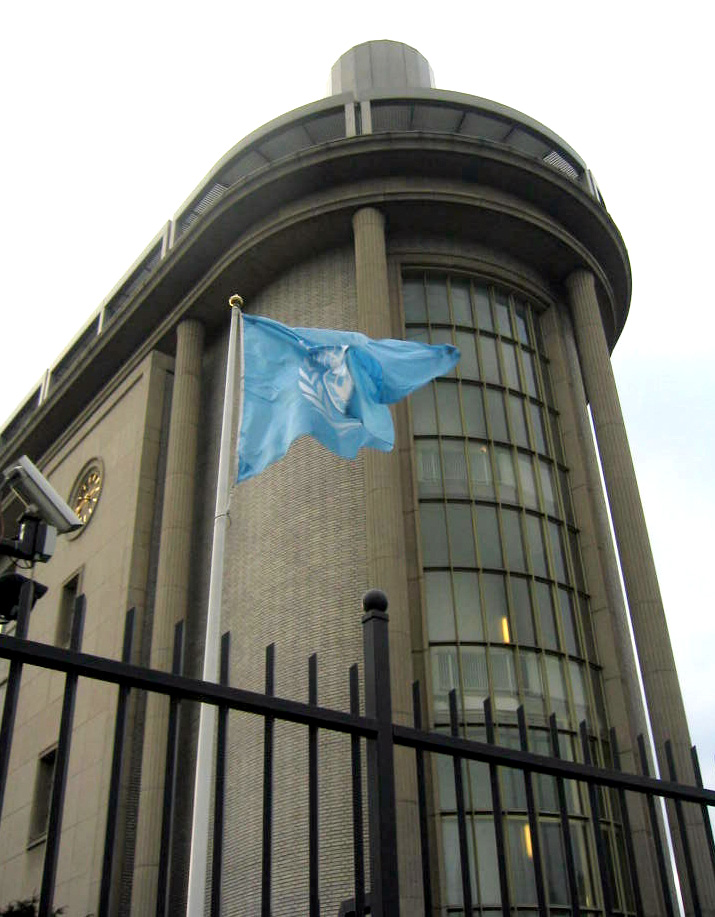
- International Criminal Tribunal for the former Yugoslavia
- Date: 6 October 1992
- Meeting no.: 3,119
- Code: S/RES/780 (Document)
- Subject: Former Yugoslavia
- Voting summary: 15 voted for; None voted against; None abstained
- Result: Adopted

Security Council composition
- Permanent members: China; France; Russia; United Kingdom; United States
- Non-permanent members: Austria; Belgium; Cape Verde; Ecuador; Hungary; India; Japan; Morocco; Venezuela; Zimbabwe

United Nations Security Council resolution 780 was adopted unanimously on 6 October 1992. After reaffirming Resolution 713 (1991) and subsequent resolutions on the topic, the Council expressed its concern at the continued "widespread violations of international humanitarian law" in Bosnia and Herzegovina and authorised the Secretary-General Boutros Boutros-Ghali to establish a Commission of Experts to examine and analyse the information submitted pursuant to Resolution 771 (1992) on violations of the Geneva Conventions in the region.

The resolution urged Member States and international organisations to collect information relating to violations of international law in Bosnia and to make it available within 30 days of the adoption of the present resolution. Information collected would be analysed by the Commission of Experts. The Commission consisted of five members from Canada, Egypt, the Netherlands, Norway and Senegal, which submitted its first interim report in February 1993, concluding it would be for the Security Council or other component of the United Nations to create a tribunal relating to the events in Bosnia-Herzegovina, and the former Yugoslavia generally. The then French Foreign Minister Roland Dumas congratulated the passage of the resolution, who said it was a "considerable step in the evolution of international law" and was unprecedented since the founding of the United Nations.

The conclusions of the Commission of Experts were delivered to the President of the United Nations Security Council along with a letter from the Secretary-General on 24 May 1994.

== See also ==
- Bosnian Genocide
- Bosnian War
- List of United Nations Security Council Resolutions 701 to 800 (1991–1993)
- Yugoslav Wars
- List of United Nations Security Council Resolutions related to the conflicts in former Yugoslavia
