= United Nations Security Council Resolution 798 =

UN Security Council Resolution 798
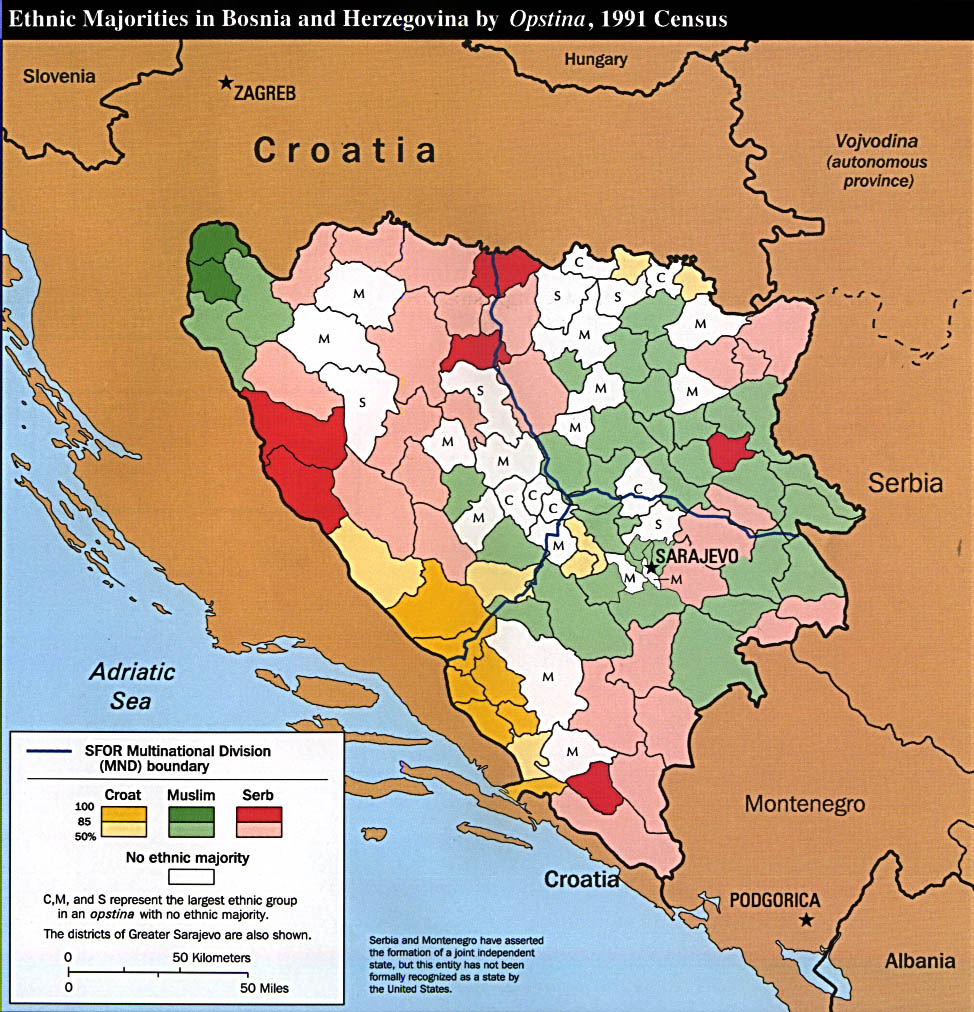
- 1991 census results in Bosnia and Herzegovina
- Date: 18 December 1992
- Meeting no.: 3,150
- Code: S/RES/798 (Document)
- Subject: Bosnia and Herzegovina
- Voting summary: 15 voted for; None voted against; None abstained
- Result: Adopted

Security Council composition
- Permanent members: China; France; Russia; United Kingdom; United States
- Non-permanent members: Austria; Belgium; Cape Verde; Ecuador; Hungary; India; Japan; Morocco; Venezuela; Zimbabwe

United Nations Security Council resolution 798, adopted unanimously on 18 December 1992, after reaffirming 770 (1992) and 771 (1992) and supporting an initiative by the European Council.The Council condemned reports of the massive, organized and systematic detention and rape of women, in particular Muslim women, in Bosnia and Herzegovina during the Bosnian War.

The Council further demanded all detention camps be closed, requesting the Secretary-General to provide support to enable the European Community delegations to have free and secure access to the places of detention, further requesting a report within 15 days of the passing of the current resolution.

Resolution 798 was the first time the United Nations had condemned the rape of women in wartime.

== See also ==
- Breakup of Yugoslavia
- Bosnian Genocide
- Bosnian War
- Croatian War of Independence
- List of United Nations Security Council Resolutions 701 to 800 (1991–1993)
- Yugoslav Wars
