= United Nations Security Council Resolution 703 =

United Nations Security Council resolution

UN Security Council Resolution 703
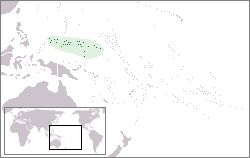
- Location of Micronesia
- Date: 9 August 1991
- Meeting no.: 3,002
- Code: S/RES/703 (Document)
- Subject: Admission of new Members to the UN: Micronesia
- Result: Adopted

Security Council composition
- Permanent members: China; France; Soviet Union; United Kingdom; United States
- Non-permanent members: Austria; Belgium; Côte d'Ivoire; Cuba; Ecuador; India; Romania; Yemen; Zaire; Zimbabwe

United Nations Security Council resolution 703, adopted without a vote on 9 August 1991, after examining the application of the Federated States of Micronesia for membership in the United Nations, the Council recommended to the General Assembly that Micronesia be admitted.

On 17 September 1991, the General Assembly admitted the Federated States of Micronesia under Resolution 46/2.

== See also ==
- List of United Nations member states
- List of United Nations Security Council Resolutions 701 to 800 (1991–1993)
