= United Nations Security Council Resolution 774 =

UN Security Council Resolution 774
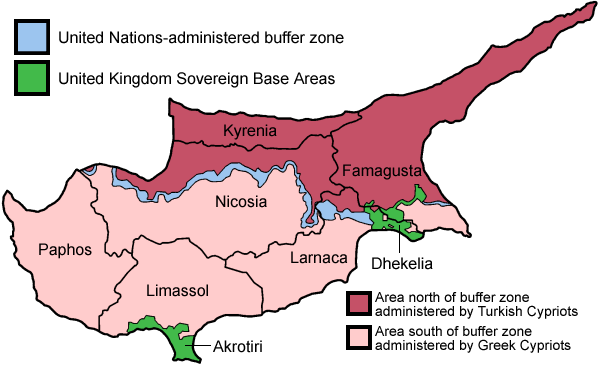
- Divided Cyprus
- Date: 26 August 1992
- Meeting no.: 3,109
- Code: S/RES/774 (Document)
- Subject: Cyprus
- Voting summary: 15 voted for; None voted against; None abstained
- Result: Adopted

Security Council composition
- Permanent members: China; France; Russia; United Kingdom; United States
- Non-permanent members: Austria; Belgium; Cape Verde; Ecuador; Hungary; India; Japan; Morocco; Venezuela; Zimbabwe

United Nations Security Council resolution 774, adopted unanimously on 26 August 1992, after reaffirming all previous resolutions on Cyprus, the Council noted that while some progress had been made in negotiations between the two communities on Cyprus, there had still been some difficulties in fully implementing Resolution 750 (1992).

The Council reaffirmed that the Cyprus dispute must be settled on the basis of a single State of Cyprus with a single sovereignty and citizenship, a bi-communal and bi-zonal federation, which would exclude union in part of whole with any other country, or secession. It endorsed the "Set of Ideas" and territorial adjustments as a basis for a framework agreement, though agreed with the Secretary-General that the idea had yet to be fully developed.

The resolution urged the Republic of Cyprus and Northern Cyprus to continue talks at the United Nations Headquarters when they meet face-to-face with the Secretary-General Boutros Boutros-Ghali on 26 October 1992. Following a satisfactory conclusion to the talks, the Council reaffirmed its position that a high level conference with the leaders of the two communities and with the leaders of Greece and Turkey should take place to conclude an overall agreement, expressing the expectation that an agreement would be concluded in 1992 and implemented in 1993.

Resolution 774 also stated that the current status quo was unacceptable and that if future negotiations should fail, called on the Secretary-General to identify reasons for the failure and to recommend to the Council further causes of action to resolve the dispute. The resolution also confirmed the continuance of the Treaty of Guarantee signed in 1960.

== See also ==
- Cyprus dispute
- List of United Nations Security Council Resolutions 701 to 800 (1991–1993)
- United Nations Buffer Zone in Cyprus
- Turkish invasion of Cyprus
