= United Nations Security Council Resolution 800 =

UN Security Council Resolution 800
- Location of Slovakia
- Date: 8 January 1993
- Meeting no.: 3,157
- Code: S/RES/800 (Document)
- Subject: Admission of new Members to the UN: Slovakia
- Result: Adopted

Security Council composition
- Permanent members: China; France; Russia; United Kingdom; United States
- Non-permanent members: Brazil; Cape Verde; Djibouti; Hungary; Japan; Morocco; New Zealand; Pakistan; Spain; Venezuela

United Nations Security Council resolution 800, adopted without a vote on 8 January 1993, after examining the application of the Slovak Republic for membership in the United Nations, the Council recommended to the General Assembly that Slovakia be admitted.

== See also ==
- Member states of the United Nations
- List of United Nations Security Council Resolutions 701 to 800 (1991–1993)
