= United Nations Security Council Resolution 720 =

UN Security Council Resolution 720
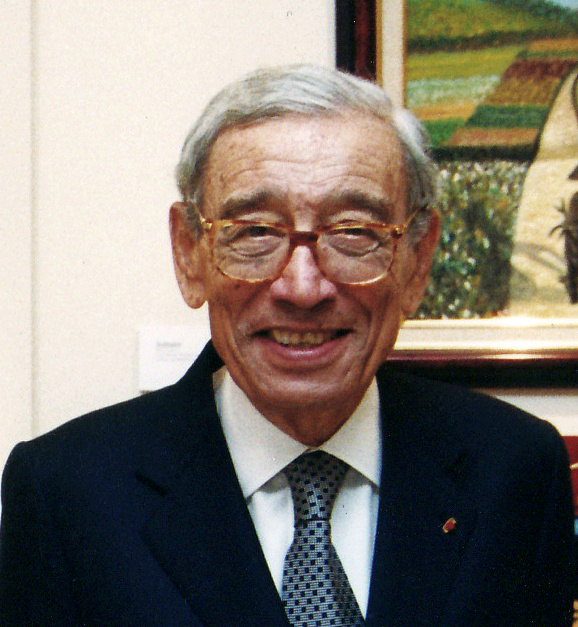
- Boutros-Boutros Ghali
- Date: 21 November 1991
- Meeting no.: 3,017
- Code: S/RES/720 (Document)
- Subject: Recommendation regarding the appointment of the Secretary-General
- Voting summary: 15 voted for; None voted against; None abstained
- Result: Adopted

Security Council composition
- Permanent members: China; France; Soviet Union; United Kingdom; United States
- Non-permanent members: Austria; Belgium; Côte d'Ivoire; Cuba; Ecuador; India; Romania; Yemen; Zaire; Zimbabwe

United Nations Security Council resolution 720, adopted unanimously at a closed meeting on 21 November 1991, having considered the question of the recommendation for the appointment of the Secretary-General of the United Nations, the Council recommended to the General Assembly that Mr. Boutros Boutros-Ghali be appointed for a term of office from 1 January 1992, to 31 December 1996.

On 3 December 1991, the General Assembly endorsed the Security Council's decision, and appointed Boutros-Ghali under Resolution 46/21.

== See also ==
- List of United Nations Security Council Resolutions 701 to 800 (1991–1993)
