= United Nations Security Council Resolution 760 =

UN Security Council Resolution 760
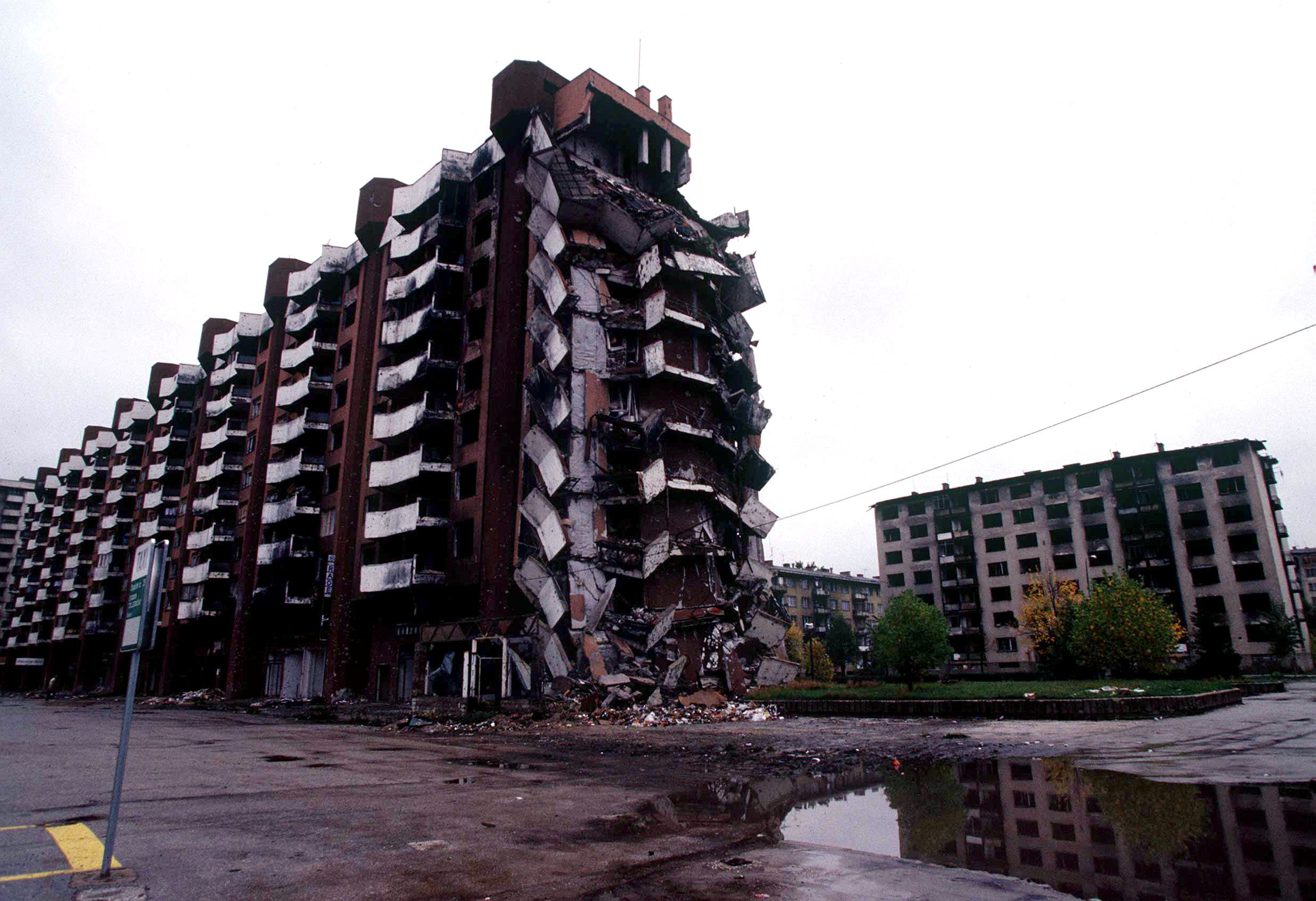
- Destroyed apartment building in Sarajevo
- Date: 18 June 1992
- Meeting no.: 3,086
- Code: S/RES/760 (Document)
- Subject: Federal Republic of Yugoslavia
- Voting summary: 15 voted for; None voted against; None abstained
- Result: Adopted

Security Council composition
- Permanent members: China; France; Russia; United Kingdom; United States
- Non-permanent members: Austria; Belgium; Cape Verde; Ecuador; Hungary; India; Japan; Morocco; Venezuela; Zimbabwe

United Nations Security Council resolution 760, adopted unanimously on 18 June 1992, after reaffirming resolutions 752 (1992), 757 (1992) and 758 (1992) which brought attention to the need for humanitarian aid in the former Yugoslavia, the council, acting under Chapter VII of the United Nations Charter, exempted humanitarian goods such as food and medical aid from the prohibitions under Resolution 757.

== See also ==
- Breakup of Yugoslavia
- Bosnian War
- Croatian War of Independence
- List of United Nations Security Council Resolutions 701 to 800 (1991–1993)
- Ten-Day War
- Yugoslav Wars
- List of United Nations Security Council Resolutions related to the conflicts in former Yugoslavia
