= United Nations Security Council Resolution 734 =

UN Security Council Resolution 734
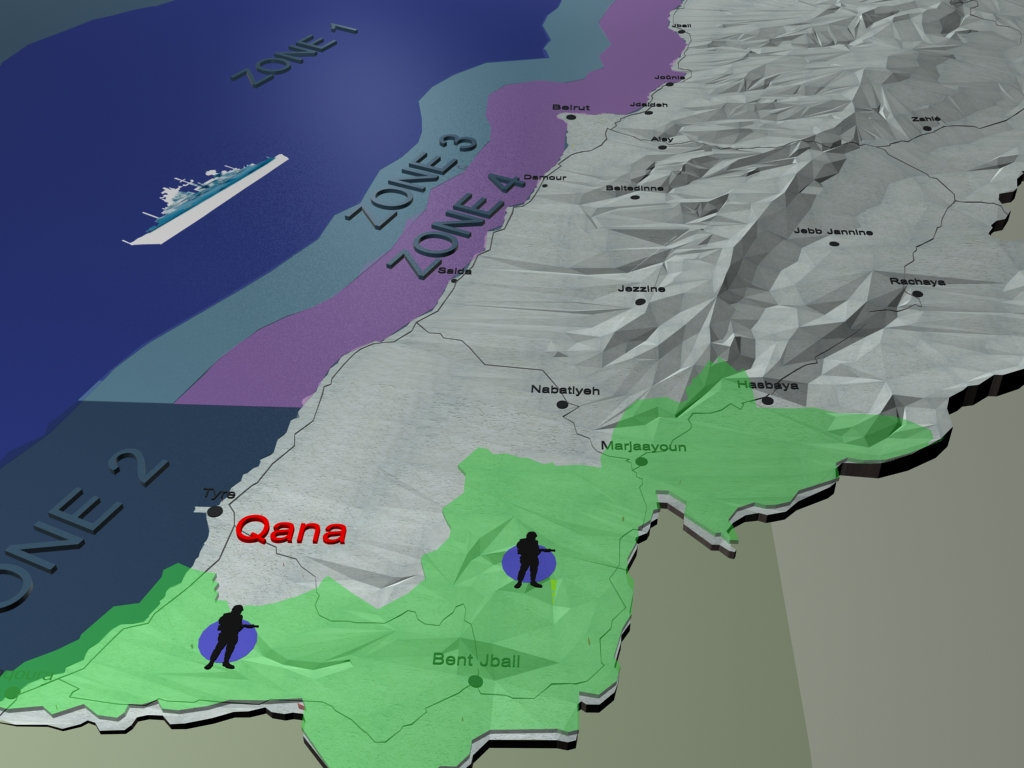
- UNIFIL area of operations
- Date: 29 January 1992
- Meeting no.: 3,040
- Code: S/RES/734 (Document)
- Subject: Israel–Lebanon
- Voting summary: 15 voted for; None voted against; None abstained
- Result: Adopted

Security Council composition
- Permanent members: China; France; Russia; United Kingdom; United States
- Non-permanent members: Austria; Belgium; Cape Verde; Ecuador; Hungary; India; Japan; Morocco; Venezuela; Zimbabwe

United Nations Security Council resolution 734, adopted unanimously on 29 January 1992, after recalling previous resolutions on the topic, as well as studying the report by the Secretary-General on the United Nations Interim Force in Lebanon (UNIFIL) approved in 426 (1978), the Council decided to extend the mandate of UNIFIL for a further six months until 31 July 1992.

The Council then reemphasised the mandate of the Force and requested the Secretary-General to report back on the progress made with regard to the implementation of resolutions 425 (1978) and 426 (1978). It also required him to examine ways of improving the effectiveness of the Force.

== See also ==
- Israeli–Lebanese conflict
- Lebanese Civil War
- List of United Nations Security Council Resolutions 701 to 800 (1991–1993)
- South Lebanon conflict (1985–2000)
