= List of United Nations Security Council Resolutions 701 to 800 =

This is a list of United Nations Security Council Resolutions 701 to 800 adopted between 31 July 1991 and 8 January 1993.

Resolution	Date	Vote	Concerns
701	31 July 1991	15–0–0	Extends mandate of the United Nations Interim Force in Lebanon
702	8 August 1991	Adopted without vote	Admission of North Korea and South Korea to the United Nations
703	9 August 1991	Adopted without vote	Admission of the Federated States of Micronesia to the United Nations
704	9 August 1991	Adopted without vote	Admission of the Marshall Islands to the United Nations
705	15 August 1991	15–0–0	Iraqi payments into the United Nations Compensation Commission
706	15 August 1991	13–1–1 (against: Cuba; abstention: Yemen)	Mechanism for Iraq to sell oil in return for humanitarian aid
707	15 August 1991	15–0–0	Condemns non-compliance of Iraq and violations of Resolution 687
708	28 August 1991	15–0–0	Vacancy at the International Court of Justice
709	12 September 1991	Adopted without vote	Admission of Estonia to the United Nations
710	12 September 1991	Adopted without vote	Admission of Latvia to the United Nations
711	12 September 1991	Adopted without vote	Admission of Lithuania to the United Nations
712	19 September 1991	13–1–1 (against: Cuba; abstention: Yemen)	Humanitarian situation in Iraq; United Nations Compensation Commission
713	25 September 1991	15–0–0	European Community efforts, arms embargo in the SFR Yugoslavia during the Yugoslav Wars
714	30 September 1991	15–0–0	Peace progress in El Salvador during the Salvadoran Civil War
715	11 October 1991	15–0–0	Measures by the United Nations Special Commission to inspect weapons in Iraq
716	11 October 1991	15–0–0	Negotiations regarding the Cyprus dispute
717	16 October 1991	15–0–0	Establishes the United Nations Advance Mission in Cambodia
718	31 October 1991	15–0–0	Political settlement of the Cambodia conflict
719	6 November 1991	15–0–0	Extends mandate of the United Nations Observer Group in Central America
720	21 November 1991	15–0–0	Recommends appointment of Boutros Boutros-Ghali as Secretary-General
721	27 November 1991	15–0–0	Secretary-General's efforts in Socialist Federal Republic of Yugoslavia during the Yugoslav Wars
722	29 November 1991	15–0–0	Extends mandate of the United Nations Disengagement Observer Force
723	12 December 1991	15–0–0	Extends mandate of the United Nations Peacekeeping Force in Cyprus
724	15 December 1991	15–0–0	Establishes Security Council Committee concerning Yugoslav Wars
725	31 December 1991	15–0–0	Settlement Plan for referendum in Western Sahara
726	6 January 1992	15–0–0	Deportations of Palestinians by Israel in the occupied territories
727	8 January 1992	15–0–0	European Community Monitoring Mission in the former Yugoslavia
728	8 January 1992	15–0–0	Demining, peace process in Cambodia
729	14 January 1992	15–0–0	Enlarges the United Nations Observer Mission in El Salvador
730	16 January 1992	15–0–0	Terminates the United Nations Observer Group in Central America
731	21 January 1992	15–0–0	Condemns Libya over destruction of Pan Am Flight 103 over Lockerbie and UTA Flight 772 over Niger
732	23 January 1992	Adopted without vote	Admission of Kazakhstan to the United Nations
733	23 January 1992	15–0–0	Imposes arms embargo on Somalia due to the Somali Civil War
734	29 January 1992	15–0–0	Extends mandate of the United Nations Interim Force in Lebanon
735	29 January 1992	Adopted without vote	Admission of Armenia to the United Nations
736	29 January 1992	Adopted without vote	Admission of Kyrgyzstan to the United Nations
737	29 January 1992	Adopted without vote	Admission of Uzbekistan to the United Nations
738	29 January 1992	Adopted without vote	Admission of Tajikistan to the United Nations
739	5 February 1992	Adopted without vote	Admission of the Republic of Moldova to the United Nations
740	7 February 1992	15–0–0	Peacekeeping plan for the SFR Yugoslavia during Yugoslav Wars
741	7 February 1992	Adopted without vote	Admission of Turkmenistan to the United Nations
742	14 February 1992	Adopted without vote	Admission of Azerbaijan to the United Nations
743	21 February 1992	15–0–0	Establishes the United Nations Protection Force in Yugoslavia
744	25 February 1992	Adopted without vote	Admission of San Marino to the United Nations
745	28 February 1992	15–0–0	Establishes the United Nations Transitional Authority in Cambodia
746	17 March 1992	15–0–0 (present not voting: Italy, Kenya, Nigeria, Somalia)	Urges parties involved in the Somali Civil War co-operate with the United Nations
747	24 March 1992	15–0–0	Enlarges mandate of the United Nations Angola Verification Mission II
748	31 March 1992	10–0–5 (abstentions: Cape Verde, China, India, Morocco, Zimbabwe)	Imposes civil aviation, arms embargoes on Libya
749	7 April 1992	15–0–0	The United Nations Protection Force
750	10 April 1992	15–0–0	Negotiations in the Cyprus dispute
751	24 April 1992	15–0–0	Establishes the United Nations Operation in Somalia I; arms embargo against Somalia
752	15 May 1992	15–0–0	The Bosnian War
753	18 May 1992	Adopted without vote	Admission of Croatia to the United Nations
754	18 May 1992	Adopted without vote	Admission of Slovenia to the United Nations
755	20 May 1992	Adopted without vote	Admission of Bosnia and Herzegovina to the United Nations
756	29 May 1992	15–0–0	Extends mandate of the United Nations Disengagement Observer Force
757	30 May 1992	13–0–2 (abstentions: China, Zimbabwe)	Imposes economic sanctions, embargo on the Federal Republic of Yugoslavia
758	8 June 1992	15–0–0	Enlarges United Nations Protection Force; violations of ceasefire in Bosnia
759	12 June 1992	15–0–0	Extends mandate of the United Nations Peacekeeping Force in Cyprus
760	18 June 1992	15–0–0	Sanctions on the Federal Republic of Yugoslavia
761	29 June 1992	15–0–0	Calls for additional deployments of the United Nations Protection Force
762	30 June 1992	15–0–0	Establishes Joint Commission, strengthens United Nations Protection Force
763	6 July 1992	Adopted without vote	Admission of Georgia to the United Nations
764	13 July 1992	15–0–0	Continuing fighting in Bosnia and Herzegovina
765	16 July 1992	15–0–0	Boipatong massacre in South Africa
766	21 July 1992	15–0–0	Difficulties implementing political agreements in Cambodia
767	27 July 1992	15–0–0	Urges co-operation by parties with the United Nations Operation in Somalia I
768	30 July 1992	15–0–0	Extends mandate of the United Nations Interim Force in Lebanon
769	7 August 1992	15–0–0	Enlarges, strengthens the United Nations Protection Force
770	13 August 1992	12–0–3 (abstentions: China, India, Zimbabwe)	Humanitarian assistance in Bosnia and Herzegovina
771	13 August 1992	15–0–0	Condemns "ethnic cleansing", other violations in Bosnia and Yugoslavia
772	17 August 1992	15–0–0	Authorises deployment United Nations Observers to South Africa
773	26 August 1992	14–0–1 (abstention: Ecuador)	Endorses decisions taken by the Iraq-Kuwait Boundary Demarcation Commission
774	26 August 1992	15–0–0	Negotiations concerning the Cyprus dispute
775	28 August 1992	15–0–0	Authorises increase in strength of the United Nations Operation in Somalia I
776	14 September 1992	12–0–3 (abstentions: China, India, Zimbabwe)	Enlarges United Nations Protection Force in Bosnia and Herzegovina
777	19 September 1992	12–0–3 (abstentions: China, India, Zimbabwe)	Declares the Socialist Federal Republic of Yugoslavia ceased to exist
778	2 October 1992	14–0–1 (abstention: China)	Transfer of funds from Iraqi oil sales to escrow account in Resolution 706
779	6 October 1992	15–0–0	Authorises United Nations Protection Force monitoring of Yugoslav Army withdrawal from Croatia
780	6 October 1992	15–0–0	Establishes Commission of Experts to analyse information pursuant to Resolution 771
781	9 October 1992	14–0–1 (abstention: China)	Ban on military flights over Bosnia and Herzegovina
782	13 October 1992	15–0–0	Rome General Peace Accords agreement during Mozambican Civil War
783	13 October 1992	15–0–0	Demands full deployment of United Nations Transitional Authority in Cambodia
784	30 October 1992	15–0–0	Extends mandate of the United Nations Observer Mission in El Salvador
785	30 October 1992	15–0–0	Extends mandate of the United Nations Angola Verification Mission II
786	10 November 1992	15–0–0	Increases size of the United Nations Protection Force in Bosnia and Herzegovina
787	16 November 1992	13–0–2 (abstentions: China, Zimbabwe)	Further sanctions against the Federal Republic of Yugoslavia
788	19 November 1992	15–0–0	Imposes arms embargo on Liberia during First Liberian Civil War
789	25 November 1992	15–0–0	Negotiations for a settlement in the Cyprus dispute
790	25 November 1992	15–0–0	Extends mandate of the United Nations Disengagement Observer Force
791	30 November 1992	15–0–0	Extends mandate of the United Nations Observer Mission in El Salvador
792	30 November 1992	14–0–1 (abstention: China)	United Nations Transitional Authority in Cambodia's preparation for 1993 elections
793	30 November 1992	15–0–0	Extends mandate of the United Nations Angola Verification Mission II
794	3 December 1992	15–0–0	Creation of the Unified Task Force in Somalia
795	11 December 1992	15–0–0	Deployment of United Nations Protection Force on Macedonian border
796	14 December 1992	15–0–0	Extends mandate of the United Nations Peacekeeping Force in Cyprus
797	16 December 1992	15–0–0	Establishes the United Nations Operation in Mozambique
798	18 December 1992	15–0–0	Condemns rape of women in Bosnia and Herzegovina
799	18 December 1992	15–0–0	Deportation of Palestinians by Israel
800	8 January 1993	Adopted without vote	Admission of Slovak Republic to the United Nations

== See also ==
- Lists of United Nations Security Council resolutions
- List of United Nations Security Council Resolutions 601 to 700
- List of United Nations Security Council Resolutions 801 to 900
