= United Nations Security Council Resolution 723 =

UN Security Council Resolution 723
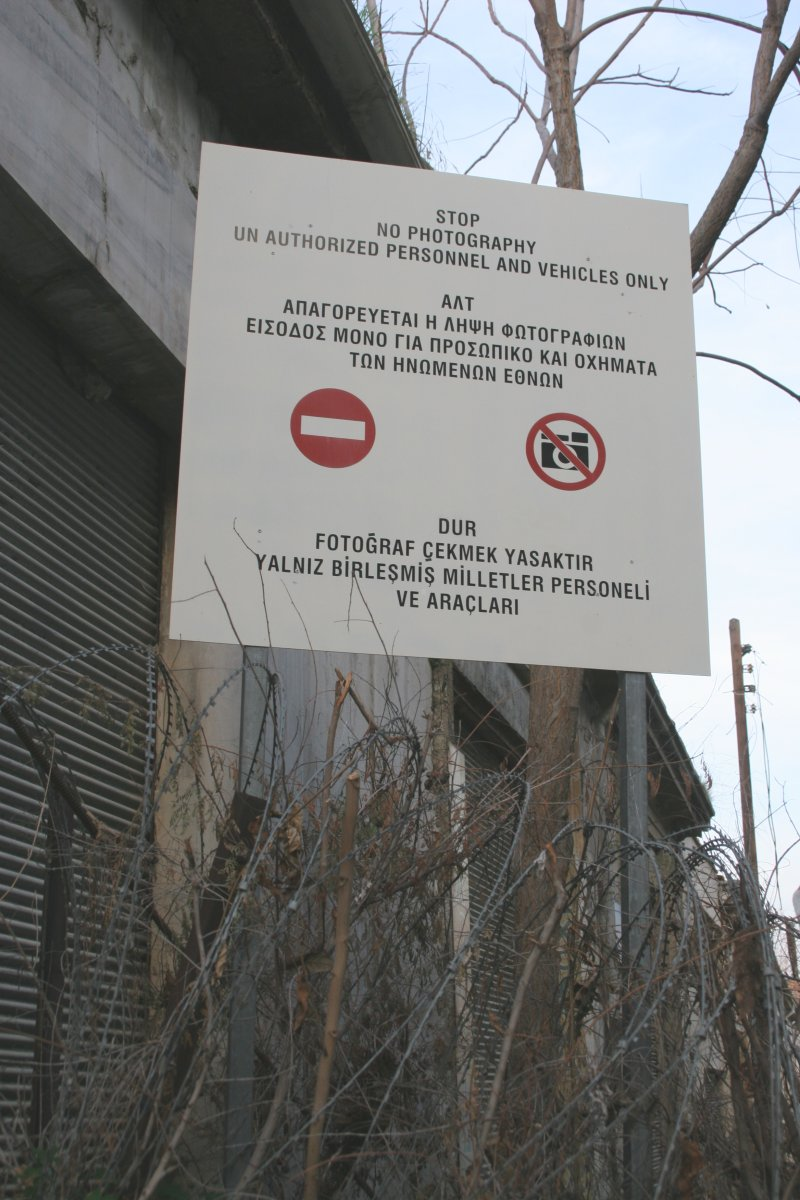
- Cyprus buffer zone
- Date: 12 December 1991
- Meeting no.: 3,022
- Code: S/RES/723 (Document)
- Subject: Cyprus
- Voting summary: 15 voted for; None voted against; None abstained
- Result: Adopted

Security Council composition
- Permanent members: China; France; Soviet Union; United Kingdom; United States
- Non-permanent members: Austria; Belgium; Côte d'Ivoire; Cuba; Ecuador; India; Romania; Yemen; Zaire; Zimbabwe

United Nations Security Council resolution 723, adopted unanimously on 12 December 1991, noted a report of the Secretary-General that, due to the existing circumstances, the presence of the United Nations Peacekeeping Force in Cyprus (UNFICYP) would continue to be essential for a peaceful settlement. The Council asked the Secretary-General to report back again before 31 May 1992, to follow the implementation of the resolution.

The Council reaffirmed its previous resolutions, including Resolution 365 (1974), expressed its concern over the situation, urged the involved parties to work together toward peace and once more extended the stationing of the Force in Cyprus, established in Resolution 186 (1964), until 15 June 1992.

According to the representatives of Austria and Canada noted that Resolution 698 (1991) required new measures to put the Force on a "secure financial basis", however by the adoption of the current resolution, no such plan had been put into place. As the permanent members of the Council opposed the use of assessed contributions to the peacekeeping mission, the Council therefore failed to fulfil its own undertaking in Resolution 698.

== See also ==
- Cyprus dispute
- List of United Nations Security Council Resolutions 701 to 800 (1991–1993)
- United Nations Buffer Zone in Cyprus
- Turkish invasion of Cyprus
