= United Nations Security Council Resolution 736 =

UN Security Council Resolution 736
- Location of Kyrgyzstan
- Date: 29 January 1992
- Meeting no.: 3,042
- Code: S/RES/736 (Document)
- Subject: Admission of new Members to the UN: Kyrgyzstan
- Result: Adopted

Security Council composition
- Permanent members: China; France; Russia; United Kingdom; United States
- Non-permanent members: Austria; Belgium; Cape Verde; Ecuador; Hungary; India; Japan; Morocco; Venezuela; Zimbabwe

United Nations Security Council resolution 736, adopted without a vote on 29 January 1992, after examining the application of the Kyrgyz Republic for membership in the United Nations, the Council recommended to the General Assembly that Kyrgyzstan be admitted.

== See also ==
- Member states of the United Nations
- List of United Nations Security Council Resolutions 701 to 800 (1991–1993)
