= United Nations Security Council Resolution 722 =

UN Security Council Resolution 722
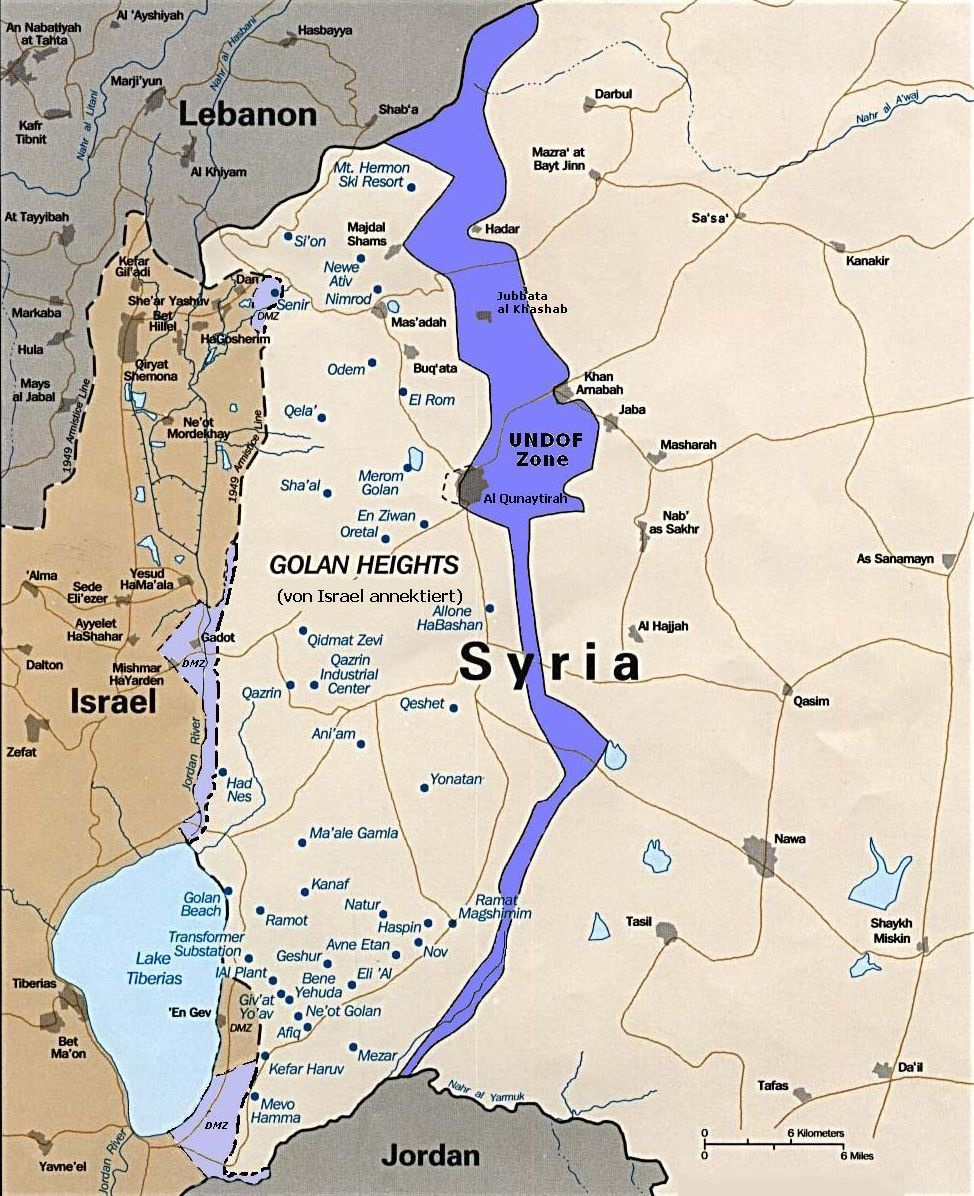
- UNDOF zone
- Date: 29 November 1991
- Meeting no.: 3,019
- Code: S/RES/722 (Document)
- Subject: Israel–Syria
- Voting summary: 15 voted for; None voted against; None abstained
- Result: Adopted

Security Council composition
- Permanent members: China; France; Soviet Union; United Kingdom; United States
- Non-permanent members: Austria; Belgium; Côte d'Ivoire; Cuba; Ecuador; India; Romania; Yemen; Zaire; Zimbabwe

United Nations Security Council resolution 722, adopted unanimously on 29 November 1991, after considering a report by the Secretary-General regarding the United Nations Disengagement Observer Force (UNDOF), the Council noted its efforts to establish a durable and just peace in the Middle East.

The resolution decided to call upon the parties concerned to immediately implement Resolution 338 (1973), it renewed the mandate of the Observer Force for another six months until 31 May 1992 and requested that the Secretary-General submit a report on the situation at the end of that period.

On the extension of the Force, the President of the Security Council said that while the situation was calm, it remained dangerous until a "comprehensive settlement covering all aspects of the Middle East problem can be reached."

== See also ==
- Arab–Israeli conflict
- Golan Heights
- Israel–Syria relations
- List of United Nations Security Council Resolutions 701 to 800 (1991–1993)
