= United Nations Security Council Resolution 754 =

UN Security Council Resolution 754
- Location of Slovenia
- Date: 18 May 1992
- Meeting no.: 3,077
- Code: S/RES/754 (Document)
- Subject: Admission of new Members to the UN: Slovenia
- Result: Adopted

Security Council composition
- Permanent members: China; France; Russia; United Kingdom; United States
- Non-permanent members: Austria; Belgium; Cape Verde; Ecuador; Hungary; India; Japan; Morocco; Venezuela; Zimbabwe

United Nations Security Council resolution 754, adopted without a vote on 18 May 1992, after examining the application of the Republic of Slovenia for membership in the United Nations, the Council recommended to the General Assembly that Slovenia be admitted. The recommendation came amid the breakup of Yugoslavia.

== See also ==
- Member states of the United Nations
- List of United Nations Security Council Resolutions 701 to 800 (1991–1993)
