= United Nations Security Council Resolution 744 =

UN Security Council Resolution 744
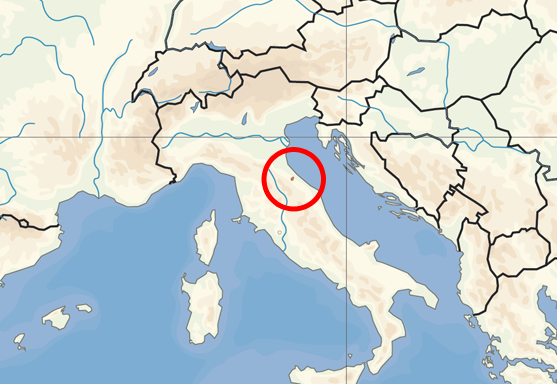
- Location of San Marino
- Date: 25 February 1992
- Meeting no.: 3,056
- Code: S/RES/744 (Document)
- Subject: Admission of new Members to the UN: San Marino
- Result: Adopted

Security Council composition
- Permanent members: China; France; Russia; United Kingdom; United States
- Non-permanent members: Austria; Belgium; Cape Verde; Ecuador; Hungary; India; Japan; Morocco; Venezuela; Zimbabwe

United Nations Security Council resolution 744, adopted without a vote on 25 February 1992, after examining the application of the Republic of San Marino for membership in the United Nations, the council recommended to the General Assembly that San Marino be admitted.

== See also ==
- Member states of the United Nations
- List of United Nations Security Council Resolutions 701 to 800 (1991–1993)
