= United Nations Security Council Resolution 716 =

UN Security Council Resolution 716
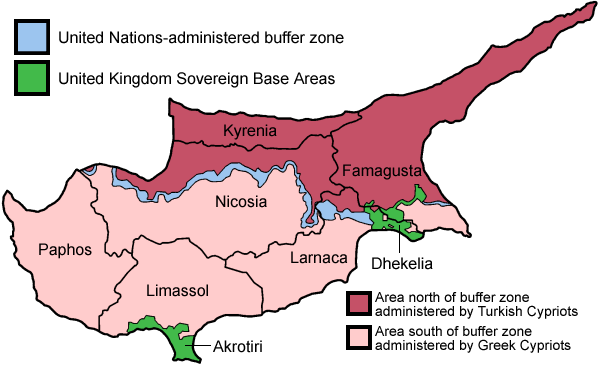
- Divided Cyprus
- Date: 11 October 1991
- Meeting no.: 3,013
- Code: S/RES/716 (Document)
- Subject: Cyprus
- Voting summary: 15 voted for; None voted against; None abstained
- Result: Adopted

Security Council composition
- Permanent members: China; France; Soviet Union; United Kingdom; United States
- Non-permanent members: Austria; Belgium; Côte d'Ivoire; Cuba; Ecuador; India; Romania; Yemen; Zaire; Zimbabwe

United Nations Security Council resolution 716, adopted unanimously on 11 October 1991, after noting a report of the Secretary-General, the Council recognised the progress made regarding the "Set of Ideas" in Cyprus and reaffirmed the efforts of the United Nations in solving the Cyprus dispute.

The Council reaffirmed its position on Cyprus, most recently in its Resolution 649 (1990) regarding the establishment of an independent, non-aligned, bi-communal federation without a union with another country. It called upon the parties involved to fully adhere to the aforementioned principles, requesting their co-operation with the Secretary-General and noting his intention to resume negotiations in November 1991 to complete an overall framework agreement. The best way to do this, the Council felt, was to consider a high-level international meeting chaired by the Secretary-General in which the leaders of the two communities in Cyprus, along with Greece and Turkey would participate.

The resolution ended by requesting the Secretary-General to report on whether sufficient progress had been made to convene the high-level meeting and to convey the development of the "Set of Ideas". By December 1991, efforts for a solution had failed, with the Secretary-General Javier Pérez de Cuéllar reiterating that Cyprus' "sovereignty will be equally shared but indivisible" and that the solution would be based on a "constitutional arrangement" negotiated on an equal platform and approved through separate referendums.

== See also ==
- Cyprus dispute
- List of United Nations Security Council Resolutions 701 to 800 (1991–1993)
- United Nations Buffer Zone in Cyprus
- Turkish invasion of Cyprus
