= United Nations Security Council Resolution 728 =

UN Security Council Resolution 728
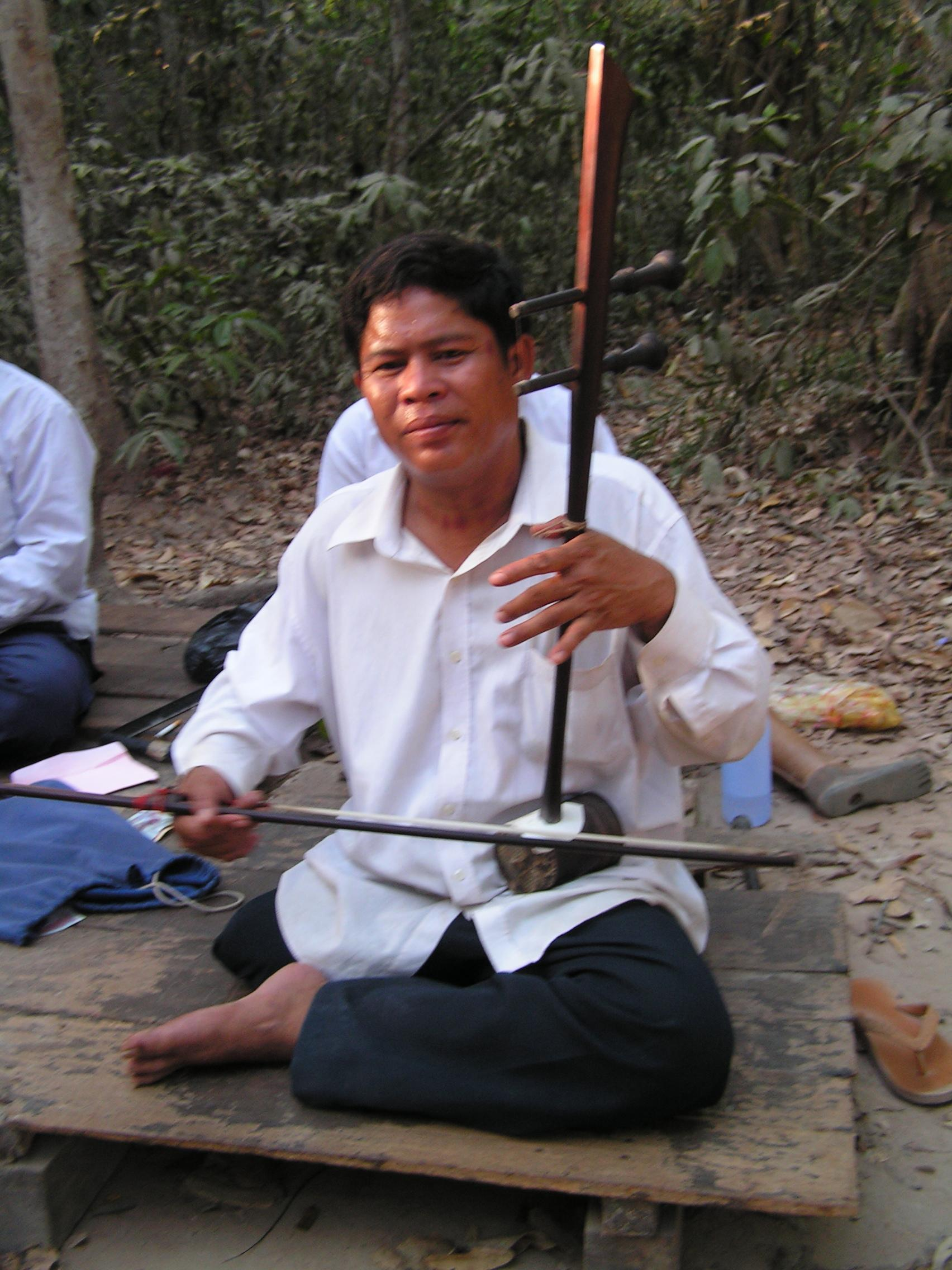
- Land mine victim in Cambodia
- Date: 8 January 1992
- Meeting no.: 3,029
- Code: S/RES/728 (Document)
- Subject: The situation in Cambodia
- Voting summary: 15 voted for; None voted against; None abstained
- Result: Adopted

Security Council composition
- Permanent members: China; France; Russia; United Kingdom; United States
- Non-permanent members: Austria; Belgium; Cape Verde; Ecuador; Hungary; India; Japan; Morocco; Venezuela; Zimbabwe

United Nations Security Council resolution 728, adopted unanimously on 8 January 1992, after recalling resolutions 668 (1990), 717 (1991) and 718 (1991), the Council welcomed the implementation by all parties of the agreement in Paris on 23 October 1991, but expressed concern at the existence of land mines in Cambodia.

The Council noted the establishment of a mine-awareness programme by a report of the Secretary-General in Resolution 717, and that the agreements allow the United Nations Transitional Authority in Cambodia to assist in the process of demining and to undertake training programmes. It also requested the Supreme National Council of Cambodia to co-operate with the United Nations Advance Mission in Cambodia with its expanded mandate of demining and training the local population, and again called upon all parties to observe the ceasefire.

== See also ==
- List of United Nations Security Council Resolutions 701 to 800 (1991–1993)
- Modern Cambodia
- Transition of the People's Republic of Kampuchea to Cambodia
