= United Nations Security Council Resolution 709 =

United Nations Security Council resolution

UN Security Council Resolution 709
- Location of Estonia
- Date: 12 September 1991
- Meeting no.: 3,007
- Code: S/RES/709 (Document)
- Subject: Admission of new Members to the UN: Estonia
- Result: Adopted

Security Council composition
- Permanent members: China; France; Soviet Union; United Kingdom; United States
- Non-permanent members: Austria; Belgium; Côte d'Ivoire; Cuba; Ecuador; India; Romania; Yemen; Zaire; Zimbabwe

United Nations Security Council resolution 709, adopted without a vote on 12 September 1991, after examining the application of the Republic of Estonia for membership in the United Nations, the Council recommended to the General Assembly that Estonia be admitted.

On 17 September 1991, the General Assembly admitted Estonia under Resolution 46/4.

== See also ==
- List of United Nations member states
- List of United Nations Security Council Resolutions 701 to 800 (1991–1993)
