= United Nations Security Council Resolution 784 =

UN Security Council Resolution 784
- El Salvador
- Date: 30 October 1992
- Meeting no.: 3,129
- Code: S/RES/784 (Document)
- Subject: El Salvador
- Voting summary: 15 voted for; None voted against; None abstained
- Result: Adopted

Security Council composition
- Permanent members: China; France; Russia; United Kingdom; United States
- Non-permanent members: Austria; Belgium; Cape Verde; Ecuador; Hungary; India; Japan; Morocco; Venezuela; Zimbabwe

United Nations Security Council resolution 784, adopted unanimously on 30 October 1992, after recalling resolutions 637 (1989), 693 (1991), 714 (1991) and 729 (1992), the council approved a decision by the Secretary-General Boutros Boutros-Ghali to extend the mandate of the United Nations Observer Mission in El Salvador (ONUSAL) for a further month until 30 November 1992.

Within this time frame, the resolution requested the secretary-general to submit recommendations on any future extension of the mandate, on the mandate and strength that ONUSAL will need in order to verify the implementation of the final phases of the peace process in El Salvador together with their financial implications. It also urged both parties, the Farabundo Martí National Liberation Front and Government of El Salvador, to implement and respect the agreements signed by them in Mexico City on 16 January 1992.

Boutros-Ghali later informed the council on 11 November 1992, that both parties had agreed to his proposal to end the conflict by 15 December 1992.

== See also ==
- List of United Nations Security Council Resolutions 701 to 800 (1991–1993)
- Salvadoran Civil War
- United Nations Observer Group in Central America
