= United Nations Security Council Resolution 729 =

UN Security Council Resolution 729
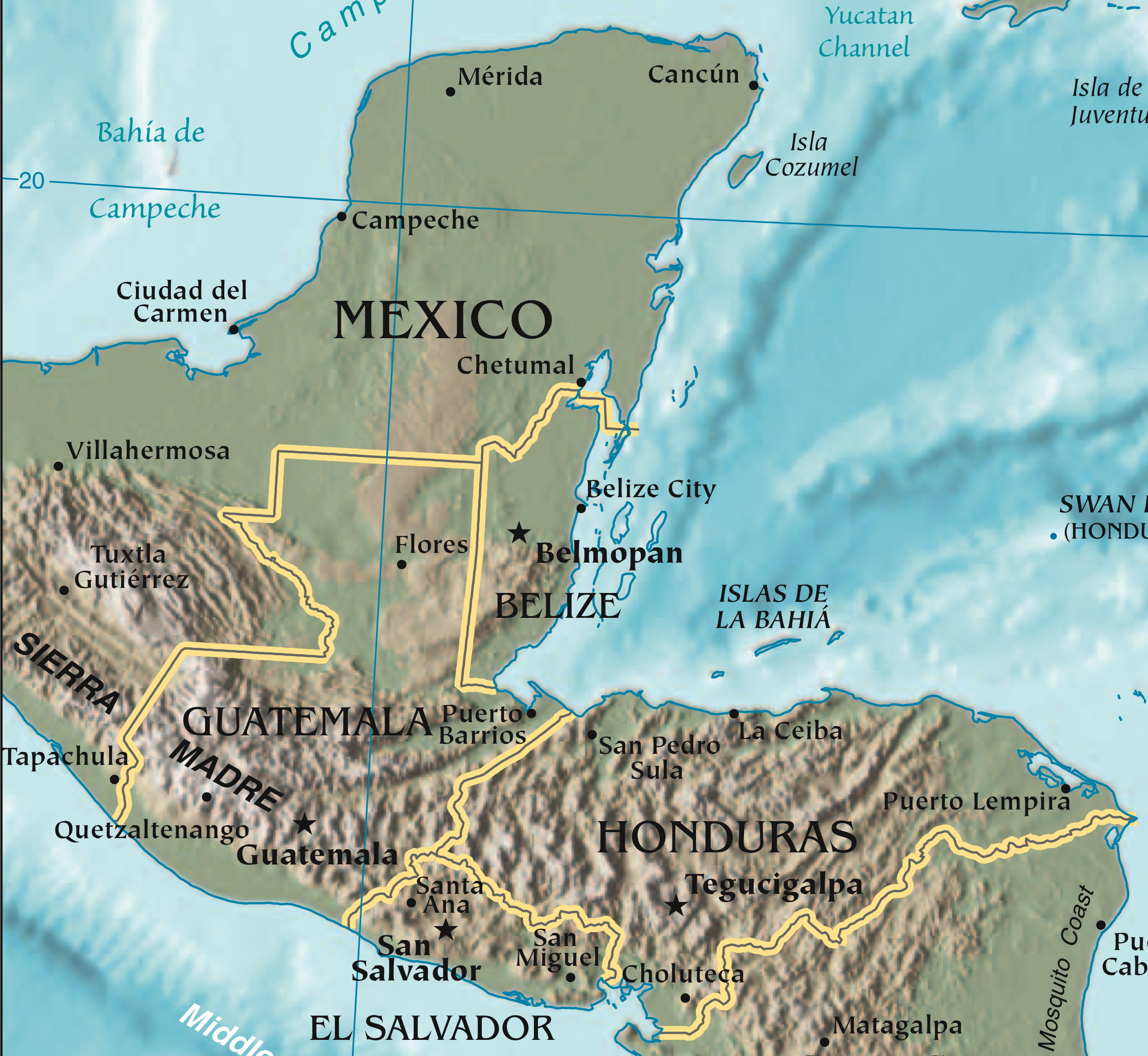
- El Salvador and region
- Date: 14 January 1992
- Meeting no.: 3,030
- Code: S/RES/729 (Document)
- Subject: El Salvador
- Voting summary: 15 voted for; None voted against; None abstained
- Result: Adopted

Security Council composition
- Permanent members: China; France; Russia; United Kingdom; United States
- Non-permanent members: Austria; Belgium; Cape Verde; Ecuador; Hungary; India; Japan; Morocco; Venezuela; Zimbabwe

United Nations Security Council resolution 729, adopted unanimously on 14 January 1992, after recalling resolutions 637 (1989), 693 (1991) and 714 (1991), the Council welcomed the conclusion of agreements by the Government of El Salvador and the Farabundo Martí National Liberation Front to bring about an end to the ongoing civil war in El Salvador and the Secretary-General's intention to end the United Nations Observer Mission in El Salvador.

The Council decided, therefore, to enlarge the mandate of the Observer Mission to include verification and monitoring of all agreements once they were signed in Mexico City, particularly those regarding the cessation of the armed conflict and the establishment of a national civil police. The expanded mission deployed an extra 372 military personnel and 631 police officers, the monitoring of a ceasefire agreement set to take effect on 1 February 1992, and the maintenance of public order. It also decided to extend the mandate of the Mission until 31 October 1992 and its future will then be reviewed in accordance with the Secretary-General's recommendation.

The resolution also urged full co-operation from both parties with the Mission, reaffirmed the continuing mission of good offices of the Secretary-General, and the support of Colombia, Mexico, Spain and Venezuela in the region.

== See also ==
- List of United Nations Security Council Resolutions 701 to 800 (1991–1993)
- Salvadoran Civil War
- United Nations Observer Group in Central America
