= United Nations Security Council Resolution 718 =

United Nations Security Council resolution

UN Security Council Resolution 718
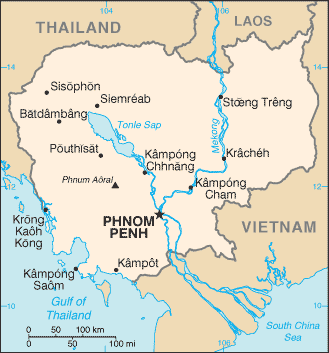
- Cambodia
- Date: 31 October 1991
- Meeting no.: 3,015
- Code: S/RES/718 (Document)
- Subject: The situation in Cambodia
- Voting summary: 15 voted for; None voted against; None abstained
- Result: Adopted

Security Council composition
- Permanent members: China; France; Soviet Union; United Kingdom; United States
- Non-permanent members: Austria; Belgium; Côte d'Ivoire; Cuba; Ecuador; India; Romania; Yemen; Zaire; Zimbabwe

United Nations Security Council resolution 718, adopted unanimously on 31 October 1991, after recalling resolutions 668 (1990) and 717 (1991), and noting that at the Paris Conference, a political agreement was signed by parties to the situation in Cambodia, the Council authorised the Secretary-General to submit a report on the costs for the United Nations Transitional Authority in Cambodia, prior to its establishment.

The Council welcomed the political agreement, which the four parties decided to create "a system of liberal democracy, on the basis of pluralism." It went on to authorise the Secretary-General to designate a special representative for Cambodia to act on his behalf, welcoming his decision to send a survey mission to the country to prepare plans for implementing the mandate agreed at the Paris Conference. The resolution also called for the co-operation of the Supreme National Council of Cambodia and all parties with the Mission regarding the implementation of the agreements in the political settlement, and for all parties to observe a ceasefire.

The Secretary-General's report was examined in Resolution 745.

== See also ==
- List of United Nations Security Council Resolutions 701 to 800 (1991–1993)
- Modern Cambodia
- Transition of the People's Republic of Kampuchea to Cambodia
- United Nations Advance Mission in Cambodia
