= United Nations Security Council Resolution 717 =

UN Security Council Resolution 717
- Cambodia
- Date: 16 October 1991
- Meeting no.: 3,014
- Code: S/RES/717 (Document)
- Subject: The situation in Cambodia
- Voting summary: 15 voted for; None voted against; None abstained
- Result: Adopted

Security Council composition
- Permanent members: China; France; Soviet Union; United Kingdom; United States
- Non-permanent members: Austria; Belgium; Côte d'Ivoire; Cuba; Ecuador; India; Romania; Yemen; Zaire; Zimbabwe

United Nations Security Council resolution 717, adopted unanimously on 16 October 1991, after noting a report by the Secretary-General Javier Pérez de Cuéllar and reaffirming Resolution 668 (1990), the Council decided to establish the United Nations Advance Mission in Cambodia (UNAMIC) immediately after the signing of agreements for a political settlement in Cambodia.

UNAMIC would consist of the deployment of 1,504 personnel in order to help the Cambodian parties maintain a ceasefire until the deployment of the United Nations Transitional Authority in Cambodia. The resolution called for the co-operation of the Supreme National Council of Cambodia and all parties with the Mission regarding the implementation of the agreements in the political settlement, welcoming the decision of the co-chairman of the Paris Conference to reconvene it at an early date in order to sign the agreements.

Finally, Resolution 717 required the Secretary-General to submit a report on developments in the situation by 15 November 1991.

== See also ==
- List of United Nations Security Council Resolutions 701 to 800 (1991–1993)
- Modern Cambodia
- United Nations Security Council Resolution 718
- Transition of the People's Republic of Kampuchea to Cambodia
