= United Nations Security Council Resolution 714 =

UN Security Council Resolution 714
- El Salvador
- Date: 30 September 1991
- Meeting no.: 3,010
- Code: S/RES/714 (Document)
- Subject: El Salvador
- Voting summary: 15 voted for; None voted against; None abstained
- Result: Adopted

Security Council composition
- Permanent members: China; France; Soviet Union; United Kingdom; United States
- Non-permanent members: Austria; Belgium; Côte d'Ivoire; Cuba; Ecuador; India; Romania; Yemen; Zaire; Zimbabwe

United Nations Security Council resolution 714, adopted unanimously on 30 September 1991, after recalling resolutions 637 (1989) and 693 (1991), the Council welcomed the recent signing of the New York Agreement by the Government of El Salvador and the Farabundo Martí National Liberation Front to bring about an end to the ongoing civil war in El Salvador.

The Council commended the work of the Secretary-General, Javier Pérez de Cuéllar, and his Personal Representative for Central America, as well as the efforts of the "Group of Friends" Colombia, Mexico, Spain and Venezuela in the peace process. It also urged the parties that, in the next round of talks scheduled for October 1991, to continue intensive and sustained negotiations in order to reach a ceasefire at the earliest possible date, further calling for restraint and co-operation with the United Nations Observer Mission in El Salvador.

The New York Agreement, signed on 25 September 1991 at the United Nations Headquarters, provided guarantees for a solution to the situation in El Salvador. Provisions included the establishment of the National Commission for the Consolidation of Peace (COPAZ), responsible for overseeing all political agreements reached by both parties and endorsed by the Security Council.

== See also ==
- List of United Nations Security Council Resolutions 701 to 800 (1991–1993)
- Salvadoran Civil War
- United Nations Observer Group in Central America
