= United Nations Security Council Resolution 668 =

UN Security Council Resolution 668
- Cambodia
- Date: 20 September 1990
- Meeting no.: 2,941
- Code: S/RES/668 (Document)
- Subject: The situation in Cambodia
- Voting summary: 15 voted for; None voted against; None abstained
- Result: Adopted

Security Council composition
- Permanent members: China; France; Soviet Union; United Kingdom; United States
- Non-permanent members: Canada; Colombia; Côte d'Ivoire; Cuba; Ethiopia; Finland; Malaysia; Romania; Yemen; Zaire

United Nations Security Council resolution 668, adopted unanimously on 20 September 1990, after noting the ongoing political discussions and efforts regarding a just and lasting peaceful situation in Cambodia, the council endorsed the political framework that would enable the Cambodian people to exercise their right to self-determination through U.N.-organised elections.

The council had been considering the question of Cambodia and the occupation of the country by Vietnamese troops for almost a decade, however, the council could not act due to lack of agreement amongst its permanent members. Instead, it was addressed by the General Assembly. After the fall of the Khmer Rouge in 1979, Vietnam installed a puppet government, which was opposed by several groups in the country, including the United National Front for an Independent, Neutral, Peaceful and Cooperative Cambodia, Khmer People's Liberation Front and the Party of Democratic Kampuchea, but supported by both Vietnam and the Soviet Union. Representatives from each party gathered for the Paris Conference in 1989, but an agreement was not reached.

After the Fall of Nations, the September 1990 Sino-Vietnamese Chengdu Conference favored the Beijing-proposed 13 members dialogue instead of the Hanoi-proposed 12 members dialogue solution. Following discussions in Indonesia and Japan in October 1990, the parties agreed to a plan in which they would be guided by certain principles in order to solve the Cambodian problem. The Security Council, in Resolution 668, acknowledged and welcomed the agreement.

The resolution went on to welcome the creation of a Supreme National Council as a source of authority throughout the transitional period. It also requested other countries and the Secretary-General to continue to assist in the peace settlement. A move in the General Assembly to endorse the peace process was also approved in Resolution 45/3 on 15 October 1990.

== See also ==
- List of United Nations Security Council Resolutions 601 to 700 (1987–1991)
- Modern Cambodia
- Resolutions 717 (1991), 718 (1991)
- Transition of the People's Republic of Kampuchea to Cambodia
- United Nations Transitional Authority in Cambodia
