= United Nations Security Council Resolution 637 =

UN Security Council Resolution 637
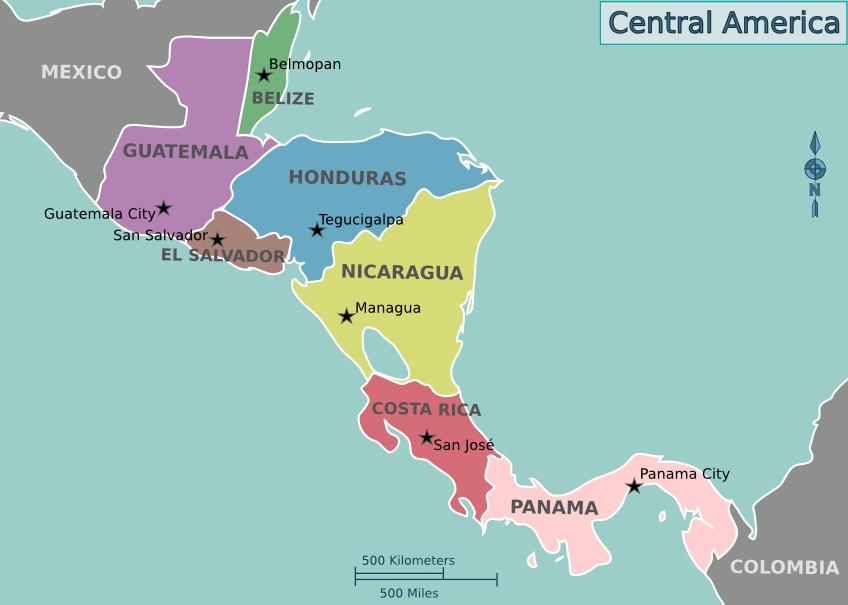
- Central America
- Date: 27 July 1989
- Meeting no.: 2,871
- Code: S/RES/637 (Document)
- Subject: Central America
- Voting summary: 15 voted for; None voted against; None abstained
- Result: Adopted

Security Council composition
- Permanent members: China; France; Soviet Union; United Kingdom; United States
- Non-permanent members: Algeria; Brazil; Canada; Colombia; Ethiopia; Finland; Malaysia; Nepal; Senegal; Yugoslavia

United Nations Security Council Resolution 637 was adopted unanimously on 27 July 1989. After recalling Resolution 530 (1983) and Resolution 562 (1985) and numerous General Assembly resolutions, the Security Council commended the desire for peace in Central America noting the Joint Declaration made by the Presidents of Central American nations in 1988 and 1989.

Resolution 637 went on to express its support for the Esquipulas Peace Agreement and the Joint Declarations, calling upon the Presidents to continue their efforts to achieve a firm and lasting peace in Central America. It also appealed to countries with links and interests to the region to support the efforts, including those which support irregular forces and insurrectional movements in the area immediately halt the aid, with the exception of humanitarian aid.

The council also supported the Secretary-General in his efforts and requested him to keep them informed on developments in the situation.

== See also ==
- Contras
- History of Central America
- List of United Nations Security Council Resolutions 601 to 700 (1987–1991)
- United Nations Observer Group in Central America
- United Nations Security Council Resolution 644
