= United Nations Security Council Resolution 693 =

UN Security Council Resolution 693
- El Salvador
- Date: 20 May 1991
- Meeting no.: 2,988
- Code: S/RES/693 (Document)
- Subject: Central America
- Voting summary: 15 voted for; None voted against; None abstained
- Result: Adopted

Security Council composition
- Permanent members: China; France; Soviet Union; United Kingdom; United States
- Non-permanent members: Austria; Belgium; Côte d'Ivoire; Cuba; Ecuador; India; Romania; Yemen; Zaire; Zimbabwe

United Nations Security Council resolution 693 of 20 May 1991 established the United Nations Observer Mission in El Salvador to verify the military-led government of El Salvador and the militia Farabundo Martí National Liberation Front's compliance with human rights in accordance with an agreement both parties signed in San Jose in 1990.

The council established the Mission for an initial period of twelve months, calling on both parties to continue the process of negotiations to help end the Salvadoran Civil War and also co-operate with the Secretary-General Javier Pérez de Cuéllar and his representative.

According to Boutros Boutros-Ghali, Secretary-General of the United Nations from 1992 to 1997, the Mission in El Salvador was the "first international mission to undertake verification within a sovereign United Nations Member State, prior to a cease-fire agreement."

== See also ==
- History of El Salvador
- List of United Nations Security Council Resolutions 601 to 700 (1987–1991)
- United Nations Observer Group in Central America
