= United Nations Security Council Resolution 114 =

UN Security Council Resolution 114
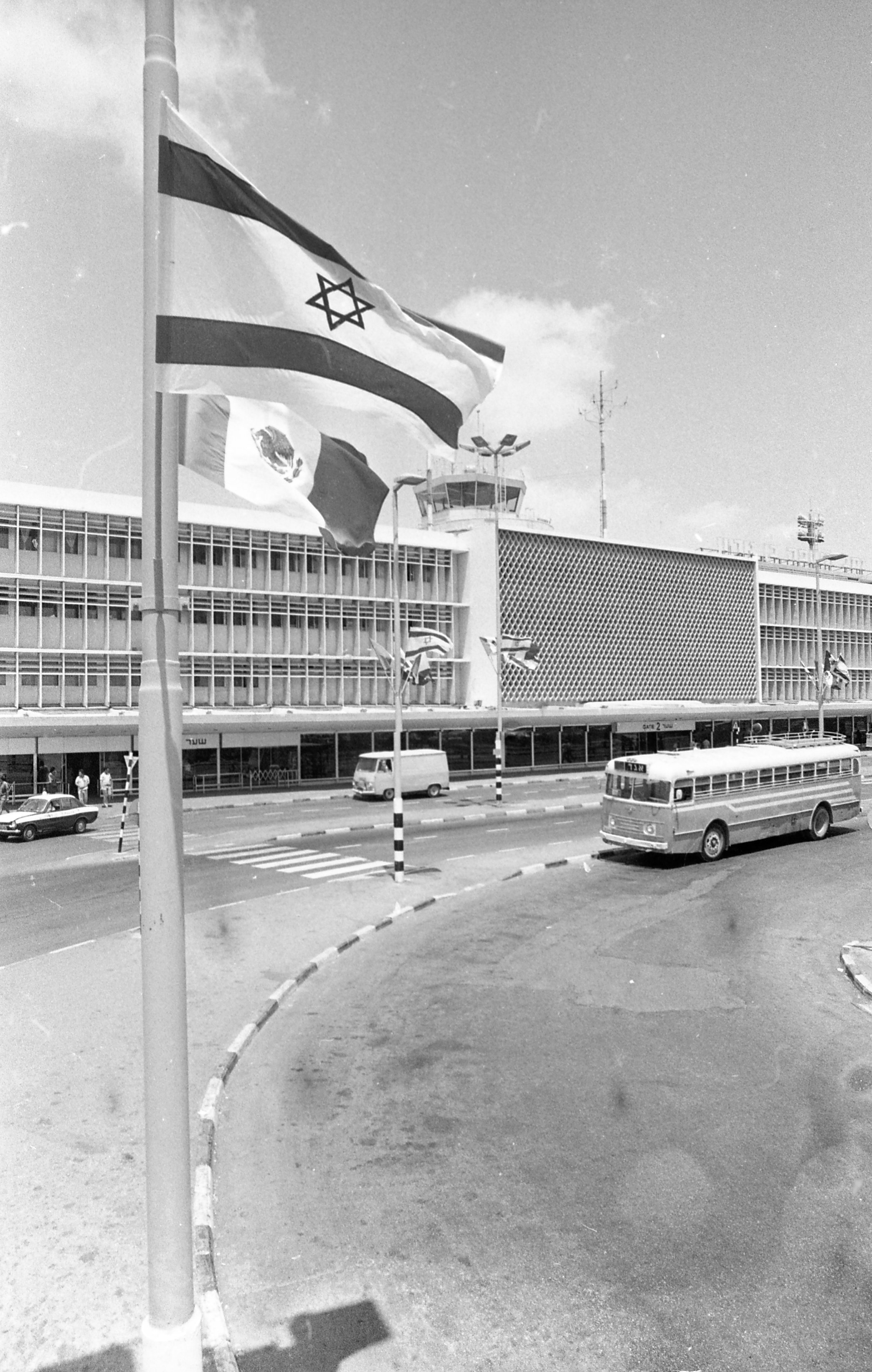
- Israel flag
- Date: June 4 1956
- Meeting no.: 728
- Code: S/3605 (Document)
- Subject: The Palestine Question
- Voting summary: 11 voted for; None voted against; None abstained
- Result: Adopted

Security Council composition
- Permanent members: China; France; Soviet Union; United Kingdom; United States
- Non-permanent members: Australia; Belgium; Cuba; Iran; Peru; Yugoslavia

United Nations Security Council Resolution 114, adopted unanimously on June 4, 1956, after receiving a report from the Secretary-General the Council noted that progress had been made towards the adoption of the specific measures set out in United Nations Security Council Resolution 113 but that full compliance with the General Armistice Agreements and a host of Council Resolutions had not yet been effected. The Council declared that all parties to the Armistice Agreements should cooperate with the Secretary-General and the Chief of Staff of the United Nations Truce Supervision Organization in Palestine and that United Nations observers must be given full freedom of movement.

The Council further requested that the Chief of Staff report to them whenever any action undertaken by one party to an Armistice Agreement constitutes a serious violation of that agreement and that the Secretary-General continue his good offices with the parties and report to them as appropriate.

== See also ==
- List of United Nations Security Council Resolutions 101 to 200 (1953–1965)
