= United Nations Security Council Resolution 160 =

United Nations Security Council resolution

UN Security Council Resolution 160
- Date: October 7 1960
- Meeting no.: 908
- Code: S/4549 (Document)
- Subject: Admission of new Members to the UN: Nigeria
- Voting summary: 11 voted for; None voted against; None abstained
- Result: Adopted

Security Council composition
- Permanent members: China; France; Soviet Union; United Kingdom; United States
- Non-permanent members: Argentina; Ceylon; Ecuador; Italy; Poland; Tunisia

United Nations Security Council Resolution 160, adopted on October 7, 1960, after examining the application of the Federation of Nigeria for membership in the United Nations the Council recommended to the General Assembly that the Federation of Nigeria be admitted.

The resolution was adopted unanimously by all 11 members of the Council.

== See also ==
- List of United Nations Security Council Resolutions 101 to 200 (1953–1965)
