= United Nations Security Council Resolution 164 =

UN Security Council Resolution 164
- Date: July 22 1961
- Meeting no.: 962
- Code: S/4882 (Document)
- Subject: Complaint by Tunisia
- Voting summary: 10 voted for; None voted against; None abstained; 1 present not voting
- Result: Adopted

Security Council composition
- Permanent members: China; France; Soviet Union; United Kingdom; United States
- Non-permanent members: Ceylon; Chile; Ecuador; Liberia; Turkey; United Arab Republic

United Nations Security Council Resolution 164, adopted on July 22, 1961, the Council, in regard to the situation in Tunisia, called for an immediate ceasefire and return of all armed forces to their original positions.

Two days prior to this resolution, Tunisia had called for an urgent meeting of the Security Council to consider its complaint against perceived acts of aggression by France on the sovereignty and security of Tunisia. Since July 19, Bizerte had been under attack by the French Navy and air force; France claimed it was protecting installations and freedom of communications at the site.

The resolution was approved by ten votes to none; France was present but did not participate in the voting.

A majority of Member States requested a special session of the General Assembly to take place between August 21 to 25 to discuss the situation.

== See also ==
- History of modern Tunisia
- List of United Nations Security Council Resolutions 101 to 200 (1953–1965)
