= United Nations Security Council Resolution 192 =

UN Security Council Resolution 192
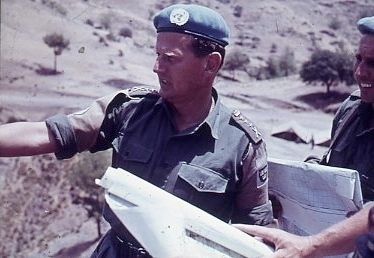
- Peacekeeping in Cyprus
- Date: June 20 1964
- Meeting no.: 1139
- Code: S/5778 (Document)
- Subject: The Cyprus Question
- Voting summary: 11 voted for; None voted against; None abstained
- Result: Adopted

Security Council composition
- Permanent members: China; France; Soviet Union; United Kingdom; United States
- Non-permanent members: Bolivia; Brazil; Czechoslovakia; Ivory Coast; Morocco; Norway

United Nations Security Council Resolution 192, adopted unanimously on June 20, 1964, after a report by the Secretary-General regarding the United Nations Peacekeeping Force in Cyprus, the Council reaffirmed resolutions 186 and 187 and extended the stationing of the Force those resolutions established for an additional period of 3 months, to end on September 26, 1964.

== See also ==
- Cyprus dispute
- List of United Nations Security Council Resolutions 101 to 200 (1953–1965)
