= United Nations Security Council Resolution 165 =

UN Security Council Resolution 165
- Date: September 26 1961
- Meeting no.: 968
- Code: S/4955 (Document)
- Subject: Admission of new Members to the UN: Sierra Leone
- Voting summary: 11 voted for; None voted against; None abstained
- Result: Adopted

Security Council composition
- Permanent members: China; France; Soviet Union; United Kingdom; United States
- Non-permanent members: Ceylon; Chile; Ecuador; Liberia; Turkey; United Arab Republic

United Nations Security Council Resolution 165, adopted unanimously on September 26, 1961, after examining the application of the Republic of Sierra Leone for membership in the United Nations, the Council recommended to the General Assembly that Sierra Leone be admitted.

== See also ==
- List of United Nations Security Council Resolutions 101 to 200 (1953–1965)
