= United Nations Security Council Resolution 162 =

UN Security Council Resolution 162
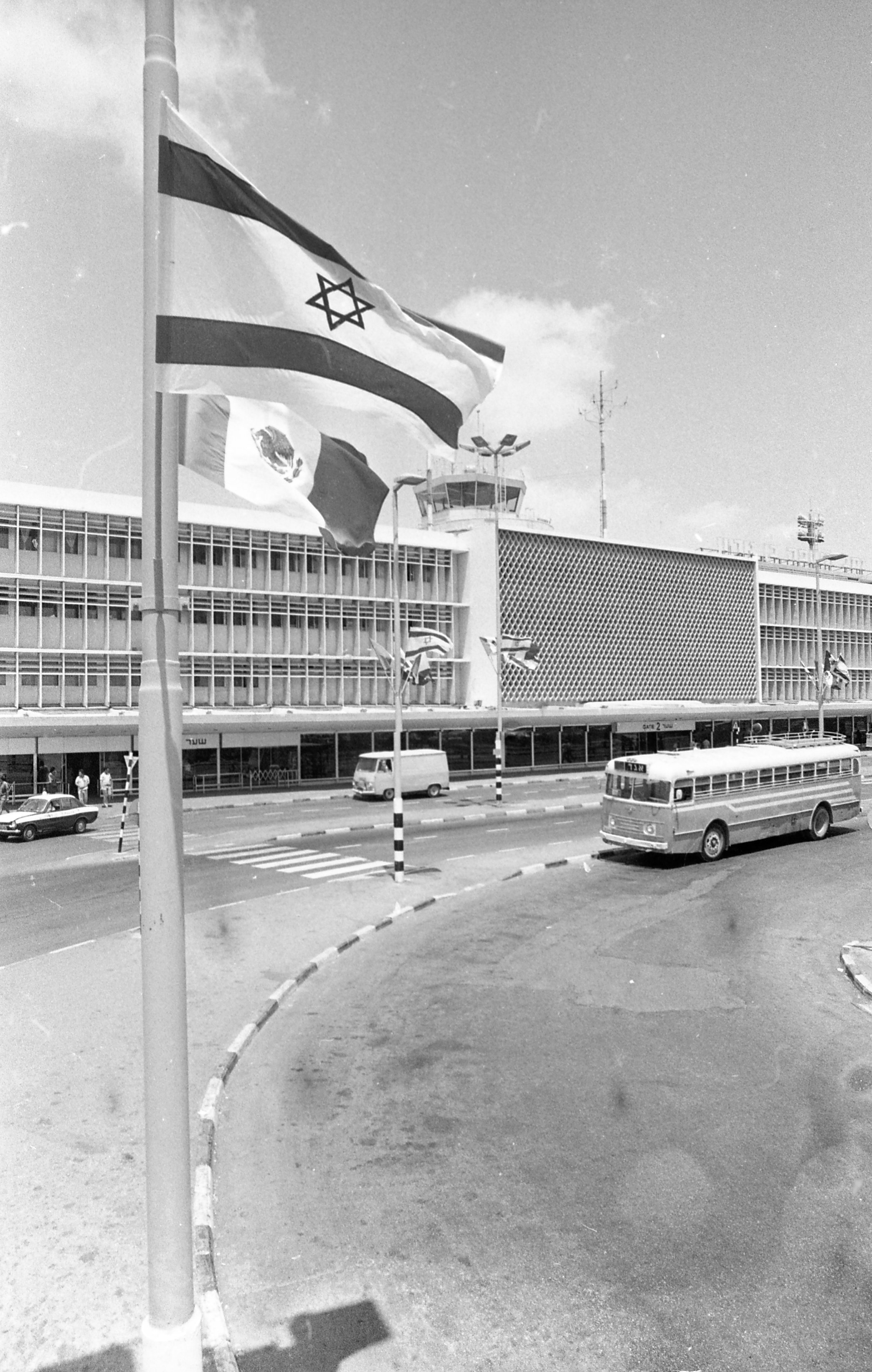
- Israel flag
- Date: April 11 1961
- Meeting no.: 949
- Code: S/4788 (Document)
- Subject: The Palestine Question
- Voting summary: 8 voted for; None voted against; 3 abstained
- Result: Adopted

Security Council composition
- Permanent members: China; France; Soviet Union; United Kingdom; United States
- Non-permanent members: Ceylon; Chile; Ecuador; Liberia; Turkey; United Arab Republic

United Nations Security Council Resolution 162, adopted on April 11, 1961, after a complaint submitted by Jordan and noting a decision of the Jordan–Israel Mixed Armistice Commission, the Council endorsed that body's decision and urged Israel to comply with it. The Council requested the member of the Commission to co-operate to ensure that the General Armistice Agreement between Israel and Jordan will be complied with. Representatives from Jordan and Israel were present at the meeting.

Resolution 162 was adopted by eight votes in favour, none against, and three abstentions from Ceylon, the Soviet Union and the United Arab Republic.

== See also ==
- List of United Nations Security Council Resolutions 101 to 200 (1953–1965)
