= United Nations Security Council Resolution 170 =

UN Security Council Resolution 170
- Date: December 14 1961
- Meeting no.: 986
- Code: S/5024 (Document)
- Subject: Admission of new Members to the UN: Tanganyika
- Voting summary: 11 voted for; None voted against; None abstained
- Result: Adopted

Security Council composition
- Permanent members: China; France; Soviet Union; United Kingdom; United States
- Non-permanent members: Ceylon; Chile; Ecuador; Liberia; Turkey; United Arab Republic

United Nations Security Council Resolution 170, adopted unanimously on December 14, 1961, examined the application of Tanganyika for membership in the United Nations. The Council recommended to the General Assembly that Tanganyika be admitted.

== See also ==
- List of United Nations Security Council Resolutions 101 to 200 (1953–1965)
