= United Nations Security Council Resolution 163 =

UN Security Council Resolution 163
- Date: June 9 1961
- Meeting no.: 956
- Code: S/4835 (Document)
- Subject: Question relating to Angola
- Voting summary: 9 voted for; None voted against; 2 abstained
- Result: Adopted

Security Council composition
- Permanent members: China; France; Soviet Union; United Kingdom; United States
- Non-permanent members: Ceylon; Chile; Ecuador; Liberia; Turkey; United Arab Republic

United Nations Security Council Resolution 163, adopted on June 9, 1961, after General Assembly Resolution 1603 declaring Angola a Non-Self-Governing Territory the Council reaffirmed that resolution calling on Portugal to act in accordance with the terms. The Council called upon the Portuguese to desist from repressive measures and to extend every facility to the Sub-Committee on the Situation in Angola, appointed under the terms of the GA resolution, as well as expressing its hope that a peaceful solution will be found and requested that the Sub-Committee report to the Council and GA as soon as possible.

A number of member states had expressed concern at the human rights situation in Angola, including denial of the right to self-determination, massacres and the armed suppression of the Angolan people. Representatives from Portugal, India, Ghana, the Congo (Leopoldville), the Congo (Brazzaville), Nigeria, Mali, Ethiopia and Morocco were invited to participate in the meetings.

The resolution was adopted by nine votes to none; France and the United Kingdom abstained.

== See also ==
- Angolan War of Independence
- List of United Nations Security Council Resolutions 101 to 200 (1953–1965)
- Portuguese Colonial War
