= United Nations Security Council Resolution 111 =

UN Security Council Resolution 111
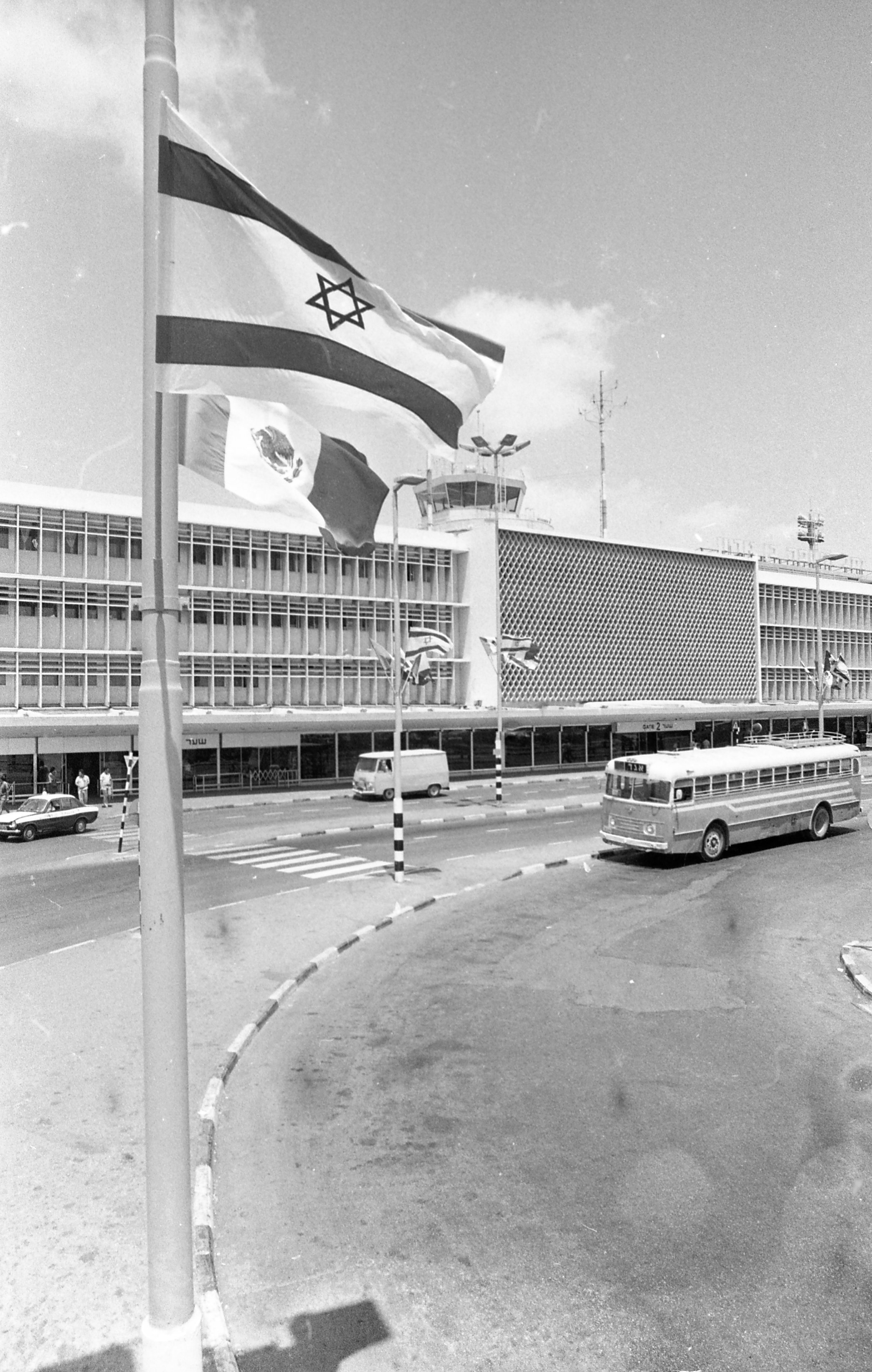
- Israel flag
- Date: January 19 1956
- Meeting no.: 715
- Code: S/3538 (Document)
- Subject: The Palestine Question
- Voting summary: 11 voted for; None voted against; None abstained
- Result: Adopted

Security Council composition
- Permanent members: China; France; Soviet Union; United Kingdom; United States
- Non-permanent members: Australia; Belgium; Cuba; Iran; Peru; Yugoslavia

United Nations Security Council Resolution 111, adopted unanimously on January 19, 1956, noted that according to the Chief of Staff of the United Nations Truce Supervision Organization in Palestine, Israel was in direct violation of the General Armistice Agreement and that there was interference by the Syrian Authorities with Israeli activities on Lake Tiberias. The Council held that this interference in no way justified Israel’s actions and condemned her for them.

The Council called upon both sides to live up to their obligations under the GAA, requested the Chief of Staff to pursue his suggestions for improving the situation in the area, called for an immediate exchange of all military prisoners and called upon both sides to work with the Chief of Staff.

== See also ==
- List of United Nations Security Council Resolutions 101 to 200 (1953–1965)
- United Nations Security Council Resolution 108
