= United Nations Security Council Resolution 167 =

UN Security Council Resolution 167
- Date: October 25 1961
- Meeting no.: 971
- Code: S/4969 (Document)
- Subject: Admission of new Members to the UN: Mauritania
- Voting summary: 9 voted for; 1 voted against; 1 abstained
- Result: Adopted

Security Council composition
- Permanent members: China; France; Soviet Union; United Kingdom; United States
- Non-permanent members: Ceylon; Chile; Ecuador; Liberia; Turkey; United Arab Republic

United Nations Security Council Resolution 167, adopted on October 25, 1961, after examining the application of the Islamic Republic of Mauritania for membership in the United Nations the Council recommended to the General Assembly that the Islamic Republic of Mauritania be admitted.

The resolution was approved with nine votes in favour and one against from the United Arab Republic; the Soviet Union abstained.

== See also ==
- List of United Nations Security Council Resolutions 101 to 200 (1953–1965)
