= United Nations Security Council Resolution 121 =

1956 UN Security Council recommendation that Japan be admitted to the UN

UN Security Council Resolution 121
- Date: December 12 1956
- Meeting no.: 756
- Code: S/3758 (Document)
- Subject: Admission of new Members to the UN: Japan
- Voting summary: 11 voted for; None voted against; None abstained
- Result: Adopted

Security Council composition
- Permanent members: China; France; Soviet Union; United Kingdom; United States
- Non-permanent members: Australia; Belgium; Cuba; Iran; Peru; Yugoslavia

United Nations Security Council Resolution 121, adopted unanimously on December 12, 1956, after examining the application of Japan for membership in the United Nations, the UN Security Council recommended to the General Assembly that Japan be admitted. The United States first invited Japan to join the UN in 1955 but their admission was vetoed by The Soviet Union in protest of the Republic of China vetoing membership for the Mongolian People's Republic as a part of a 18 nation membership nomination process. The USSR proposed a second resolution to admit both Mongolia and Japan together; the draft resolution was voted upon with only the USSR in favor, and the 10 other members abstaining.

== See also ==
- List of United Nations Security Council Resolutions 101 to 200 (1953–1965)
- Japan and the United Nations
