= United Nations Security Council Resolution 182 =

UN Security Council Resolution 182
- Date: December 4 1963
- Meeting no.: 1078
- Code: S/5471 (Document)
- Subject: Question relating to the policies of apartheid of the Government of the Republic of South Africa
- Voting summary: 11 voted for; None voted against; None abstained
- Result: Adopted

Security Council composition
- Permanent members: China; France; Soviet Union; United Kingdom; United States
- Non-permanent members: Brazil; Ghana; Morocco; Norway; Philippines; Venezuela

United Nations Security Council Resolution 182, adopted on December 4, 1963, after the Republic of South Africa refused to co-operate with Resolution 181, the Council again requested South Africa comply with previous resolutions and that all States comply with resolution 181. The Council then requested the Secretary-General establish a small group of experts to examine ways of resolving the situation in South Africa and that he report back to the Council no later than June 1, 1964.

The resolution was adopted unanimously by all 11 members of the Council.

== See also ==
- List of United Nations Security Council Resolutions 101 to 200 (1953–1965)
- South Africa under apartheid
