= United Nations Security Council Resolution 195 =

United Nations Security Council resolution

UN Security Council Resolution 195
- Date: October 9 1964
- Meeting no.: 1160
- Code: S/6005 (Document)
- Subject: Admission of new Members to the UN: Malawi
- Voting summary: 11 voted for; None voted against; None abstained
- Result: Adopted

Security Council composition
- Permanent members: China; France; Soviet Union; United Kingdom; United States
- Non-permanent members: Bolivia; Brazil; Czechoslovakia; Ivory Coast; Morocco; Norway

United Nations Security Council Resolution 195 was adopted on October 9, 1964. After examining the application of Malawi for membership in the United Nations, the Council recommended to the General Assembly that Malawi be admitted.

The resolution was adopted unanimously by all members of the council.

== See also ==
- List of United Nations Security Council Resolutions 101 to 200 (1953–1965)
