= United Nations Security Council Resolution 177 =

UN Security Council Resolution 177
- Location of Uganda
- Date: 15 October 1962
- Meeting no.: 1,021
- Code: S/5179 (Document)
- Subject: Admission of new Members to the UN: Uganda
- Voting summary: 11 voted for; None voted against; None abstained
- Result: Adopted

Security Council composition
- Permanent members: China; France; Soviet Union; United Kingdom; United States
- Non-permanent members: Chile; Ghana; Ireland; Romania; United Arab Republic; Venezuela

United Nations Security Council Resolution 177, adopted unanimously on October 15, 1962, after examining the application of Uganda for membership in the United Nations, the Council recommended to the General Assembly that Uganda be admitted.

== See also ==
- List of United Nations Security Council Resolutions 101 to 200 (1953–1965)
