= United Nations Security Council Resolution 141 =

United Nations Security Council resolution

UN Security Council Resolution 141
- Date: July 5 1960
- Meeting no.: 871
- Code: S/4374 (Document)
- Subject: Admission of new Members to the UN: Republic of Somalia
- Voting summary: 11 voted for; None voted against; None abstained
- Result: Adopted

Security Council composition
- Permanent members: China; France; Soviet Union; United Kingdom; United States
- Non-permanent members: Argentina; Ceylon; Ecuador; Italy; Poland; Tunisia

The United Nations Security Council Resolution 141 was adopted unanimously on July 5, 1960, recommending to the General Assembly the admission of the Somali Republic to membership in the United Nations.

== See also ==
- List of United Nations Security Council Resolutions 101 to 200 (1953–1965)
