= United Nations Security Council Resolution 171 =

UN Security Council Resolution 171
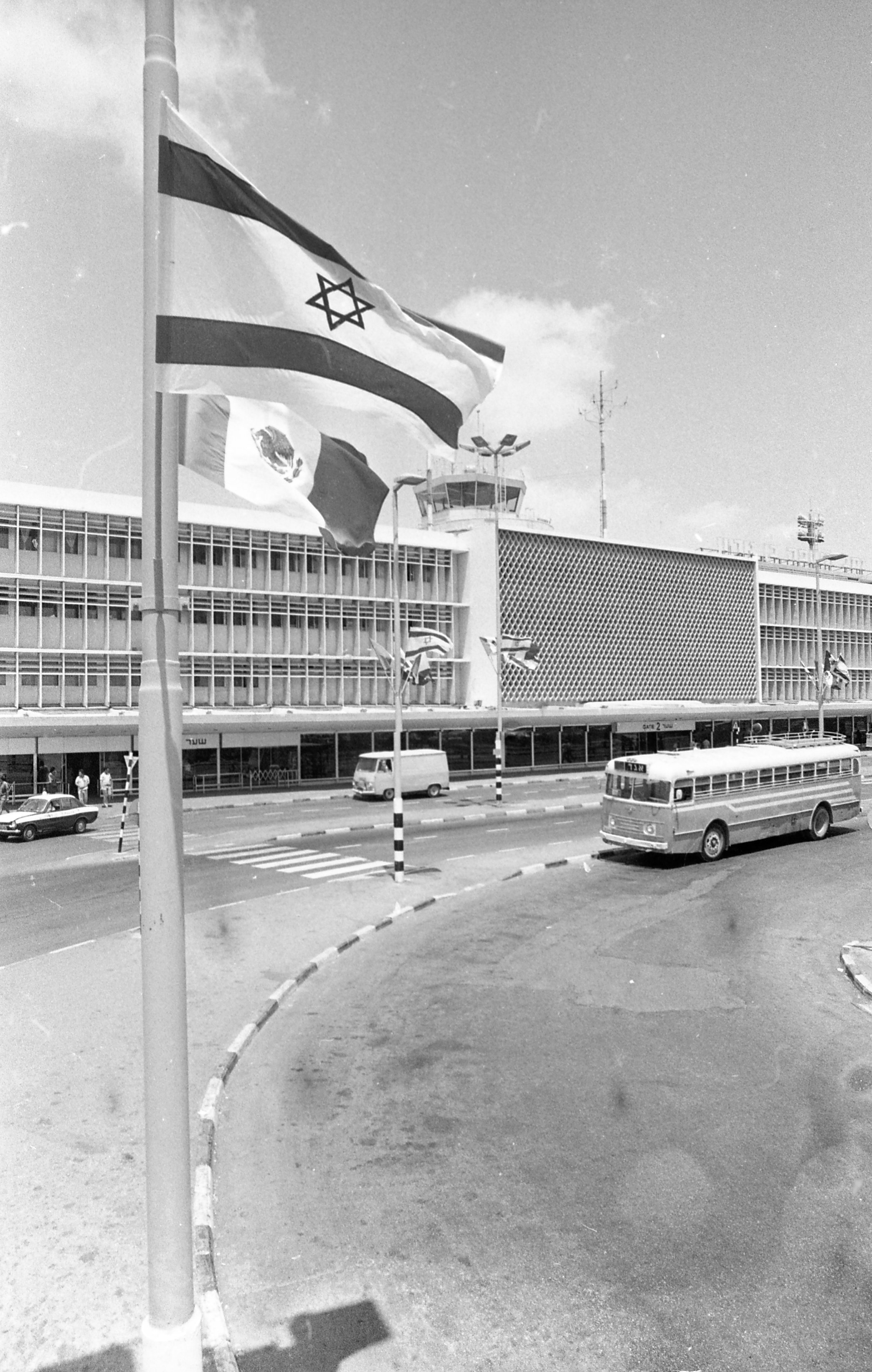
- Israel flag
- Date: April 9 1962
- Meeting no.: 1006
- Code: S/5111 (Document)
- Subject: The Palestine Question
- Voting summary: 10 voted for; None voted against; 1 abstained
- Result: Adopted

Security Council composition
- Permanent members: China; France; Soviet Union; United Kingdom; United States
- Non-permanent members: Chile; Ghana; Ireland; Romania; United Arab Republic; Venezuela

United Nations Security Council Resolution 171 was adopted on April 9, 1962. Following a report by the Chief of Staff of the United Nations Truce Supervision Organization in Palestine (TSO) regarding military activities in the Lake Tiberius area, along with statements by Syrian and Israeli representatives, the Council condemned both parties for their actions and determined that Israel had flagrantly violated UN resolutions.

The Council then called for both parties to live up to their obligations under UN resolutions, the UN Charter and the General Armistice Agreement, and to co-operate with the Chief of Staff. The Council also endorsed the Chief of Staff's recommendation for the strengthening of the TSO.

The resolution was adopted with ten votes; France abstained.

== See also ==
- List of United Nations Security Council Resolutions 101 to 200 (1953–1965)
