= United Nations Security Council Resolution 112 =

UN Security Council Resolution 112
- Date: February 6 1956
- Meeting no.: 716
- Code: S/3546 (Document)
- Subject: Admission of new Members to the UN: Sudan
- Voting summary: 11 voted for; None voted against; None abstained
- Result: Adopted

Security Council composition
- Permanent members: China; France; Soviet Union; United Kingdom; United States
- Non-permanent members: Australia; Belgium; Cuba; Iran; Peru; Yugoslavia

United Nations Security Council Resolution 112, adopted on February 6, 1956, after examining the application of the Sudan for membership in the United Nations the Council recommended to the General Assembly that the Sudan be admitted.

The resolution was passed unanimously.

== See also ==
- List of United Nations Security Council Resolutions 101 to 200 (1953–1965)
