= United Nations Security Council Resolution 194 =

UN Security Council Resolution 194
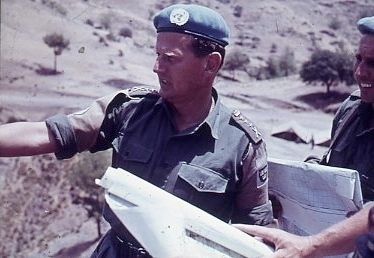
- Peacekeeping in Cyprus
- Date: September 25 1964
- Meeting no.: 1159
- Code: S/5987 (Document)
- Subject: The Cyprus Question
- Voting summary: 11 voted for; None voted against; None abstained
- Result: Adopted

Security Council composition
- Permanent members: China; France; Soviet Union; United Kingdom; United States
- Non-permanent members: Bolivia; Brazil; Czechoslovakia; Ivory Coast; Morocco; Norway

United Nations Security Council Resolution 194, adopted unanimously on September 25, 1964, reaffirmed its previous resolutions on Cyprus and extended the stationing period of the United Nations Peacekeeping Force in Cyprus for another 3 months, now ending December 26, 1964.

== See also ==
- Cyprus dispute
- List of United Nations Security Council Resolutions 101 to 200 (1953–1965)
