= United Nations Security Council Resolution 140 =

United Nations Security Council resolution

UN Security Council Resolution 140
- Date: June 29 1960
- Meeting no.: 870
- Code: S/4359 (Document)
- Subject: Admission of new Members to the UN: Malagasy Republic
- Voting summary: 11 voted for; None voted against; None abstained
- Result: Adopted

Security Council composition
- Permanent members: China; France; Soviet Union; United Kingdom; United States
- Non-permanent members: Argentina; Ceylon; Ecuador; Italy; Poland; Tunisia

United Nations Security Council Resolution 140 concerned admission of the Malagasy Republic (Madagascar) to membership in the United Nations. In the resolution, the Council recommended that the General Assembly approve the Republic's application for membership. The Council adopted Resolution 140 unanimously on June 29, 1960.

== See also ==
- List of United Nations Security Council Resolutions 101 to 200 (1953–1965)
