= United Nations Security Council Resolution 185 =

UN Security Council Resolution 185
- Date: December 16 1963
- Meeting no.: 1084
- Code: S/5487 (Document)
- Subject: Admission of new Members to the UN: Kenya
- Voting summary: 11 voted for; None voted against; None abstained
- Result: Adopted

Security Council composition
- Permanent members: China; France; Soviet Union; United Kingdom; United States
- Non-permanent members: Brazil; Ghana; Morocco; Norway; Philippines; Venezuela

United Nations Security Council Resolution 185 was adopted unanimously on December 16, 1963. After examining the application of Kenya for membership in the United Nations, the Council recommended to the General Assembly that Kenya be admitted.

== See also ==
- List of United Nations Security Council Resolutions 101 to 200 (1953–1965)
