= United Nations Security Council Resolution 154 =

United Nations Security Council resolution

UN Security Council Resolution 154
- Date: August 23 1960
- Meeting no.: 891
- Code: S/4466 (Document)
- Subject: Admission of new Members to the UN: Central African Republic
- Voting summary: 11 voted for; None voted against; None abstained
- Result: Adopted

Security Council composition
- Permanent members: China; France; Soviet Union; United Kingdom; United States
- Non-permanent members: Argentina; Ceylon; Ecuador; Italy; Poland; Tunisia

United Nations Security Council Resolution 154, adopted on August 23, 1960, after examining the application of the Central African Republic for membership in the United Nations, the Council recommended to the General Assembly that the Central African Republic be admitted.

The resolution was adopted unanimously.

== See also ==
- List of United Nations Security Council Resolutions 101 to 200 (1953–1965)
