= United Nations Security Council Resolution 191 =

UN Security Council Resolution 191
- Date: June 18 1964
- Meeting no.: 1135
- Code: S/5773 (Document)
- Subject: Question relating to the policies of apartheid of the Government of the Republic of South Africa
- Voting summary: 8 voted for; None voted against; 3 abstained
- Result: Adopted

Security Council composition
- Permanent members: China; France; Soviet Union; United Kingdom; United States
- Non-permanent members: Bolivia; Brazil; Czechoslovakia; Ivory Coast; Morocco; Norway

United Nations Security Council Resolution 191, adopted on June 18, 1964, after reiterating its previous requests of the Republic of South Africa and again condemning apartheid, the Council decided to establish a Group of Experts made up of representatives of all the then current members of the Council to study the feasibility and effectiveness of measures which could be taken by the Council under the Charter. The Council also invited the Secretary-General to establish education and training programs for South Africans abroad.

The resolution was adopted with eight votes to none; Czechoslovakia, France and the Soviet Union abstained.

== See also ==
- List of United Nations Security Council Resolutions 101 to 200 (1953–1965)
- South Africa under apartheid
