= United Nations Security Council Resolution 137 =

United Nations Security Council resolution

UN Security Council Resolution 137
- Date: May 31 1960
- Meeting no.: 864
- Code: S/4331 (Document)
- Subject: International Court of Justice
- Result: Adopted

Security Council composition
- Permanent members: China; France; Soviet Union; United Kingdom; United States
- Non-permanent members: Argentina; Ceylon; Ecuador; Italy; Poland; Tunisia

United Nations Security Council Resolution 137, adopted on May 31, 1960, noted with regret the death of Judge Sir Hersch Lauterpacht on May 8. The Council then decided that in accordance with the Statute of the Court the resulting vacancy in the International Court of Justice would be resolved by an election in the General Assembly that would take place during the fifteenth session of that body.

The resolution was adopted without vote.

== See also ==
- List of United Nations Security Council Resolutions 101 to 200 (1953–1965)
