= United Nations Security Council Resolution 110 =

UN Security Council Resolution 110
- Date: December 16 1955
- Meeting no.: 707
- Code: S/3504 (Document)
- Subject: Question of reviewing the Charter of the UN
- Voting summary: 9 voted for; 1 voted against; 1 abstained
- Result: Adopted

Security Council composition
- Permanent members: China; France; Soviet Union; United Kingdom; United States
- Non-permanent members: Belgium; Brazil; Iran; New Zealand; Peru; Turkey

United Nations Security Council Resolution 110, adopted on December 16, 1955, stated that in light of an article in the United Nations Charter provided that if a General Conference of the Members of the United Nations for the purpose of reviewing the Charter had not been held before the tenth annual session of the General Assembly such a conference would be held if so decided by a majority vote of the General Assembly and by any seven members of the Security Council. Having considered United Nations General Assembly Resolution 992 it was decided that a conference to review the Charter should be held.

The resolution was approved by nine votes in favour. The Soviet Union voted against the text and France abstained.

== See also ==
- Article 109 of the UN Charter
- List of United Nations Security Council Resolutions 101 to 200 (1953–1965)
