= United Nations Security Council Resolution 105 =

UN Security Council Resolution 105
- Date: July 28 1954
- Meeting no.: 677
- Code: S/3274 (Document)
- Subject: International Court of Justice
- Result: Adopted

Security Council composition
- Permanent members: China; France; Soviet Union; United Kingdom; United States
- Non-permanent members: Brazil; Colombia; Denmark; Lebanon; New Zealand; Turkey

United Nations Security Council Resolution 105, adopted on July 28, 1954, after noting with regret the death of Judge Sir Benegal Narsing Rau, a Judge on the International Court of Justice, the Council decided that the election to fill the vacancy would take place during the ninth session of the General Assembly, and that that election would take place after the regular election to be held at the same session to fill the five vacancies which would come up on February 5, 1955.

The resolution was adopted without vote.

== See also ==
- List of United Nations Security Council Resolutions 101 to 200 (1953–1965)
