= United Nations Security Council Resolution 103 =

UN Security Council Resolution 103
- Date: 3 December 1953
- Meeting no.: 645
- Subject: San Marino, International Court of Justice
- Voting summary: 10 voted for; None voted against; 1 abstained
- Result: Adopted

Security Council composition
- Permanent members: China; France; Soviet Union; United Kingdom; United States
- Non-permanent members: Chile; Colombia; Denmark; Greece; Lebanon; Pakistan

United Nations Security Council Resolution 103 was adopted on 3 December 1953. In it, the Security Council recommended to the General Assembly that San Marino be allowed to become a party to the Statute of the International Court of Justice if the following conditions were met:

1. acceptance of the provisions of the Statute of the ICJ,
2. acceptance of all the obligations of a Member of the United Nations under Article 94 of the Charter, and
3. undertaking to contribute to the expenses of the Court as the General Assembly shall assess from time to time, after consultation with the San Marinese Government.

The resolution was adopted with ten votes, while the Soviet Union abstained.

== See also ==
- List of United Nations Security Council Resolutions 101 to 200 (1953–1965)
