= United Nations Security Council Resolution 120 =

UN Security Council Resolution 120
- Date: November 4 1956
- Meeting no.: 754
- Code: S/3733 (Document)
- Subject: The situation in Hungary
- Voting summary: 10 voted for; 1 voted against; None abstained
- Result: Adopted

Security Council composition
- Permanent members: China; France; Soviet Union; United Kingdom; United States
- Non-permanent members: Australia; Belgium; Cuba; Iran; Peru; Yugoslavia

United Nations Security Council Resolution 120, adopted on November 4, 1956, considering the grave situation created by the Union of Soviet Socialist Republics in the suppression of the Hungarian people in asserting their rights of protest, and the lack of unanimity of its permanent members, the Council felt it had been prevented from exercising its responsibility for the maintenance of international peace and security. As a solution, the Council decided to call an emergency special session of the General Assembly in order to make appropriate recommendations.

The resolution was adopted with 10 votes in favour to one against, from the Soviet Union.

== See also ==
- List of United Nations Security Council Resolutions 101 to 200 (1953–1965)
- The Hungarian Revolution of 1956

== Bibliography ==
- Text of the Resolution at undocs.org
