= United Nations Security Council Resolution 131 =

UN Security Council Resolution 131
- Date: December 9 1958
- Meeting no.: 842
- Code: S/4133 (Document)
- Subject: Admission of new Members to the UN: Guinea
- Voting summary: 10 voted for; None voted against; 1 abstained
- Result: Adopted

Security Council composition
- Permanent members: China; France; Soviet Union; United Kingdom; United States
- Non-permanent members: Canada; Colombia; Iraq; Japan; Panama; Sweden

United Nations Security Council Resolution 131, adopted on December 9, 1958, after examining the application of the Republic of Guinea for membership in the United Nations the Council recommended to the General Assembly that the Republic of Guinea be admitted.

The resolution was adopted by ten votes with France abstaining.

== See also ==
- List of United Nations Security Council Resolutions 101 to 200 (1953–1965)
