= United Nations Security Council Resolution 125 =

UN Security Council Resolution 125
- Date: September 5 1957
- Meeting no.: 786
- Code: S/3882 (Document)
- Subject: Admission of new Members to the UN: Malaya
- Voting summary: 11 voted for; None voted against; None abstained
- Result: Adopted

Security Council composition
- Permanent members: China; France; Soviet Union; United Kingdom; United States
- Non-permanent members: Australia; Colombia; Cuba; Iraq; Philippines; Sweden

United Nations Security Council Resolution 125 was adopted on September 5, 1957. After examining the application of the Federation of Malaya (now Malaysia) for membership in the United Nations, the Council unanimously recommended to the General Assembly that the Federation of Malaya be admitted.

The resolution was adopted unanimously by all 11 members of the Council.

== See also ==
- List of United Nations Security Council Resolutions 101 to 200 (1953–1965)
