= United Nations Security Council Resolution 193 =

UN Security Council Resolution 193
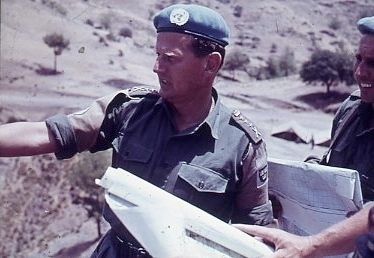
- Peacekeeping in Cyprus
- Date: August 9 1964
- Meeting no.: 1143
- Code: S/5868 (Document)
- Subject: The Cyprus Question
- Voting summary: 9 voted for; None voted against; 2 abstained
- Result: Adopted

Security Council composition
- Permanent members: China; France; Soviet Union; United Kingdom; United States
- Non-permanent members: Bolivia; Brazil; Czechoslovakia; Ivory Coast; Morocco; Norway

United Nations Security Council Resolution 193 was adopted on August 9, 1964. After a serious deterioration of the situation in Cyprus, the Council reaffirmed an appeal to Turkey, to cease bombarding the island, and to Cyprus, ordering all her armed forces to cease firing. The Council called upon all to co-operate fully with the Commander of the United Nations Peacekeeping Force in Cyprus and to refrain from any action that might exacerbate or broaden the hostilities.

Resolution 193 was adopted nine votes to none, with two abstentions from Czechoslovakia and the Soviet Union.

== See also ==
- Cyprus dispute
- List of United Nations Security Council Resolutions 101 to 200 (1953–1965)
