= United Nations Security Council Resolution 183 =

United Nations Security Council resolution

UN Security Council Resolution 183
- Date: December 11 1963
- Meeting no.: 1083
- Code: S/5481 (Document)
- Subject: Question relating to Territories under Portuguese administration
- Voting summary: 10 voted for; None voted against; 1 abstained
- Result: Adopted

Security Council composition
- Permanent members: China; France; Soviet Union; United Kingdom; United States
- Non-permanent members: Brazil; Ghana; Morocco; Norway; Philippines; Venezuela

United Nations Security Council Resolution 183, adopted on December 11, 1963, after the Secretary-General established a failed meeting between representatives of Portugal and those of African States, the Council again deprecated Portugal's failure to free its colonies though they said they would take Portugal's granting amnesty to all political prisoners as a sign of good faith.

The resolution was adopted with 10 votes and one abstention from France.

== See also ==
- List of United Nations Security Council Resolutions 101 to 200 (1953–1965)
- Portuguese Empire
- Portuguese Colonial War
