= United Nations Security Council Resolution 104 =

UN Security Council Resolution 104
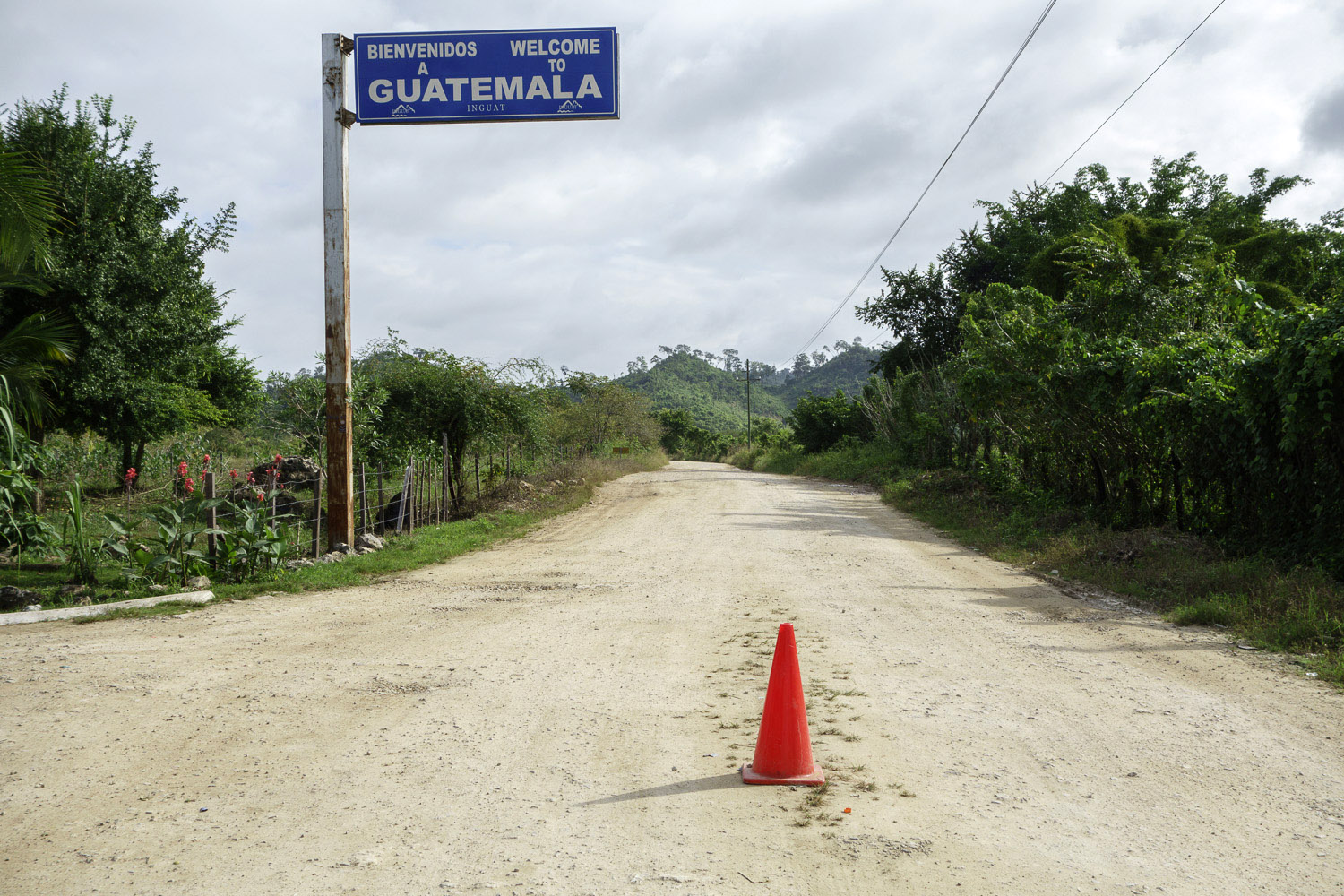
- Guatemala-México border
- Date: June 20 1954
- Meeting no.: 675
- Code: S/3237 (Document)
- Subject: Question submitted by Guatemala
- Voting summary: 11 voted for; None voted against; None abstained
- Result: Adopted

Security Council composition
- Permanent members: China; France; Soviet Union; United Kingdom; United States
- Non-permanent members: Brazil; Colombia; Denmark; Lebanon; New Zealand; Turkey

United Nations Security Council Resolution 104, adopted unanimously on June 20, 1954, after receiving a communication from the Government of Guatemala to the President of the Security Council, the Council called for the immediate termination of any action likely to cause bloodshed and requested all Member of the United Nations to abstain, in the spirit of the Charter, from rendering assistance to any such action.

== See also ==
- 1954 Guatemalan coup d'état
- List of United Nations Security Council Resolutions 101 to 200 (1953–1965)
