= United Nations Security Council Resolution 142 =

United Nations Security Council resolution

UN Security Council Resolution 142
- Date: July 7 1960
- Meeting no.: 872
- Code: S/4377 (Document)
- Subject: Admission of new Members to the UN: Republic of Congo
- Voting summary: 11 voted for; None voted against; None abstained
- Result: Adopted

Security Council composition
- Permanent members: China; France; Soviet Union; United Kingdom; United States
- Non-permanent members: Argentina; Ceylon; Ecuador; Italy; Poland; Tunisia

United Nations Security Council Resolution 142, adopted unanimously on July 7, 1960, after examining the application of the Republic of the Congo (Léopoldville) for membership in the United Nations, the Council recommended to the General Assembly that the Republic of the Congo be admitted.

== See also ==
- List of United Nations Security Council Resolutions 101 to 200 (1953–1965)
