= United Nations Security Council Resolution 116 =

UN Security Council Resolution 116
- Date: June 26 1956
- Meeting no.: 732
- Code: S/3629 (Document)
- Subject: Admission of new Members to the UN: Tunisia
- Voting summary: 11 voted for; None voted against; None abstained
- Result: Adopted

Security Council composition
- Permanent members: China; France; Soviet Union; United Kingdom; United States
- Non-permanent members: Australia; Belgium; Cuba; Iran; Peru; Yugoslavia

United Nations Security Council Resolution 116, adopted on June 26, 1956, after examining the application of Tunisia for membership in the United Nations the Council recommended to the General Assembly that the Tunisia be admitted.

The resolution was approved by all 11 members of the Council.

== See also ==
- List of United Nations Security Council Resolutions 101 to 200 (1953–1965)
