= United Nations Security Council Resolution 135 =

United Nations Security Council resolution

UN Security Council Resolution 135
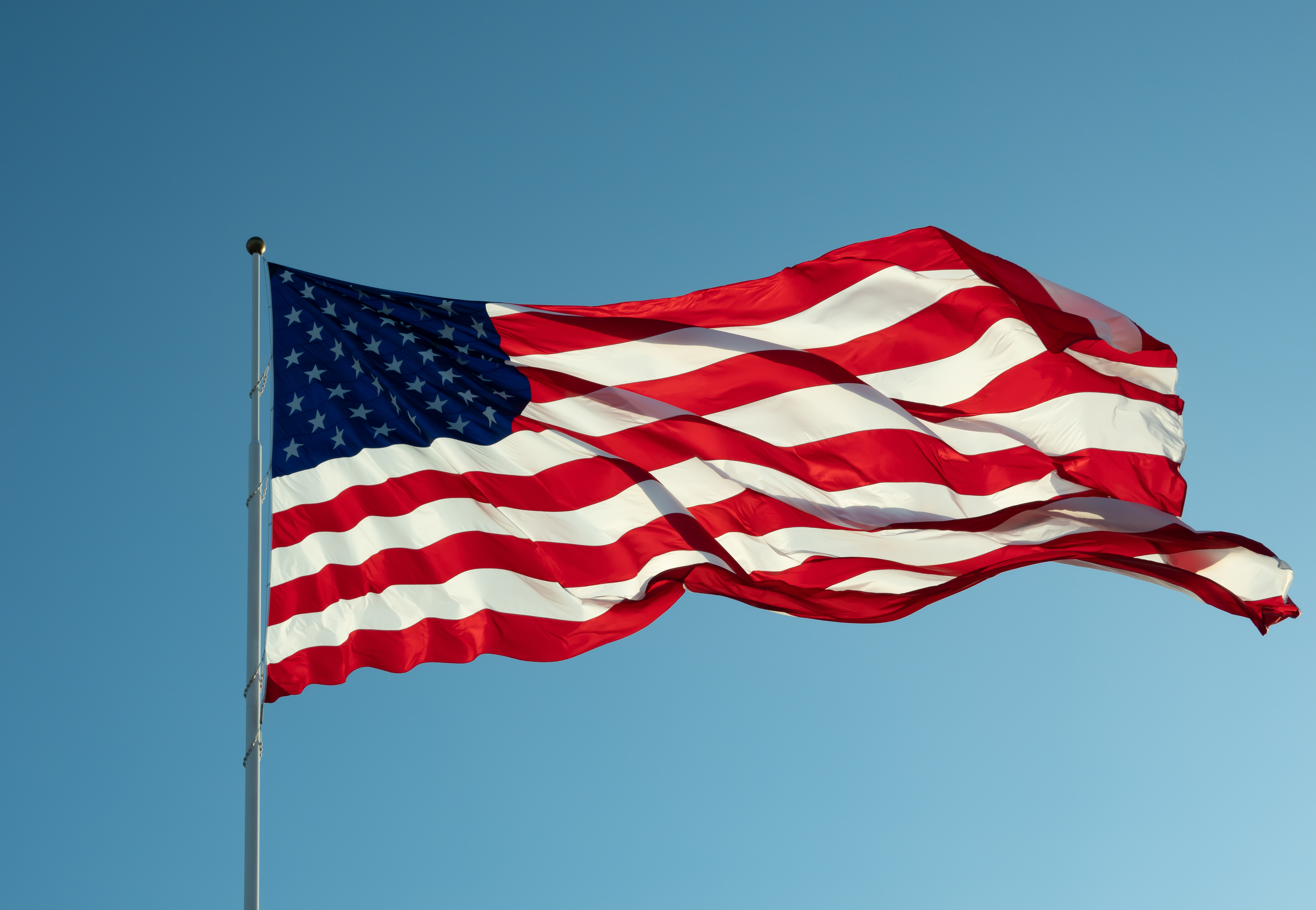
- USA flag
- Date: May 27 1960
- Meeting no.: 863
- Code: S/4328 (Document)
- Subject: Question of relations between Great Powers
- Voting summary: 9 voted for; None voted against; 2 abstained
- Result: Adopted

Security Council composition
- Permanent members: China; France; Soviet Union; United Kingdom; United States
- Non-permanent members: Argentina; Ceylon; Ecuador; Italy; Poland; Tunisia

United Nations Security Council Resolution 135, adopted on May 27, 1960, after a failed meeting between the Heads of State of France, the Union of Soviet Socialist Republics, the United Kingdom and the United States, the Council recommended those governments seek solutions of existing international problems by negotiation or other peaceful means as provided in the Charter of the United Nations. The resolution pleaded with them to refrain from the use of threats of force, to seek disarmament in accordance with United Nations General Assembly Resolution 1378, to discontinue all nuclear weapons tests and to avail themselves to the assistance of the council and any other appropriate UN organs to render these ends.

Resolution 135 was adopted by nine votes to none; the People's Republic of Poland and Soviet Union abstained.

== See also ==
- List of United Nations Security Council Resolutions 101 to 200 (1953–1965)
