= United Nations Security Council Resolution 189 =

UN Security Council Resolution 189
- Date: June 4 1964
- Meeting no.: 1126
- Code: S/5741 (Document)
- Subject: Complaint concerning acts of aggression against the territory and civilian population of Cambodia
- Voting summary: 11 voted for; None voted against; None abstained
- Result: Adopted

Security Council composition
- Permanent members: China; France; Soviet Union; United Kingdom; United States
- Non-permanent members: Bolivia; Brazil; Czechoslovakia; Ivory Coast; Morocco; Norway

United Nations Security Council Resolution 189, adopted unanimously on June 4, 1964, deplored an incident caused by the penetration of units of the Republic of Vietnam into Cambodia and requested compensation for the Cambodians. The resolution then requested that all States and authorities recognize and respect Cambodia's neutrality and territorial integrity, deciding to send 3 of its members to the places the most recent incidents had occurred to report back to the Council in 45 days with suggestions.

Cambodia had previously complained of acts of aggression and intrusions by South Vietnamese and American troops into its territory. On July 24, 1964, the mission sent by the Council reported that the situation at the frontier remained tense and a solution had yet to be found.

== See also ==
- List of United Nations Security Council Resolutions 101 to 200 (1953–1965)
- Vietnam War
