= United Nations Security Council Resolution 172 =

UN Security Council Resolution 172
- Date: July 26 1962
- Meeting no.: 1017
- Code: S/5149 (Document)
- Subject: Admission of new Members to the UN: Republic of Rwanda
- Voting summary: 11 voted for; None voted against; None abstained
- Result: Adopted

Security Council composition
- Permanent members: China; France; Soviet Union; United Kingdom; United States
- Non-permanent members: Chile; Ghana; Ireland; Romania; United Arab Republic; Venezuela

United Nations Security Council Resolution 172, adopted unanimously on July 26, 1962, after examining the application of the Republic of Rwanda for membership in the United Nations, the Council recommended to the General Assembly that the Republic of Rwanda be admitted.

== See also ==
- List of United Nations Security Council Resolutions 101 to 200 (1953–1965)
