= United Nations Security Council Resolution 144 =

United Nations Security Council resolution

UN Security Council Resolution 144
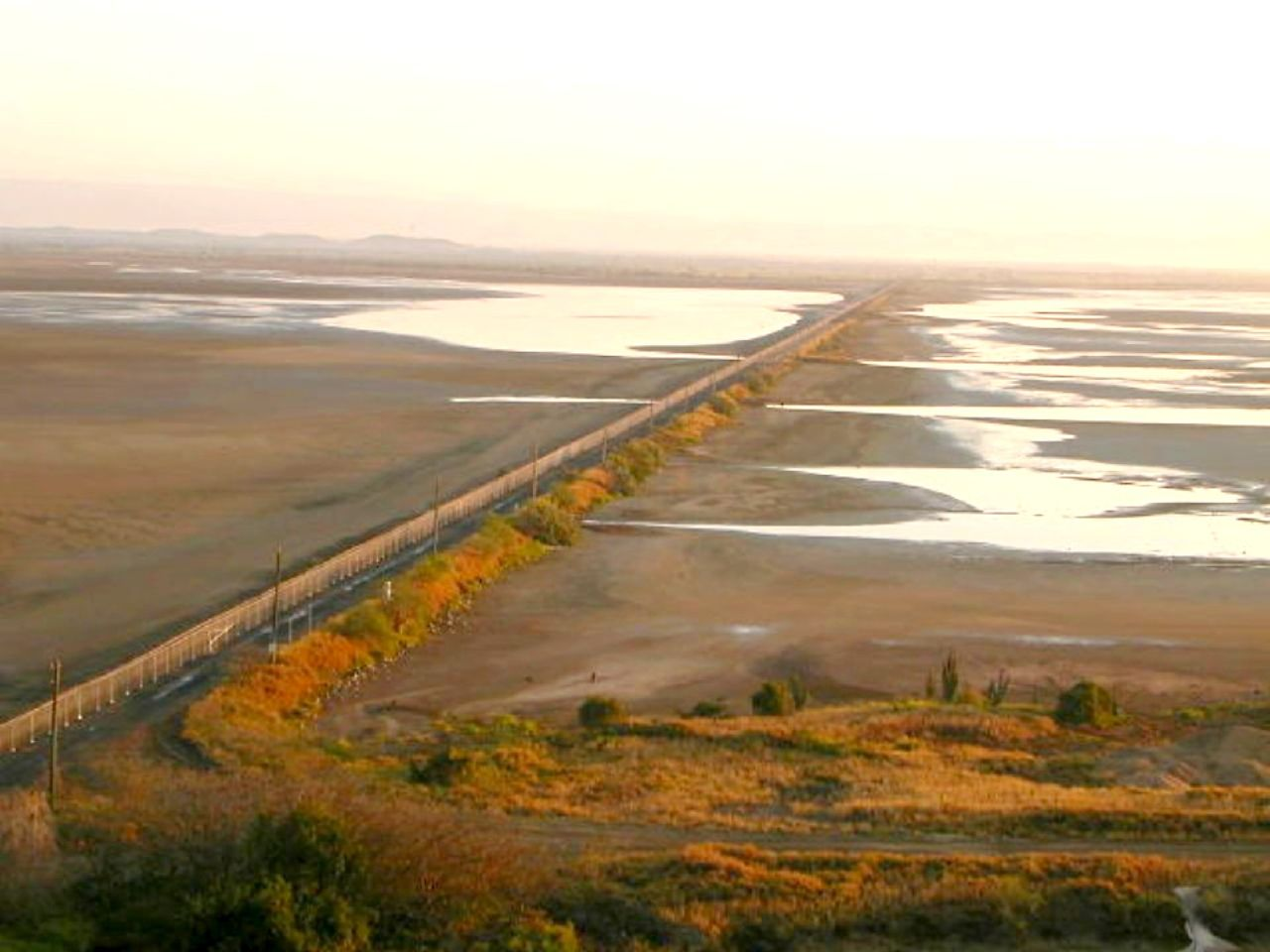
- Guantanamo Bay Naval Base border
- Date: July 19 1960
- Meeting no.: 876
- Code: S/4395 (Document)
- Subject: Complaint by Cuba (July 1960)
- Voting summary: 9 voted for; None voted against; 2 abstained
- Result: Adopted

Security Council composition
- Permanent members: China; France; Soviet Union; United Kingdom; United States
- Non-permanent members: Argentina; Ceylon; Ecuador; Italy; Poland; Tunisia

United Nations Security Council Resolution 144, adopted on July 19, 1960, acknowledging that the situation existing between Cuba and the United States was growing more tense but also that it was the subject of ongoing debate inside the Organization of American States, the council decided to delay action on the matter until receiving a report from the OAS. The council urged all other States to refrain from any action which might increase the existing tensions between the two nations.

Resolution 144 was adopted by nine votes to none, while the People's Republic of Poland and Soviet Union abstained.

== See also ==
- List of United Nations Security Council Resolutions 101 to 200 (1953–1965)
