= United Nations Security Council Resolution 198 =

UN Security Council Resolution 198
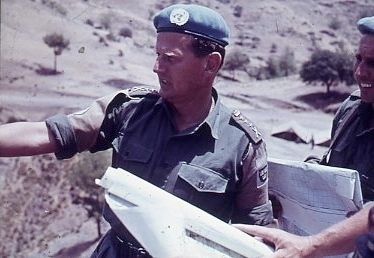
- Peacekeeping in Cyprus
- Date: December 18 1964
- Meeting no.: 1180
- Code: S/6121 (Document)
- Subject: The Cyprus Question
- Voting summary: 11 voted for; None voted against; None abstained
- Result: Adopted

Security Council composition
- Permanent members: China; France; Soviet Union; United Kingdom; United States
- Non-permanent members: Bolivia; Brazil; Czechoslovakia; Ivory Coast; Morocco; Norway

United Nations Security Council Resolution 198, adopted on December 18, 1964, after reaffirming previous resolutions on the topic of Cyprus, the Council extended the stationing of the United Nations Peacekeeping Force in Cyprus for an additional 3 months, to end on March 26, 1965.

== See also ==
- Cyprus dispute
- List of United Nations Security Council Resolutions 101 to 200 (1953–1965)
