= United Nations Security Council Resolution 127 =

UN Security Council Resolution 127
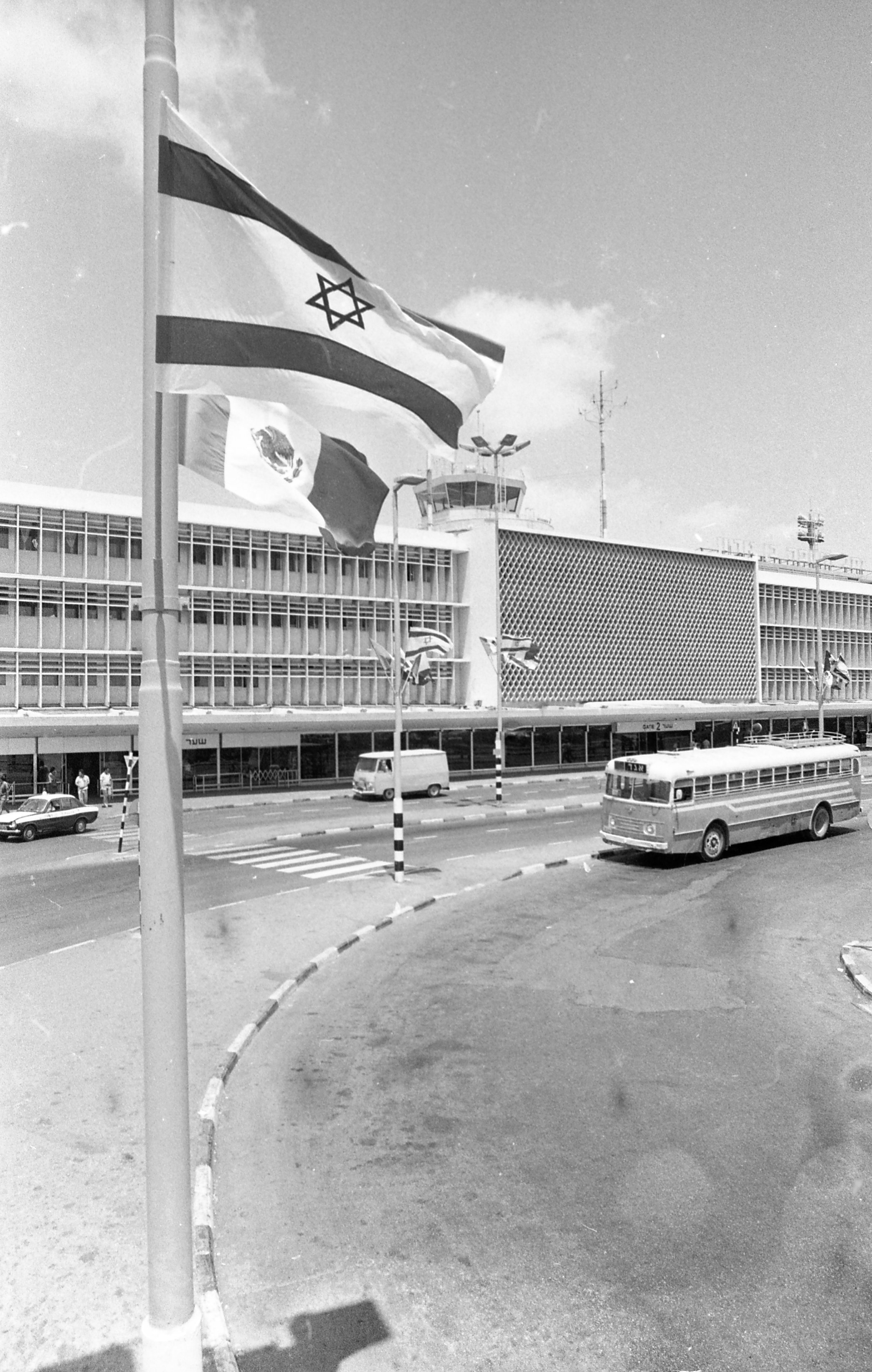
- Israel flag
- Date: January 22 1958
- Meeting no.: 810
- Code: S/3942 (Document)
- Subject: The Palestine Question
- Voting summary: 11 voted for; None voted against; None abstained
- Result: Adopted

Security Council composition
- Permanent members: China; France; Soviet Union; United Kingdom; United States
- Non-permanent members: Canada; Colombia; Iraq; Japan; Panama; Sweden

United Nations Security Council Resolution 127, adopted on January 22, 1958, dealt with complaints by Jordan regarding Israeli activities between the armistice demarcation lines. Taking into account a report by the Acting Chief of Staff of the United Nations Truce Supervision Organization in Palestine, the Council noted that neither Israel or Jordan enjoyed sovereignty over any part of the zone. The Council then directed the Chief of Staff to regulate activities within the zone so that Israelis would not be allowed to use Arab-owned properties and vice versa, and directed the Chief of Staff to conduct a survey of property records with a view to determine property ownership in the zone.

The resolution then endorsed the recommendation that parties should discuss, through the Mixed Armistice Commissions, civilian activities in the zone and that until an agreement could be reached such activities in the zone should be suspended. The Council then called upon all parties to abide by the General Armistice Agreement and for the Chief of Staff for report to the Council on the implementation of the present resolution.

The resolution was approved by all members of the Council.

== See also ==
- Arab–Israeli conflict
- List of United Nations Security Council Resolutions 101 to 200 (1953–1965)
