= United Nations Security Council Resolution 181 =

UN Security Council Resolution 181
- Date: August 7 1963
- Meeting no.: 1056
- Code: S/5386 (Document)
- Subject: Question relating to the policies of apartheid of the Government of the Republic of South Africa
- Voting summary: 9 voted for; None voted against; 2 abstained
- Result: Adopted

Security Council composition
- Permanent members: China; France; Soviet Union; United Kingdom; United States
- Non-permanent members: Brazil; Ghana; Morocco; Norway; Philippines; Venezuela

United Nations Security Council Resolution 181, adopted on August 7, 1963, was concerned with an arms build-up by the Republic of South Africa and fears that those arms might be used to further the racial conflict in that country. The Council called upon the government of South Africa to abandon its policy of apartheid, as first requested to by Resolution 134 (1960), and called upon all states to voluntarily cease the sale and shipment of all arms, ammunition and other military equipment to South Africa.

The resolution was adopted by nine votes to none; France and the United Kingdom abstained. However, the resolution had little immediate effect on the conduct of the regime in South Africa.

In 1977, the voluntary arms embargo on South Africa was made mandatory.

== See also ==
- List of United Nations Security Council Resolutions 101 to 200 (1953–1965)
- International sanctions during apartheid
