= United Nations Security Council Resolution 176 =

UN Security Council Resolution 176
- Date: October 4 1962
- Meeting no.: 1020
- Code: S/5174 (Document)
- Subject: Admission of new Members to the UN: Algeria
- Voting summary: 10 voted for; None voted against; 1 abstained
- Result: Adopted

Security Council composition
- Permanent members: China; France; Soviet Union; United Kingdom; United States
- Non-permanent members: Chile; Ghana; Ireland; Romania; United Arab Republic; Venezuela

United Nations Security Council Resolution 176, adopted on October 4, 1962, after examining the application of the Democratic and Popular Republic of Algeria for membership in the United Nations the Council recommended to the General Assembly that the Democratic and Popular Republic of Algeria be admitted.

The resolution passed with ten votes to none, while the Republic of China abstained.

== See also ==
- List of United Nations Security Council Resolutions 101 to 200 (1953–1965)
