= United Nations Security Council Resolution 147 =

United Nations Security Council resolution

UN Security Council Resolution 147
- Date: August 23 1960
- Meeting no.: 891
- Code: S/4459 (Document)
- Subject: Admission of new Members to the UN: Benin
- Voting summary: 11 voted for; None voted against; None abstained
- Result: Adopted

Security Council composition
- Permanent members: China; France; Soviet Union; United Kingdom; United States
- Non-permanent members: Argentina; Ceylon; Ecuador; Italy; Poland; Tunisia

United Nations Security Council Resolution 147, adopted unanimously on August 23, 1960, after examining the application of the Republic of Dahomey (now known as Benin) for membership in the United Nations, the Council recommended to the General Assembly that the Republic of Dahomey be admitted.

== See also ==
- List of United Nations Security Council Resolutions 101 to 200 (1953–1965)
