= United Nations Security Council Resolution 199 =

United Nations Security Council resolution

UN Security Council Resolution 199
- Date: December 30 1964
- Meeting no.: 1189
- Code: S/6129 (Document)
- Subject: Question concerning the Democratic Republic of Congo
- Voting summary: 10 voted for; None voted against; 1 abstained
- Result: Adopted

Security Council composition
- Permanent members: China; France; Soviet Union; United Kingdom; United States
- Non-permanent members: Bolivia; Brazil; Czechoslovakia; Ivory Coast; Morocco; Norway

United Nations Security Council Resolution 199, adopted on December 30, 1964, requested that all States refrain (or in some cases cease) from intervening in the domestic affairs of the Congo and appealed for a cease-fire there. After applauding the Organization of African Unity the Council called on States to assist it in achieving its objectives in the Democratic Republic of the Congo.

On December 9, 1964, the DR Congo requested a Security Council meeting to discuss interventions in its internal affairs by many countries. Prior to the resolution being passed, a number of African states were invited to discuss the matter. Resolution 199 passed with ten votes, while France abstained from the vote.

== See also ==
- List of United Nations Security Council Resolutions 101 to 200 (1953–1965)
- The Congo Crisis
