= United Nations Security Council Resolution 108 =

UN Security Council Resolution 108
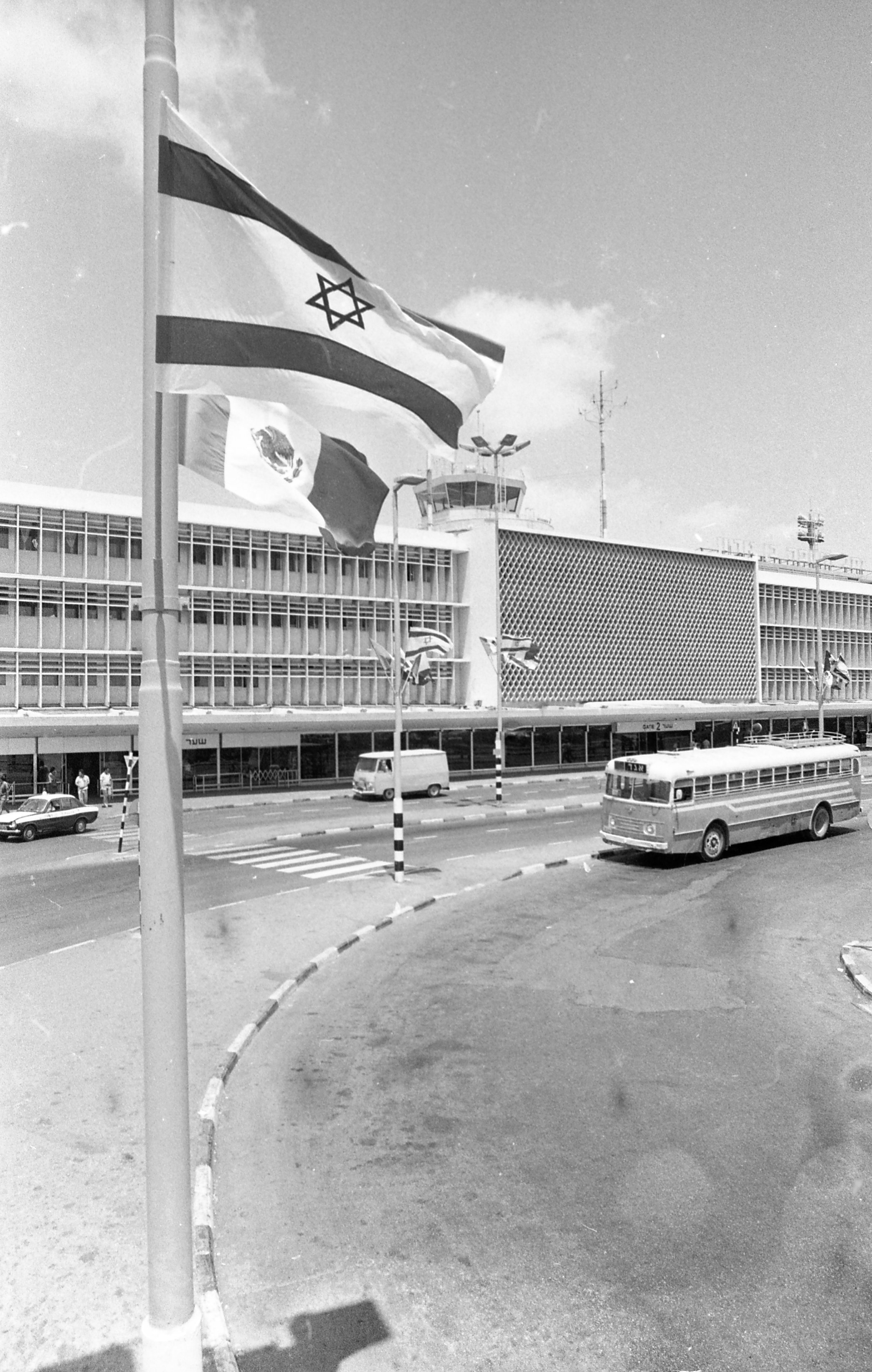
- Israel flag
- Date: September 8 1955
- Meeting no.: 700
- Code: S/3435 (Document)
- Subject: The Palestine Question
- Voting summary: 11 voted for; None voted against; None abstained
- Result: Adopted

Security Council composition
- Permanent members: China; France; Soviet Union; United Kingdom; United States
- Non-permanent members: Belgium; Brazil; Iran; New Zealand; Peru; Turkey

United Nations Security Council Resolution 108, adopted unanimously on September 8, 1955, after another report by the Chief of Staff of the United Nations Truce Supervision Organization in Palestine, the Council noted the acceptance by both parties of the appeal of the Chief of Staff for an unconditional ceasefire. The Council went on to endorse the view of the Chief of Staff that the armed forces of both parties should be clearly and effectively separated by the measures he proposed and declared that freedom of movement must be afforded to UN observers in the area.

== See also ==
- Auja al-Hafir
- List of United Nations Security Council Resolutions 101 to 200 (1953–1965)
- United Nations Security Council Resolution 107
