= United Nations Security Council Resolution 174 =

UN Security Council Resolution 174
- Date: September 12 1962
- Meeting no.: 1018
- Code: S/5166 (Document)
- Subject: Admission of new Members to the UN: Jamaica
- Voting summary: 11 voted for; None voted against; None abstained
- Result: Adopted

Security Council composition
- Permanent members: China; France; Soviet Union; United Kingdom; United States
- Non-permanent members: Chile; Ghana; Ireland; Romania; United Arab Republic; Venezuela

United Nations Security Council Resolution 174, adopted unanimously on September 12, 1962, after examining the application of Jamaica for membership in the United Nations, the Council recommended to the General Assembly that Jamaica be admitted.

== See also ==
- List of United Nations Security Council Resolutions 101 to 200 (1953–1965)
