= United Nations Security Council Resolution 196 =

UN Security Council Resolution 196
- Date: October 30 1964
- Meeting no.: 1161
- Code: S/6032 (Document)
- Subject: Admission of new Members to the UN: Malta
- Voting summary: 11 voted for; None voted against; None abstained
- Result: Adopted

Security Council composition
- Permanent members: China; France; Soviet Union; United Kingdom; United States
- Non-permanent members: Bolivia; Brazil; Czechoslovakia; Ivory Coast; Morocco; Norway

United Nations Security Council Resolution 196, adopted unanimously on October 30, 1964, after examining the application of Malta for membership in the United Nations, the Council recommended to the General Assembly that Malta be admitted.

== See also ==
- List of United Nations Security Council Resolutions 101 to 200 (1953–1965)
