= United Nations Security Council Resolution 133 =

United Nations Security Council resolution

UN Security Council Resolution 133
- Date: January 26 1960
- Meeting no.: 850
- Code: S/4258 and Add.1 (Document)
- Subject: Admission of new Members to the UN: Cameroon
- Voting summary: 11 voted for; None voted against; None abstained
- Result: Adopted

Security Council composition
- Permanent members: China; France; Soviet Union; United Kingdom; United States
- Non-permanent members: Argentina; Ceylon; Ecuador; Italy; Poland; Tunisia

United Nations Security Council Resolution 133, adopted unanimously on January 26, 1960, after examining the application of the Republic of Cameroon for membership in the United Nations, the Council recommended to the General Assembly that the Republic of Cameroon be admitted.

== See also ==
- List of United Nations Security Council Resolutions 101 to 200 (1953–1965)
