= United Nations Security Council Resolution 124 =

UN Security Council Resolution 124
- Date: March 7 1957
- Meeting no.: 775
- Code: S/3801 (Document)
- Subject: Admission of new Members to the UN: Ghana
- Voting summary: 11 voted for; None voted against; None abstained
- Result: Adopted

Security Council composition
- Permanent members: China; France; Soviet Union; United Kingdom; United States
- Non-permanent members: Australia; Colombia; Cuba; Iraq; Philippines; Sweden

United Nations Security Council Resolution 124 was adopted on March 7, 1957. After examining the application of Ghana for membership of the United Nations, the Council unanimously recommended to the General Assembly that Ghana be admitted.

Resolution 124 was adopted unanimously by all 11 members of the council.

== See also ==
- List of United Nations Security Council Resolutions 101 to 200 (1953–1965)
