= United Nations Security Council Resolution 190 =

UN Security Council Resolution 190
- Date: June 9 1964
- Meeting no.: 1128
- Code: S/5761 (Document)
- Subject: Question relating to the policies of apartheid of the Government of the Republic of South Africa
- Voting summary: 7 voted for; None voted against; 4 abstained
- Result: Adopted

Security Council composition
- Permanent members: China; France; Soviet Union; United Kingdom; United States
- Non-permanent members: Bolivia; Brazil; Czechoslovakia; Ivory Coast; Morocco; Norway

United Nations Security Council Resolution 190, adopted on June 9, 1964, after reiterating its previous requests of the Republic of South Africa, the Council noted with great concern the Rivonia Trial and urged the government to release all persons convicted or being tried for their opposition to apartheid. The Council also invited all states to exert all their influence in order to induce the Government of South Africa to comply and asked the Secretary-General to closely follow the implementation of the present resolution to report on it to the Security Council at the earliest possible date.

The resolution was adopted by seven votes to none, with four abstentions from Brazil, France, the United Kingdom and United States.

== See also ==
- List of United Nations Security Council Resolutions 101 to 200 (1953–1965)
- South Africa under apartheid
