= United Nations Security Council Resolution 155 =

United Nations Security Council resolution

UN Security Council Resolution 155
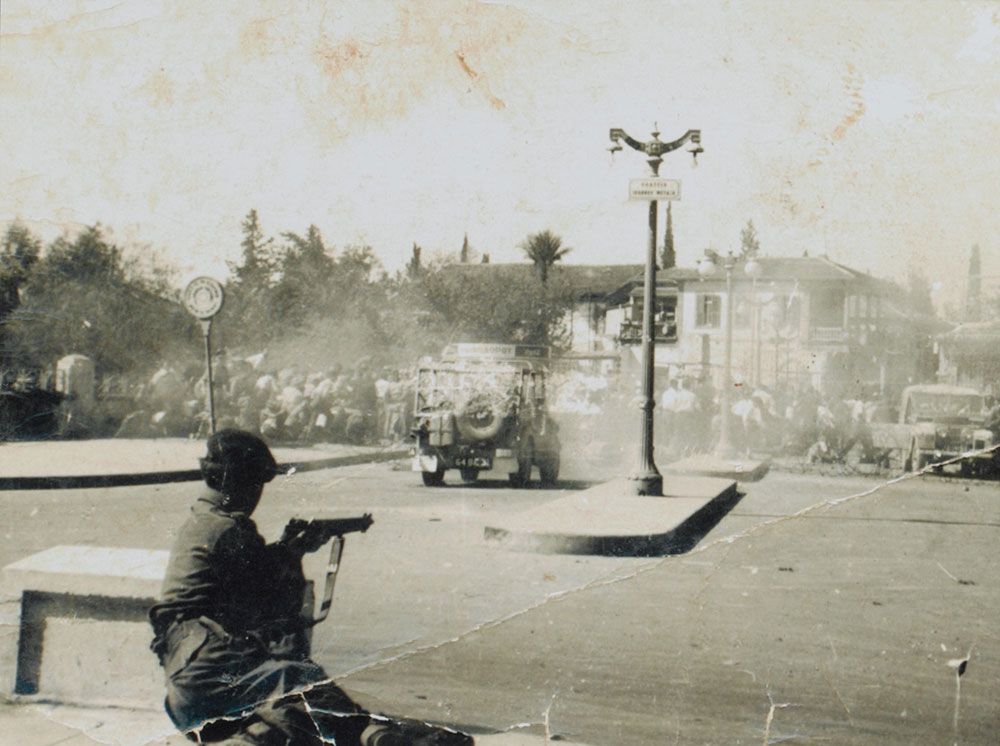
- Cypriot war of independence
- Date: 24 August 1960
- Meeting no.: 892
- Code: S/4469 (Document)
- Subject: Admission of new Members to the UN: Cyprus
- Voting summary: 11 voted for; None voted against; None abstained
- Result: Adopted

Security Council composition
- Permanent members: China; France; Soviet Union; United Kingdom; United States
- Non-permanent members: Argentina; Ceylon; Ecuador; Italy; Poland; Tunisia

United Nations Security Council Resolution 155, adopted on 24 August 1960, after examining the application of the Republic of Cyprus for membership in the United Nations, the Council recommended to the General Assembly that the Republic of Cyprus be admitted.

The resolution was adopted unanimously.

== See also ==
- List of United Nations Security Council Resolutions 101 to 200 (1953–1965)
