= United Nations Security Council Resolution 200 =

UN Security Council Resolution 200
- Date: March 15 1965
- Meeting no.: 1190
- Subject: Admission of new Members to the UN: Gambia
- Voting summary: 11 voted for; None voted against; None abstained
- Result: Adopted

Security Council composition
- Permanent members: China; France; Soviet Union; United Kingdom; United States
- Non-permanent members: Bolivia; Ivory Coast; Jordan; Malaysia; Netherlands; Uruguay

United Nations Security Council Resolution 200 was adopted unanimously on March 15, 1965. After examining the application of the Gambia for membership in the United Nations, the Council recommended to the General Assembly that the Gambia be admitted.

== See also ==
- List of United Nations Security Council Resolutions 101 to 200 (1953–1965)
- List of United Nations Security Council Resolutions 201 to 300 (1965–1971)
