= United Nations Security Council Resolution 149 =

United Nations Security Council resolution

UN Security Council Resolution 149
- Date: August 23 1960
- Meeting no.: 891
- Code: S/4461 (Document)
- Subject: Admission of new Members to the UN: Burkina Faso
- Voting summary: 11 voted for; None voted against; None abstained
- Result: Adopted

Security Council composition
- Permanent members: China; France; Soviet Union; United Kingdom; United States
- Non-permanent members: Argentina; Ceylon; Ecuador; Italy; Poland; Tunisia

United Nations Security Council Resolution 149, adopted unanimously on August 23, 1960, after examining the application of the Republic of Upper Volta (now Burkina Faso) for membership in the United Nations, the Council recommended to the General Assembly that the Republic of Upper Volta be admitted.

== See also ==
- List of United Nations Security Council Resolutions 101 to 200 (1953–1965)
