= List of United Nations Security Council Resolutions 101 to 200 =

This is a list of United Nations Security Council Resolutions 101 to 200 adopted between 24 November 1953 and 15 March 1965.

Resolution	Date	Vote	Concerns
101	24 November 1953	9–0–2 (abstentions: Lebanon, USSR)	Violation of General Armistice by Israel, the Qibya incident
102	3 December 1953	10–0–1 (abstention: USSR)	Japan and the International Court of Justice
103	3 December 1953	10–0–1 (abstention: USSR)	San Marino and the International Court of Justice
104	20 June 1954	11–0–0	1954 Guatemalan coup d'état
105	28 July 1954	Adopted without vote	Death of Benegal Narsing Rau and election to the International Court of Justice
106	29 March 1955	11–0–0	Condemning an Israeli attack on Egyptian Army in the Gaza Strip
107	30 March 1955	11–0–0	Calling for cooperation of Egypt and Israel with the Truce Supervision Organisation
108	8 September 1955	11–0–0	Appeal for unconditional ceasefire in Palestine
109	14 December 1955	8–0–3 (abstentions: Belgium, Republic of China, USA)	Admission of Albania, Jordan, Ireland, Portugal, Hungary, Italy, Austria, Romania, Bulgaria, Finland, Ceylon, Nepal, Libya, Cambodia, Laos, and Spain
110	16 December 1955	9–1–1 (against: USSR; abstention: France)	Review of Charter of the United Nations
111	19 January 1956	11–0–0	Israel, Syria and the General Armistice Agreement
112	6 February 1956	11–0–0	Admission of Sudan
113	4 April 1956	11–0–0	Reducing tensions along armistice lines in the Middle East
114	4 June 1956	11–0–0	Parties to the Armistice Agreement in the Middle East
115	20 July 1956	11–0–0	Admission of Morocco
116	26 July 1956	11–0–0	Admission of Tunisia
117	6 September 1956	11–0–0	Death of judge Hsu Mo and election to the International Court of Justice
118	13 October 1956	11–0–0	Egypt and the Suez Canal
119	31 October 1956	7–2–2 (against: France, UK; abstentions: Australia, Belgium)	Passing Suez Crisis debate to the General Assembly in its first emergency special session
120	4 November 1956	10–1–0 (against: USSR)	Passing Hungarian Revolution debate to the General Assembly in the second emergency special session
121	12 December 1956	11–0–0	Admission of Japan
122	24 January 1957	10–0–1 (abstention: USSR)	Jammu and Kashmir National Conference verdict
123	21 February 1957	10–0–1 (abstention: USSR)	President of the Council visit to Indian subcontinent
124	7 March 1957	11–0–0	Admission of Ghana
125	5 September 1957	11–0–0	Admission of Malaya (Malaysia)
126	2 December 1957	10–0–1 (abstention: USSR)	Visit to UN Representative to India, Pakistan and Kashmir
127	22 January 1958	11–0–0	Regulation by Chief of Staff of demilitarised zones in the Middle East
128	11 June 1958	10–0–1 (abstention: USSR)	Interference by the United Arab Republic in Lebanon
129	7 August 1958	11–0–0	Calling an emergency session of the General Assembly over Lebanon complaint
130	25 November 1958	Adopted without vote	Death of judge José Gustavo Guerrero and elections to the International Court of Justice
131	9 December 1958	10–0–1 (abstention: France)	Admission of Guinea
132	7 September 1959	10–1–0 (against: USSR)	Complaint by Laos of border violations by North Vietnamese troops
133	26 January 1960	11–0–0	Admission of Cameroon
134	1 April 1960	9–0–2 (abstentions: France, United Kingdom)	Condemning the Sharpeville Massacre and apartheid in South Africa
135	27 May 1960	9–0–2 (abstentions: Poland, USSR)	Relations between Security Council permanent members
136	31 May 1960	11–0–0	Admission of Togolese Republic (Togo)
137	31 May 1960	Adopted without vote	Death of judge Hersch Lauterpacht and elections to the International Court of Justice
138	23 June 1960	8–0–2 (abstentions: Poland, USSR)	Transfer of Adolf Eichmann from Argentina to Israel
139	28 June 1960	11–0–0	Admission of Federation of Mali
140	29 June 1960	11–0–0	Admission of Malagasy Republic (Madagascar)
141	5 July 1960	11–0–0	Admission of Somalia
142	7 July 1960	11–0–0	Admission of Republic of the Congo (Democratic Republic of the Congo)
143	14 July 1960	8–0–3 (abstentions: Republic of China, France, United Kingdom)	The Congo Crisis, calling for withdrawal of Belgian troops
144	19 July 1960	9–0–2 (abstentions: Poland, USSR)	Cuba–United States relations
145	22 July 1960	11–0–0	The Congo Crisis, withdrawal of Belgian troops
146	9 August 1960	9–0–2 (abstentions: France, Italy)	Congo Crisis: Entry of UN forces into Katanga
147	23 August 1960	11–0–0	Admission of Dahomey (Benin)
148	23 August 1960	11–0–0	Admission of Niger
149	23 August 1960	11–0–0	Admission of Upper Volta (Burkina Faso)
150	23 August 1960	11–0–0	Admission of Ivory Coast
151	23 August 1960	11–0–0	Admission of Chad
152	23 August 1960	11–0–0	Admission of Republic of the Congo
153	23 August 1960	11–0–0	Admission of Gabon
154	23 August 1960	11–0–0	Admission of Central African Republic
155	23 August 1960	11–0–0	Admission of Cyprus
156	9 September 1960	9–0–2 (abstentions: Poland, USSR)	Sanctioning the Trujillo regime in the Dominican Republic
157	17 September 1960	8-2-1 (against: Poland, USSR; abstention: France)	Emergency session of the General Assembly regarding the Congo Crisis
158	28 September 1960	11–0–0	Admission of Senegal
159	28 September 1960	11–0–0	Admission of Mali
160	7 October 1960	11–0–0	Admission of Nigeria
161	21 February 1961	9–0–2 (abstentions: France, USSR)	Death of Patrice Lumumba, withdrawal of non UN troops in the Congo
162	11 April 1961	8–0–3 (abstentions: Ceylon, USSR, United Arab Republic)	Israel–Jordan Mixed Armistice Commission resolution on Israel
163	9 June 1961	9–0–2 (abstentions: France, United Kingdom)	Angolan War of Independence and Portugal
164	22 July 1961	10–0–0 (present not voting: France)	Conflict between France and Tunisia
165	26 September 1961	11–0–0	Admission of Sierra Leone
166	25 October 1961	9–0–1 (abstention: USA; present not voting: Republic of China)	Admission of Mongolia
167	25 October 1961	9–1–1 (against: United Arab Republic; abstention: USSR)	Admission of Mauritania
168	3 November 1961	11–0–0	Recommendation for Acting Secretary General
169	24 November 1961	9–0–2 (abstentions: France, United Kingdom)	Congo: secessionist activities in Katanga, attacks on UN troops
170	14 December 1961	11–0–0	Admission of Tanganyika (Tanzania)
171	9 April 1962	10–0–1 (abstention: France)	Condemning Israel and Syria for military actions in Lake Tiberius area
172	26 July 1962	11–0–0	Admission of Rwanda
173	26 July 1962	11–0–0	Admission of Burundi
174	12 September 1962	11–0–0	Admission of Jamaica
175	12 September 1962	11–0–0	Admission of Trinidad and Tobago
176	4 October 1962	10–0–1 (abstention: Republic of China)	Admission of Algeria
177	15 October 1962	11–0–0	Admission of Uganda
178	24 April 1963	11–0–0	Violations of Senegalese territory by Portuguese forces
179	11 June 1963	10–0–1 (abstention: USSR)	North Yemen Civil War
180	31 July 1963	8–0–3 (abstentions: France, United Kingdom, USA)	Portuguese Empire
181	7 August 1963	9–0–2 (abstentions: France, United Kingdom)	Arms build up and South African apartheid
182	4 December 1963	11–0–0	South African apartheid
183	11 December 1963	10–0–1 (abstention: France)	Portuguese territories
184	16 December 1963	11–0–0	Admission of Zanzibar
185	16 December 1963	11–0–0	Admission of Kenya
186	4 March 1964	11–0–0	Recommendation of peacekeeping force in Cyprus
187	13 March 1964	11–0–0	United Nations Peacekeeping Force in Cyprus
188	9 April 1964	9–0–2 (abstentions: United Kingdom, USA)	British attacks in Yemen and airspace violation of Federation of South Arabia
189	4 June 1964	11–0–0	Violations by South Vietnamese troops into Cambodia
190	9 June 1964	7–0–4 (abstentions: Brazil, France, United Kingdom, USA)	Rivonia Trial in South Africa
191	18 June 1964	8–0–3 (abstentions: Czechoslovakia, France, USSR)	South African apartheid
192	20 June 1964	11–0–0	Extending peacekeeping force in Cyprus for 3 months
193	25 September 1964	9–0–2 (abstentions: Czechoslovakia, USSR)	Calling for Turkey to end bombing in Cyprus
194	25 September 1964	11–0–0	Extending peacekeeping force in Cyprus for 3 months
195	9 October 1964	11–0–0	Admission of Malawi
196	30 October 1964	11–0–0	Admission of Malta
197	30 October 1964	11–0–0	Admission of Zambia
198	18 December 1964	11–0–0	Extending the peacekeeping force in Cyprus for 3 months
199	30 December 1964	10–0–1 (abstention: France)	Calling for States to cease interference in the Congo
200	15 March 1965	11–0–0	Admission of The Gambia

== See also ==
- Lists of United Nations Security Council resolutions
- List of United Nations Security Council Resolutions 1 to 100
- List of United Nations Security Council Resolutions 201 to 300
