= United Nations Security Council Resolution 180 =

UN Security Council Resolution 180
- Date: July 31 1963
- Meeting no.: 1049
- Code: S/5380 (Document)
- Subject: Question relating to Territories under Portuguese administration
- Voting summary: 8 voted for; None voted against; 3 abstained
- Result: Adopted

Security Council composition
- Permanent members: China; France; Soviet Union; United Kingdom; United States
- Non-permanent members: Brazil; Ghana; Morocco; Norway; Philippines; Venezuela

United Nations Security Council Resolution 180, adopted on July 31, 1963, affirmed that Portugal claiming its overseas territories as part of metropolitan Portugal was contrary to the principles of the Charter. The Council deemed Portugal's actions and attitude as seriously disturbing to peace and security in Africa.

The Council called upon Portugal to immediately recognize the right of the peoples of its empire to self-determination and independence, the cessation of all acts of repression and withdrawal of all military and paramilitary forces, unconditional political amnesty and the establishment of conditions that will allow the free functioning of political parties, negotiations to transfer power to freely elected representatives of the peoples and the granting of independence to all the territories under its administration. The Council requested that all governments refrain from aiding Portugal in its repression in any way, including the sale of military equipment.

The resolution, proposed by 32 African states, was adopted with eight votes to none, with France, the United Kingdom and the United States abstaining.

== See also ==
- List of United Nations Security Council Resolutions 101 to 200 (1953–1965)
- Portuguese Empire
- Portuguese Colonial War
