= United Nations Security Council Resolution 118 =

UN Security Council Resolution 118
- Date: October 13 1956
- Meeting no.: 743
- Code: S/3675 (Document)
- Subject: Complaint by France and the United Kingdom against Egypt
- Voting summary: 11 voted for; None voted against; None abstained
- Result: Adopted

Security Council composition
- Permanent members: China; France; Soviet Union; United Kingdom; United States
- Non-permanent members: Australia; Belgium; Cuba; Iran; Peru; Yugoslavia

United Nations Security Council Resolution 118, adopted unanimously on October 13, 1956, after noting the declarations made before it and the accounts of the development of the exploratory conversations on the Suez question given by the Secretary-General and the Foreign Ministers of Egypt, France and the United Kingdom, the Council agreed that any settlement of the Suez question should meet the following requirements:

1. There should be free and open transit through the Canal without discrimination, overt or covert—this covers both political and technical aspects
2. The sovereignty of Egypt should be respected
3. The operation of the Canal should be insulated from the politics of any country
4. The manner of fixing tolls and charges should be decided by agreement between Egypt and the Users
5. A fair proportion of the dues should be allotted to development
6. In case of disputes, unresolved affairs between the Suez Canal Company and the Egyptian Government should be settled by arbitration with suitable terms of reference and suitable provisions for the payment of sums found to be due.

== See also ==
- List of United Nations Security Council Resolutions 101 to 200 (1953–1965)
- The Suez Crisis
