= United Nations Security Council Resolution 117 =

UN Security Council Resolution 117
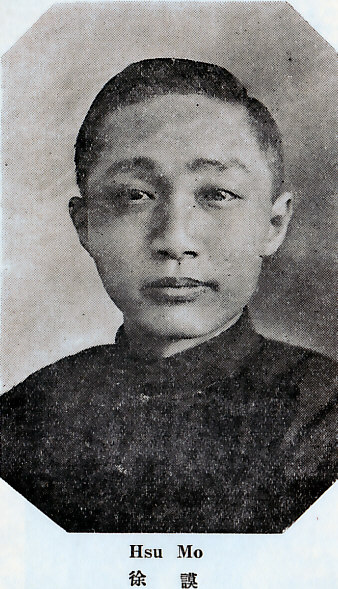
- Hsu Mo
- Date: September 6 1956
- Meeting no.: 733
- Code: S/3643 (Document)
- Subject: International Court of Justice
- Result: Adopted

Security Council composition
- Permanent members: China; France; Soviet Union; United Kingdom; United States
- Non-permanent members: Australia; Belgium; Cuba; Iran; Peru; Yugoslavia

United Nations Security Council Resolution 117, adopted on September 6, 1956, after the death of Judge Hsu Mo of the International Court of Justice the Council decided that the election to fill the vacancy for the rest of Judge Mo's term would take place during the eleventh session of the General Assembly.

The resolution was adopted without vote.

== See also ==
- List of United Nations Security Council Resolutions 101 to 200 (1953–1965)
