= United Nations Security Council Resolution 130 =

United Nations Security Council resolution

UN Security Council Resolution 130
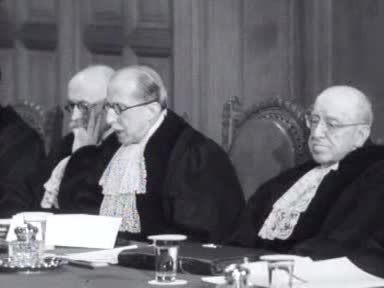
- José Gustavo Guerrero (speaking)
- Date: November 25 1958
- Meeting no.: 840
- Code: S/4118 (Document)
- Subject: International Court of Justice
- Result: Adopted

Security Council composition
- Permanent members: China; France; Soviet Union; United Kingdom; United States
- Non-permanent members: Canada; Colombia; Iraq; Japan; Panama; Sweden

United Nations Security Council Resolution 130, adopted on November 25, 1958, noted with regret the death of Judge José Gustavo Guerrero on October 25, 1958. The Council then decided that in accordance with the Statute of the Court the resulting vacancy in the International Court of Justice would be resolved by an election in the General Assembly that would take place during the fourteenth session of that body.

The resolution was adopted without vote.

== See also ==
- List of United Nations Security Council Resolutions 101 to 200 (1953–1965)
