= United Nations Security Council Resolution 132 =

UN Security Council Resolution 132
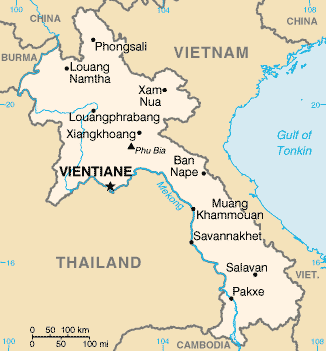
- Laos
- Date: September 7, 1959
- Meeting no.: 848
- Code: S/4216 (Document)
- Subject: Question relating to Laos
- Voting summary: 10 voted for; 1 voted against; None abstained
- Result: Adopted

Security Council composition
- Permanent members: China; France; Soviet Union; United Kingdom; United States
- Non-permanent members: Argentina; Canada; Italy; Japan; Panama; Tunisia

United Nations Security Council Resolution 132, adopted on September 7, 1959, decided to appoint a sub-committee consisting of Argentina, Italy, Japan and Tunisia, and instructed it to examine statements made before the Council concerning Laos and to receive further statements and documents, and make inquiries and report to the Council as soon as possible. It was the only resolution adopted by the Security Council in 1959.

Laos had previously accused troops from North Vietnam of crossing its shared border and undertaking military attacks against Laos; the Security Council President convened a meeting urgently.

Resolution 132 was adopted by ten votes to one against, from the Soviet Union.

The sub-committee concluded that the crossings were of a guerilla nature and it could not be clearly established that North Vietnamese troops were responsible.

== See also ==
- List of United Nations Security Council Resolutions 101 to 200 (1953–1965)
