= United Nations Security Council Resolution 136 =

United Nations Security Council resolution

UN Security Council Resolution 136
- Date: May 31 1960
- Meeting no.: 864
- Code: S/4330 (Document)
- Subject: Admission of new Members to the UN: Togolese Republic
- Voting summary: 11 voted for; None voted against; None abstained
- Result: Adopted

Security Council composition
- Permanent members: China; France; Soviet Union; United Kingdom; United States
- Non-permanent members: Argentina; Ceylon; Ecuador; Italy; Poland; Tunisia

United Nations Security Council Resolution 136, adopted on May 31, 1960, after examining the application of the Togolese Republic for membership in the United Nations, the Council recommended to the General Assembly that the Togolese Republic be admitted.

The resolution was approved unanimously by all 11 members of the Council.

== See also ==
- List of United Nations Security Council Resolutions 101 to 200 (1953–1965)
