= United Nations Security Council Resolution 113 =

UN Security Council Resolution 113
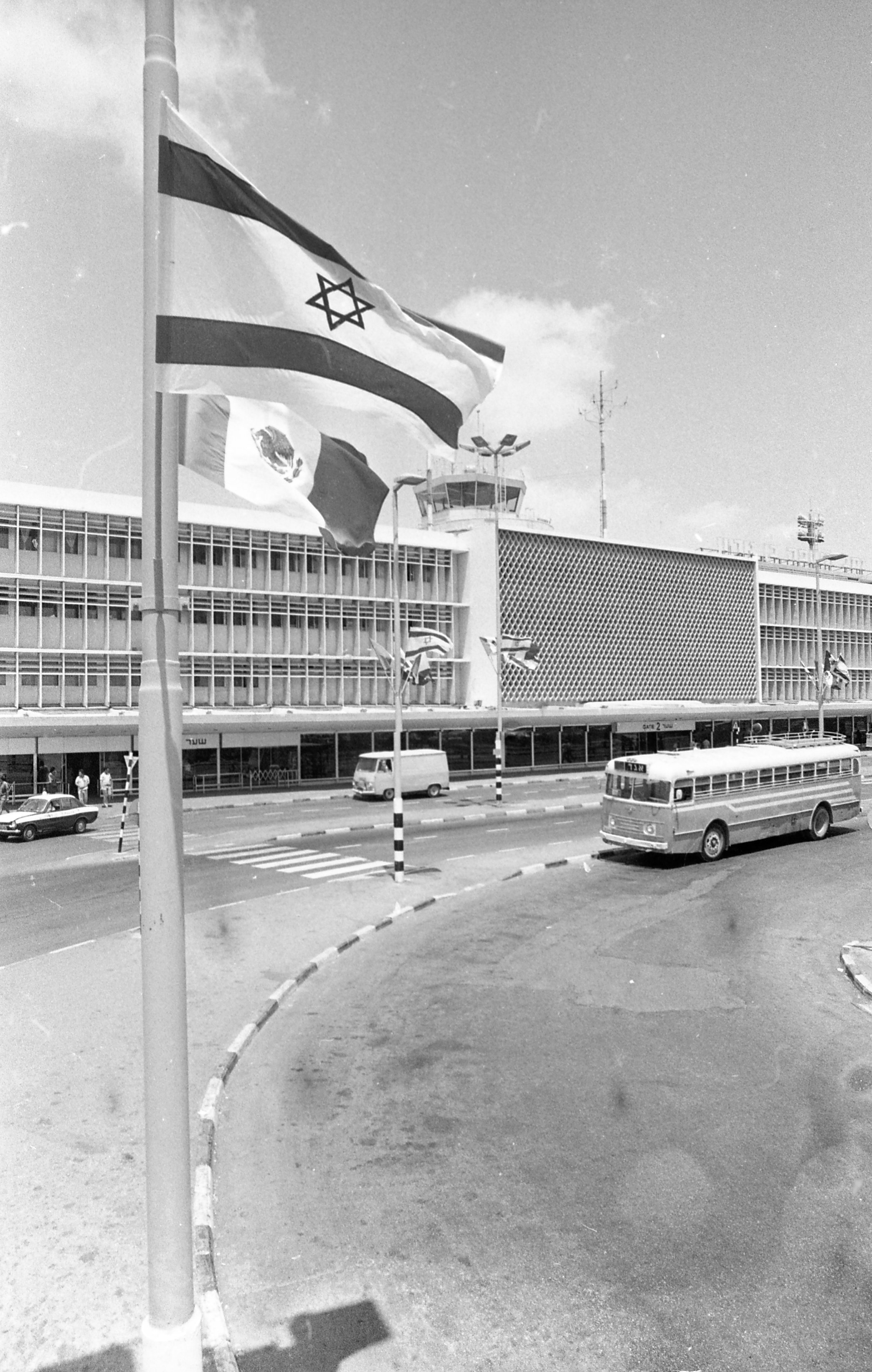
- Israel flag
- Date: April 4 1956
- Meeting no.: 722
- Code: S/3575 (Document)
- Subject: The Palestine Question
- Voting summary: 11 voted for; None voted against; None abstained
- Result: Adopted

Security Council composition
- Permanent members: China; France; Soviet Union; United Kingdom; United States
- Non-permanent members: Australia; Belgium; Cuba; Iran; Peru; Yugoslavia

United Nations Security Council Resolution 113, adopted on April 4, 1956, after recalling past resolutions where the Chief of Staff of the United Nations Truce Supervision Organization in Palestine was requested to undertake certain specific steps for the purpose of reducing tensions along the armistice lines the Council noted with grave concern the proposed steps had not been carried out. The Council considered the situation as likely to endanger the maintenance of international peace and security and requested the Secretary-General survey the various aspects of enforcement of compliance with the four General Armistice Agreements.

The Council then requested that the Secretary-General, along with the Chief of Staff arrange for the adoption of measures they believe would reduce tensions along the armistice demarcation lines including withdrawal of forces, full freedom of movement for UN observers and the establishment of the local arrangements for the prevention of incidents and the prompt detection of any violations of the Armistice Agreements. The council the called upon the parties to the General Armistice Agreement to co-operate with the Secretary-General in the implementation of this resolution and requested the Secretary-General report back to the Council inside a month.

The resolution was adopted unanimously by all members of the council.

== See also ==
- Arab–Israeli conflict
- List of United Nations Security Council Resolutions 101 to 200 (1953–1965)
