= United Nations Security Council Resolution 134 =

United Nations Security Council resolution

UN Security Council Resolution 134
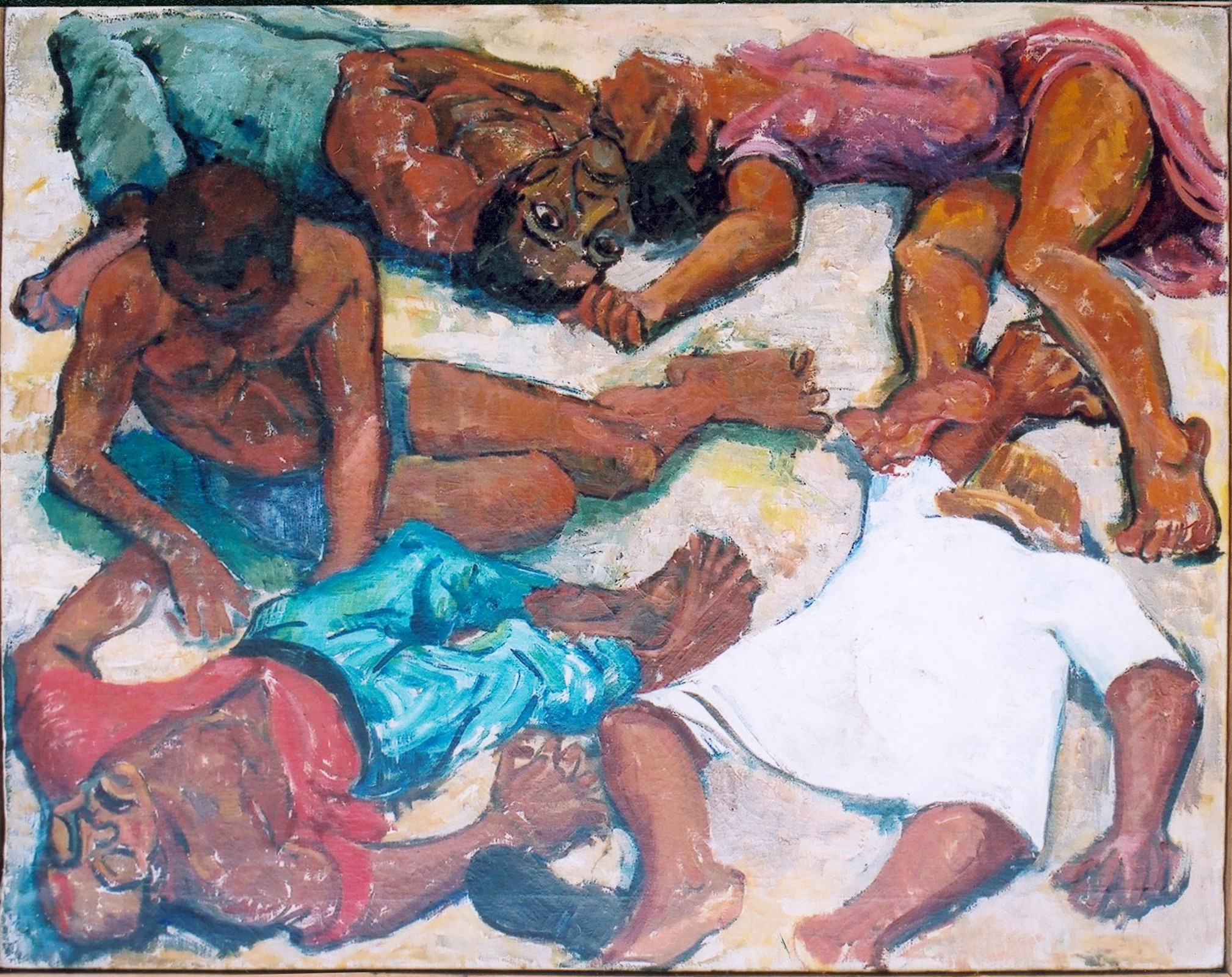
- Painting depicting Sharpeville massacre
- Date: April 1, 1960
- Meeting no.: 856
- Code: S/4300 (Document)
- Subject: Question relating to the situation in the Union of South Africa
- Voting summary: 9 voted for; None voted against; 2 abstained
- Result: Adopted

Security Council composition
- Permanent members: China; France; Soviet Union; United Kingdom; United States
- Non-permanent members: Argentina; Ceylon; Ecuador; Italy; Poland; Tunisia

United Nations Security Council Resolution 134, adopted on April 1, 1960, was passed after a complaint by twenty-nine Member States regarding "the situation arising out of the large-scale killings of unarmed and peaceful demonstrators against racial discrimination and segregation in the Union of South Africa". The Council recognized that the situation was brought about by the policies of the government of the Union of South Africa and that if these policies continued they could endanger international peace and security.

The resolution voiced the Council's aggravation at the policies and actions of the government, offered their sympathies to the families of the victims, called upon the government to initiate measures aimed at bringing about racial harmony based on equality and called upon it to abandon apartheid. The Council then requested that the Secretary-General Dag Hammarskjöld consult with the government of the Union of South Africa to make arrangements to help uphold the principles of the Charter and to report to the Council whenever necessary and appropriate.

The resolution was adopted with nine votes; France and the United Kingdom abstained.

== See also ==
- List of United Nations Security Council Resolutions 101 to 200 (1953–1965)
- South Africa under apartheid
