= United Nations Security Council Resolution 187 =

UN Security Council Resolution 187
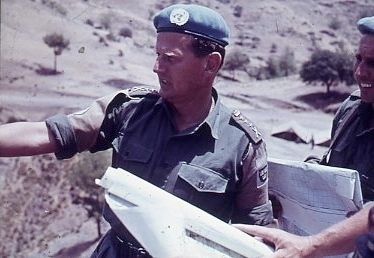
- Peacekeeping in Cyprus
- Date: March 13 1964
- Meeting no.: 1103
- Code: S/5603 (Document)
- Subject: The Cyprus Question
- Voting summary: 11 voted for; None voted against; None abstained
- Result: Adopted

Security Council composition
- Permanent members: China; France; Soviet Union; United Kingdom; United States
- Non-permanent members: Bolivia; Brazil; Czechoslovakia; Ivory Coast; Morocco; Norway

United Nations Security Council Resolution 187, adopted unanimously on March 13, 1964, after hearing representatives from Cyprus, Greece and Turkey and being deeply concerned over development in the area, the Council noted with assurance words from the Secretary-General that the forces about to become the Peace-Keeping Force in Cyprus were at the moment en route there.

The Council reaffirmed its call for all Member States for conform to their obligations under the Charter and requested the Secretary-General press on with his efforts.

== See also ==
- Cyprus dispute
- List of United Nations Security Council Resolutions 101 to 200 (1953–1965)
- United Nations Security Council Resolution 186
