= United Nations Security Council Resolution 107 =

UN Security Council Resolution 107
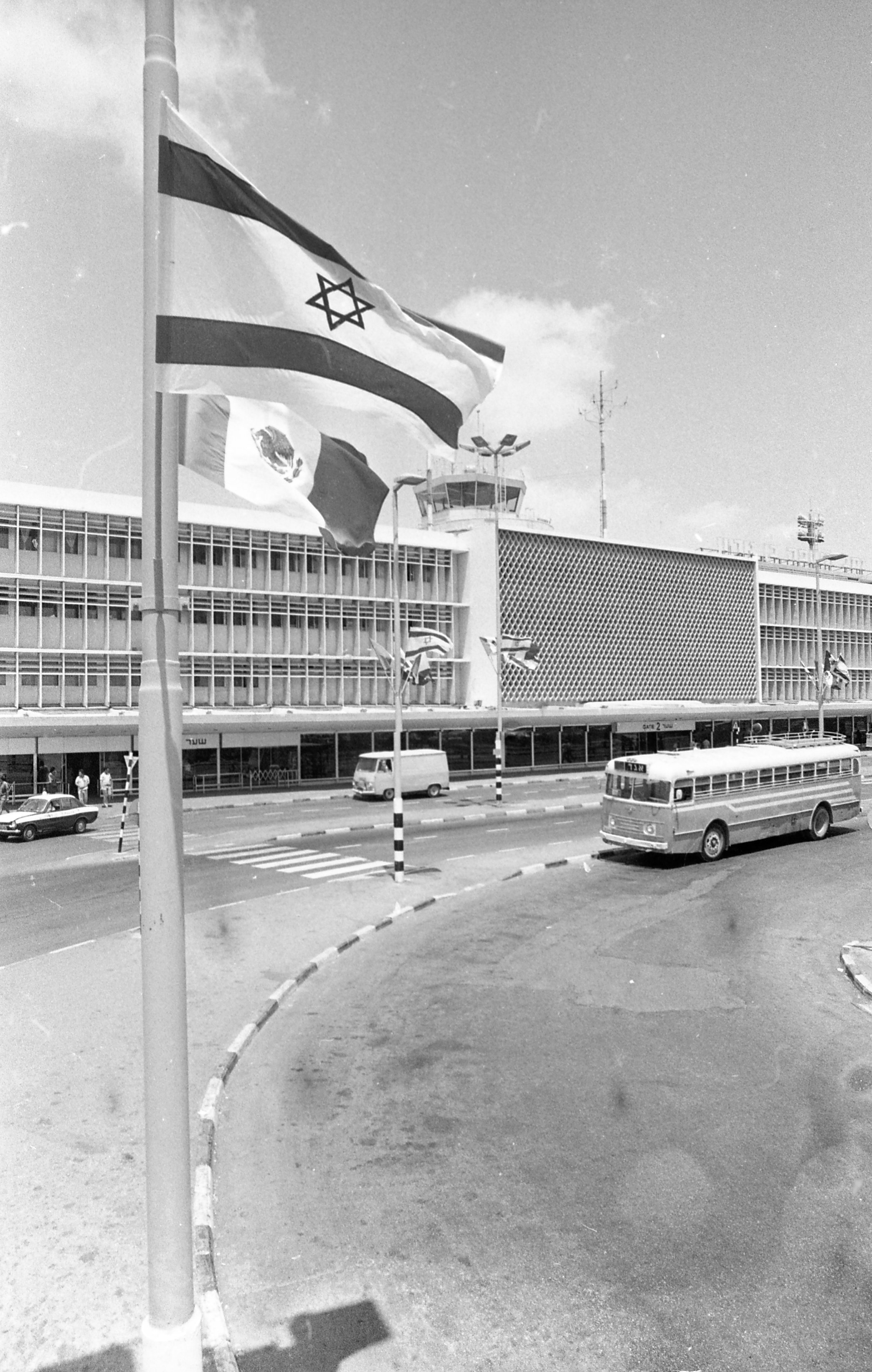
- Israel flag
- Date: March 30 1955
- Meeting no.: 696
- Code: S/3379 (Document)
- Subject: The Palestine Question
- Voting summary: 11 voted for; None voted against; None abstained
- Result: Adopted

Security Council composition
- Permanent members: China; France; Soviet Union; United Kingdom; United States
- Non-permanent members: Belgium; Brazil; Iran; New Zealand; Peru; Turkey

United Nations Security Council Resolution 107 was a Security Council resolution adopted unanimously on March 30, 1955, calling upon the Egyptian and Israeli governments to cooperate with the proposals outlined in a report previously issued by the chief of staff of the United Nations Truce Supervision Organization in Palestine.

== See also ==
- List of United Nations Security Council Resolutions 101 to 200 (1953–1965)
- United Nations Security Council Resolution 106
