= Japan and the United Nations =

State of Japan

United Nations membership
- Membership: Full member
- Since: 18 December 1956; 69 years ago
- UNSC seat: Non-permanent (G4 member)
- Ambassador: Kazuyuki Yamazaki

Japan became the 80th member of the United Nations on 18 December 1956. Since then, Japan has participated in many internationally cooperative initiatives with other members of the United Nations as a basic principle of its foreign policy. When Japan joined the UN in 1956, it did so with great enthusiasm and broad public support, for the international organization was seen to embody the pacified country's hopes for a peaceful world order. Membership was welcomed by many Japanese who saw the UN as a guarantor of a policy of unarmed neutrality for their nation, in addition to the security arrangement they concluded with US in 1951. To others, support for the UN would be useful in masking or diluting Japan's almost total dependence on the United States for its security. The government saw the UN as an ideal arena for its risk minimizing, omnidirectional foreign policy.

== Role in the UN ==
After the late 1950s, Japan participated actively in the social and economic activities of the UN's various specialized agencies and other international organizations concerned with social, cultural, and economic improvement. During the 1970s, as it attained the status of an economic powerhouse, Japan was called on to play an increasingly large role in the UN. As Japan's role and its contributions increased so did sentiment, expressed as early as 1973, that Japan should be given a permanent seat on the United Nations Security Council (UNSC) with the United States, the Soviet Union, the United Kingdom, France, and China.

== UN peacekeeping efforts ==
By 1990, Japan's international cooperation efforts had reached a new level of involvement and activism. Japan contributed about 11 percent of the regular UN budget, second only to the United States, which contributed 25 percent. Japan has been particularly active in UN peacekeeping activities since 1989, when it first sent officials to observe and participate in UN peacekeeping efforts in Afghanistan, Iran, Iraq, and Namibia. In 1992–93 Japan led UN supervision of the peace process and elections in Cambodia, providing approximately 2,000 people, which included members of the Japan Self-Defense Forces.

== Reform of the UNSC ==
As of 2005, Japan is again a strong advocate of a UNSC reform, in a joint campaign with Germany, India, and Brazil. All four nations strive to gain a permanent seat in the chamber. While the United Kingdom and France, and the United States back Japan's candidacy, it faces strong opposition from its two closest neighbors, China and South Korea.

== Other organizations ==
In addition to its UN activities and its participation in Asian regional groupings, such as the Colombo Plan and the Asian Development Bank, Japan is also involved, beginning in the 1950s, in worldwide economic groupings largely made up of, or dominated by, the industrialized countries of Western Europe and North America. In 1952, Japan became a member of the International Monetary Fund (IMF) and of the World Bank, where it played an increasingly important role. In 1955, it joined the General Agreement on Tariffs and Trade (GATT). In 1966, Japan was admitted to the Organisation for Economic Co-operation and Development (OECD), which brought it into what was essentially a club of leading industrialized countries. Japan has participated actively since 1975 in the annual summit meetings of the seven largest capitalist countries, the Group of Seven, or G8, since Russia joined after the end of the Cold War.

== See also ==
- United Nations University in Tokyo
- Aiichiro Fujiyama headed Japan's first delegation to the United Nations in 1957 as Japan's foreign minister (1957–60)
- Japanese Peace Bell
