= History of Ecuador (1960–1979) =

Overview of the history of Ecuador, 1960–1979

Republic of Ecuador República del Ecuador
- 1960–1979
- Flag Coat of arms
- Motto: "Dios, patria y libertad"
- Anthem: Salve, Oh Patria
- Ecuador in 1989
- Capital: Quito
- Government: Presidential republic under a military dictatorship
- President
  - 1960–1961: José María Velasco Ibarra
  - 1961-1963: Carlos Julio Arosemena Monroy
  - 1963-1966: Ramón Castro Jijón
  - 1966: Clemente Yerovi
  - 1966-1968: Otto Arosemena
  - 1968-1972: José María Velasco Ibarra
  - 1972-1976: Guillermo Rodríguez Lara
  - 1976-1979: Alfredo Poveda
- Vice President
  - See list: See list (from Carlos Julio Arosemena Monroy to Osvaldo Hurtado)
- Legislature: National Congress
- History
  - Established: 1 September 1960
  - Disestablished: 10 August 1979
Preceded by	Succeeded by
Ecuador	Ecuador
- Today part of: Ecuador

The history of the Republic of Ecuador from 1960 to 1990 encompasses a period of political, social, and economic changes in the country. During this time, Ecuador experienced military regimes, political instability, social movements, and economic challenges.

== José María Velasco Ibarra (1960–1961) ==
The instability began immediately. Ponce was so angry over Velasco's vicious campaign attacks on his government that he resigned on his last day in office rather than preside over the inauguration of his successor. During his campaign, "the National Personification" had promised government support to the masses of urban poor, many of whom had recently migrated to Guayaquil and other major cities in search of a decent job and a place to live. Velasco's populism continued into his inaugural address, when he renounced the hated 1942 Rio Protocol. He thus came to power with the adoration of the masses, but he saddled himself with expensive commitments to the poor at a time when deficits in the state coffers were approaching a critical level. Additionally, Velasco threatened Ecuador's shaky economy with what amounted to a declaration of hostilities against Peru and the guarantors of the Rio Protocol, namely Argentina, Brazil, Chile, and the United States.

Sensing the direction of the political wind in the wake of the Cuban Revolution, Velasco magnified his anti-United States rhetoric and included leftists in his government. Meanwhile, the United States encouraged Latin American governments to break diplomatic relations with Cuba. Before long, Ecuador's widening political polarization became manifest in outbreaks of violence between leftist students and the anticommunist right.

The rapidly deteriorating economic situation soon brought about a split in the velasquista coalition, however, with the left, led by Vice President Carlos Julio Arosemena Monroy (who was also president of the Chamber of Deputies) openly opposing the government in July 1961. By October relations between Velasco's government and Congress had deteriorated to the point where legislators and progovernment spectators engaged in a gun battle. Although dozens of bullet holes were later found in the Chamber, no one was injured.

A series of new sales taxes imposed during the same month in order to raise desperately needed revenues then sparked a general strike and a series of demonstrations and riots in several major cities. Amid growing chaos, Velasco ordered the arrest of his vice president, a move that opened him to charges of violating the constitution. On November 8, after only fourteen months in office, Velasco was ousted by the military and replaced by Vice President Arosemena, who was his constitutional successor as well as his leading opponent.

== Carlos Julio Arosemena Monroy (1961–1963) ==
Arosemena's insistence on maintaining relations with Cuba, however, became a major domestic political issue in Ecuador. Political opponents labeled Arosemena a dangerous communist, and part of the military went into open rebellion in March 1962. The following month, Ecuador broke diplomatic relations with Cuba, Poland, and Czechoslovakia. The crisis over Cuba proved to be very costly for Arosemena, who lost not only much of his local political support, but also the self-confidence to pursue his own, independent course. Afterward, the government drifted with little leadership from the president, who allegedly indulged in frequent drinking bouts.

The brief appearance of a guerrilla movement in the coastal jungle and a rash of small-scale terrorist incidents (many of which later were found to have been staged by right-wing provocateurs) also left Arosemena open to accusations of being either unable or unwilling to stop communist subversion. By early 1963, military conspiracy was again afoot. On July 11 the high command of the armed forces decided, without dissent, to depose Arosemena.

== Junta (1963–1967) ==
The four-man military junta that seized power announced its intention not to return the nation to constitutional rule until the institution of basic socioeconomic reforms, which both Velasco and Arosemena had promised but never implemented. This failure by their two civilian predecessors, the junta believed, had become a source of growing frustration within the lower classes, thus making them more receptive to the lure of communism. The junta combined its reformist anticommunism with the more traditional hard-line variety. After jailing or exiling the entire leadership of the communist left, the new government reorganized the nation's two leading universities in an effort to eliminate them as sources of left-wing political activity.

In July 1964, the junta decreed the Agrarian Reform Law to commemorate the first anniversary of its assumption of power. The law abolished the huasipungo system, the feudalistic land tenure arrangement widely used in the Sierra. However, the law resulted in little real improvement in the lives of the long-suffering Sierra peasants and died from lack of funding under subsequent civilian governments.

Meaningful reform was precluded, in part at least, by the increasingly cumbersome process of decision making within the politically heterogeneous, plural executive. Insubordination by the air force representative on the junta led to his dismissal and arrest in November 1965; thereafter, the junta had only three members.

In 1965 Ecuador also saw a dramatic drop in its revenue from banana exports and, despite generous development assistance from the United States government and the Inter-American Development Bank, the junta suddenly faced an economic crisis of major proportions. The announcement of increased taxes on imports sparked the opposition of the powerful Guayaquil Chamber of Commerce, which in March called for a general strike. Long- disgruntled student groups and labor unions were only too happy to join in the protest, which rapidly spread to other cities. On March 29, 1966, following a bloody and demoralizing attack on the Central University in Quito, the disillusioned military reformers stepped down.

=== Transition (1966–1967) ===
The following day, a small group of civilian leaders named Clemente Yerovi Indaburu, a non-partisan banana grower who had served as minister of economy under Galo Plaza, to be provisional president. In October a popularly elected constituent assembly drafted a new constitution and elected Otto Arosemena Gómez, a cousin of Carlos Julio and a political centrist, to act as a second provisional president. During his twenty months in office, the new constitution went into effect in May 1967, and popular elections for president were held in June 1968. Incredibly, Velasco—now seventy-five years old—was voted into the presidency for the fifth time, an incredible thirty-four years after his initial victory.

== Velasco (1968–1972) ==
The weakness of Velasco's mandate—he managed only a plurality of barely one-third of the popular vote in a crowded field of five candidates—foreshadowed political difficulties that plagued him during his final term. His newly formed National Velasquista Federation (Federación Nacional Velasquista—FNV) was far short of a majority in either house of Congress, and a failure to build any working coalition made for a stalemate in the legislative process. Even Velasco's own vice president, a Guayaquileño Liberal named Jorge Zavala Baquerizo, turned into a strident and vocal critic. Cabinet ministers came and went with astonishing frequency. This political impasse soon combined with the fiscal and balance-of- payments crises, which by now had become customary under the spendthrift habits and administrative mismanagement associated with each of Velasco's terms in office, to spawn a major political crisis. The turning point came on June 22, 1970, when Velasco, in an action known as an autogolpe (self-seizure of power), dismissed Congress and the Supreme Court and assumed dictatorial powers.

Velasco subsequently decreed a number of extremely unpopular economic measures. After devaluing the sucre for the first time since 1961, he placed tight controls on foreign exchange transactions and then decreed a number of new tax measures, the most controversial of which raised import tariffs considerably. Velasco attempted to compensate for his lost prestige by baiting the United States, seizing and fining United States fishing boats found within 200 nautical miles (370 km) of the Ecuadorian coast. The intensification of the "tuna war" inflamed tempers in both countries; Ecuador dismissed United States military advisers, and the United States withdrew almost all economic and military aid to Ecuador. Such nationalistic adventures were of only momentary value to Velasco, however. In 1971, amid mounting civic unrest that verified the extent of the opposition, he was forced to cancel a scheduled national plebiscite in which he hoped to replace the 1967 constitution, with the charter written under his own auspices in 1946 the Constitution, Velasco argued, made the president too weak to be effective.

The president's autogolpe and his continuance in power were possible because of support from the armed forces. Velasco's key ally was his nephew and minister of defense, General Jorge Acosta Velasco, who continually reshuffled the high command in order to retain velasquistas in key posts. In the wake of a failed attempt to oust the powerful commandant of the Quito military academy in April 1971, however, Acosta himself was forced to resign his ministerial portfolio and was summarily dispatched to Madrid as ambassador. Having lost the man who was his linchpin in the armed forces and the only apparent heir to the velasquista throne, Velasco was left to the mercy of the high command.

Two circumstances proved critical in persuading the military to overthrow Velasco before the scheduled completion of his term in 1972. On the one hand, the state was due very shortly to begin reaping vast revenues under a 1964 petroleum concession. On the other hand, the overwhelming favorite to win the presidency in 1972 was Asaad Bucaram Elmhalim, a former street peddler who in 1960 had seized the leadership of the CFP from Guevara Moreno and later had twice been an extremely popular mayor of Guayaquil. Both the military and the business community regarded Bucaram as dangerous and unpredictable and unfit to be president, especially at a time when unprecedented income was expected to flow into the state coffers. On February 15, 1972, four months before the scheduled elections, the military under the command of Jorge Queirolo G. once again overthrew Velasco, who was sent into his final period of exile. He was replaced by a three-man military junta headed by the Army chief of staff, General Guillermo Rodríguez Lara.

== Junta (1972–1979) ==
The military regime called itself "nationalist and revolutionary," but the well-known connections of Rodríguez Lara to the Guayaquil business community signaled disappointment for those who anticipated that he would head a progressive military regime such as was ruling in Peru at the time. It shortly became apparent that, ideologically, the General Guillermo Rodríguez Lara regime was a hybrid, reflecting a tenuous equilibrium among the widely divergent political tendencies within the Ecuadorian armed forces. Nevertheless, like the contemporary Peruvian and Brazilian regimes, the regime of Rodríguez Lara, he promised, would not be an interim government, but rather a long-term venture dedicated to introducing structural changes thought necessary to unfreeze the development process.

Rodríguez Lara's regime gave early emphasis to a campaign designed in part to exert firm control over the nation's petroleum resources and in part to consolidate the government's political authority. Several former political leaders, including ex-President Otto Arosemena, were tried for corruption in connection with oil concessions granted during the 1960s. In addition, a large number of functionaries of the Velasco government, supporters of Bucaram, as well as drug traffickers, legitimate importers, and customs officials were charged with corruption and "illegal enrichment." Although it thus assailed its major opponents from the start the military regime, however, failed to build its own civilian base of political support.

Promises of a "meaningful agrarian reform" under the auspices of Minister of Agriculture Guillermo Maldonado, a dedicated reformer, were frustrated by intense opposition from traditional elites. Maldonado was eventually forced out, and by the end of Rodríguez Lara's four years in office less than 1 percent of Ecuador's cultivable land had changed hands under the reform. More notable achievements came in the areas of building infrastructure projects, such as the major oil refinery and petrochemical complex in Esmeraldas; various highway and electrification projects; and state capitalist enterprises, particularly the Ecuadorian State Petroleum Corporation (Corporación Estatal Petrolera Ecuatoriana—CEPE). The latter corporation was founded in 1972 and grew to become the major actor in Ecuador's exploitation of its oil reserves.

Oil policy was the regime's vehicle for its most forceful expression of nationalism. Minister of Natural Resources Gustavo Jarrín Ampudia presided over Ecuador's 1973 entry into the Organization of Petroleum Exporting Countries (OPEC), with all its attendant prestige and economic benefits. He was also responsible for Ecuador's renegotiation of a number of oil concessions, including the key Texaco-Gulf concession in the Oriente, on terms much more favorable to the state, such as substantial increases in both the royalties paid by foreign firms and the tax rate they paid on petroleum exports. These efforts were initially successful in allowing the government to retain a larger share of Ecuador's petroleum earnings.

The oil companies became increasingly disconcerted, however, when Jarrín proposed in late 1974 that the share of stock in the Texaco-Gulf subsidiary held by CEPE be increased from 25 to 51 percent. Claiming that the terms of their concessions negotiated with Jarrín had priced Ecuadorian oil beyond the world market price, the oil companies cut back drastically on their exports, at a cost to the government of hundreds of millions of dollars over the following nine months. This intense financial pressure finally led to a July 1975 announcement that taxes on the oil companies' exports were being reduced. It was thus clear that the military regime had overplayed its nationalistic oil policy, having failed to keep in mind that Ecuador was, after all, a relatively small oil producer and thus not a powerful player within OPEC.

The moderation of the regime's oil policy, however, did not result in the anticipated resolution of mounting economic problems. Oil exports rose only slightly, while imports, particularly of luxury items, continued to soar, aided by a low-tariff policy that had been designed to soak up petroleum earnings, and thus control inflation. In excess of 22 percent during 1974, inflation was rapidly eroding the real value of wages within the middle class.

In August, in an effort to resolve its balance-of-payments difficulties, the regime decreed a 60 percent duty on imported luxury items. The measure was condemned by the Chambers of Commerce in Quito and Guayaquil, whose constituents had grown dependent on the sale of imports, and caused, a week later, a bloody attempt led by the chairman of the Joint Chiefs of Staff, General Raúl González Alvear, to overthrow Rodríguez Lara. Although this coup attempt failed, at a cost of twenty-two lives, on January 11, 1976, a second, bloodless coup was successful in removing Rodríguez Lara. He was replaced by the Supreme Council of Government consisting of the commanders of the three armed services: Alfredo Poveda (Navy), Luis Leoro (Air Force) and Guillermo Durán (Army).

=== Transition ===
Virtually the only item on the agenda of the new military triumvirate was to preside over a return of the government to constitutional, civilian rule. The bloody September 1975 coup attempt had revealed the depth of the breach in the institutional unity of the armed forces. Handing the government back to civilians, it was hoped, might remove the causes of divisions within the military, or at least make it easier to hide them from public view.

The original timetable, announced in June 1976, called for a transition that was to culminate in presidential elections in February 1978. First, new government charters and electoral laws were to be drafted by appointed commissions, and then a public referendum would choose between two proposed constitutions. The transition was repeatedly slowed down, however, and in the end, instead of the less than two years originally scheduled, three years and eight months elapsed between the 1976 coup and the inauguration of a civilian president.

Two reasons are commonly cited for the delay: the slowness of decision making within the Supreme Council of Government because of ongoing disagreement within the military high command and repeated maneuverings by the military government to manipulate the electoral process, thereby controlling its outcome. Like the Rodríguez Lara government, the Council was particularly interested in seeing a poor electoral performance by the CFP and, especially, preventing Bucaram from winning the presidency.

The national referendum to choose the constitution was finally held on 15 January 1978. The results saw 23 percent of the voting population nullify their ballots, an action that had been advocated by the traditional right; 31 percent of the population voted in favor of a revised version of the 1945 constitution, and a plurality of 44 percent voted in favor of the newly drafted national charter. The charter was the more progressive of the two constitutions, its major reforms being the acknowledgement of a role for the state in socioeconomic development, the legalization of a worker self-managed sector in the economy, a unicameral legislature, no presidential re-election, and, for the first time in Ecuador, electoral suffrage for illiterates.

Five candidates then campaigned for the presidency. The consistent favorite in polls was Rodrigo Borja of the social democratic Democratic Left (Izquierda Democrática—ID). Because the Supreme Council of Government made sure that Bucaram was barred from running, the CFP strongman named his second in command, Jaime Roldós Aguilera, to be the party's candidate. In order to broaden the appeal of the ticket, Osvaldo Hurtado, the leader of the Christian Democratic Party (Partido Demócrata Cristiano—PDC), was tapped to be Roldós's vice presidential running mate. The traditional rightist vote was split between two candidates, and the various parties of the Marxist left coalesced to name one candidate. After a lengthy recount, the final results of the July 16 election confirmed the initial tally of a surprise victory by Roldós, with 27 percent of the national vote. Sixto Durán Ballén, candidate of a coalition of rightist parties, finished second with 24 percent. The electoral law mandated that when no candidate achieved a majority vote, a run-off election between the two top finishers be held.

It was more than nine months before the second-round election took place, however. They were months of considerable political tension and doubt as to whether the transition would proceed as planned. First, widespread problems in organizing the election and in the vote count during the first round left serious doubts as to the competence and honesty of the electoral authorities. The Supreme Electoral Tribunal (Tribunal Superior Electoral—TSE) was, as a result, completely reorganized. Second, the government—remembering a campaign slogan calling "Roldós to the government, Bucaram to power"—was understandably dismayed with results of the first-round election. By delaying the second round, the government sought to give rightists the time to build an anti-Roldós coalition under which Durán could emerge as the second-round victor. To complicate matters further, Abdón Calderón Múñoz, a populist candidate who had won 9 percent of the vote in the first round, was murdered under circumstances implicating the government. Finally, as a further distraction during this difficult period, Velasco returned from exile to bury his wife and died in March 1979 at age eighty-six.

The second round was finally held on April 29, 1979, with the Roldós-Hurtado ticket sweeping to an overwhelming 68.5 percent victory against a weak performance by Durán. Doubts persisted, however, up to the moment that the winners took office three months later, that the military would allow them to assume their duly elected offices. The size of their popular mandate and, according to political scientist John D. Martz, pressure from the administration of President Jimmy Carter in Washington made it difficult for the military to stop the "democratization" process at this late date. The military did extract as a price, in any case, unprecedented powers to name representatives to the boards of directors of major state corporations and to participate directly in the naming of the minister of defense. The outgoing government also made it clear to Roldós (who had an early campaign slogan of "we will not forgive, we will not forget") that it would not tolerate any investigation into the behavior of the military with respect to human rights. With his autonomy thus diminished, Roldós finally assumed the presidency on August 10, and thus Ecuador returned to constitutional, civilian rule after almost a decade of dictatorship.
