= Enlargement of the United Nations =

Accession of additional states to the UN

Map of the current UN member states by their years of admission 1945 (original members) 1946–1959 1960–1989 1990–present non-member observer states

As of 17 September 2026, there are 193 member states in the United Nations (UN), each of which is a member of the United Nations General Assembly.

The following is a list of United Nations member states arranged in chronological order according to their dates of admission (with the United Nations Security Council resolutions that recommended their admission and the United Nations General Assembly resolutions that admitted them, signified with SCR and GAR, respectively), including former members. Members denoted with "→" changed their names, had their memberships in the UN continued by a successor state, merged with other members, or were dissolved.

== Timeline ==
=== 1940s ===
==== 1945 (original members) ====
The UN officially came into existence on 24 October 1945, after ratification of the United Nations Charter by the five permanent members of the United Nations Security Council (China, France, the Soviet Union, the United Kingdom, and the United States) and a majority of the other signatories. A total of 51 original members (or founding members) joined that year; 50 of them signed the Charter at the United Nations Conference on International Organization in San Francisco on 26 June 1945, while Poland, which was not represented at the conference, signed it on 15 October 1945.

24 October 1945

- /Argentina
- Belarus (seat held by the /Byelorussian Soviet Socialist Republic → renamed //Belarus in 1991)
- ///Brazil
- Chile
- China (seat held by the Republic of China [on mainland (1912–1949) and on Taiwan (1949–present)] → seat transferred to the People's Republic of China in 1971)
- / Cuba
- Czechoslovakia (seat held by Third Czechoslovak Republic → Czechoslovak Socialist Republic → Czech and Slovak Federative Republic) → dissolved (current UN members that formerly comprised Czechoslovakia: Czech Republic and Slovakia)
- Denmark
- Dominican Republic
- Egypt → United Arab Republic (period when merged with Syria) → /Arab Republic of Egypt
- El Salvador
- France (seat held by the Provisional Government of the French Republic → became the French Fourth Republic → reconstituted as the /French Fifth Republic in 1958)
- //Haiti
- /Imperial State of Iran → Islamic Republic of Iran
- /Lebanon
- Luxembourg
- Dominion of New Zealand → New Zealand
- /Nicaragua
- ////Paraguay
- Commonwealth of the Philippines → Third Republic of the Philippines → Philippines under Martial Law → Fourth Republic of the Philippines → Fifth Republic of the Philippines
- Poland (Provisional Government of National Unity) → Republic of Poland → Polish People's Republic → Third Polish Republic
- /Saudi Arabia
- /Soviet Union (Union of Soviet Socialist Republics) → /Russian Federation (successor state)
- First Syrian Republic → Second Syrian Republic → United Arab Republic (period when merged with Egypt) → Syrian Arab Republic → Ba'athist Syria → Syria (transitional government)
- Turkey
- Ukraine (seat held by the /Ukrainian Soviet Socialist Republic → renamed to /Ukraine in 1991)
- United Kingdom of Great Britain and Northern Ireland
- //United States of America
- Democratic Federal Yugoslavia → Federal People's Republic of Yugoslavia → Socialist Federal Republic of Yugoslavia → dissolved (would-be successor state Federal Republic of Yugoslavia was de facto suspended from the United Nations by SCR 777 and GAR 47/1; current UN members that formerly comprised Yugoslavia: Bosnia and Herzegovina, Croatia, Montenegro, North Macedonia, Serbia, and Slovenia)

25 October 1945

- Kingdom of Greece → /Hellenic Republic

30 October 1945

- India → Dominion of India → Republic of India

31 October 1945

- Peru

1 November 1945

- Australia

2 November 1945

- Costa Rica
- Liberia

5 November 1945

- Colombia

7 November 1945

- /Mexico
- Union of South Africa → //South Africa

9 November 1945

- //Canada

13 November 1945

- Ethiopian Empire → Derg → People's Democratic Republic of Ethiopia → Transitional Government of Ethiopia → /Federal Democratic Republic of Ethiopia
- Panama

14 November 1945

- Republic of Bolivia → Plurinational State of Bolivia

15 November 1945

- / Republic of Venezuela → /Bolivarian Republic of Venezuela

21 November 1945

- Guatemala

27 November 1945

- Norway

10 December 1945

- Netherlands

17 December 1945

- ///Honduras

18 December 1945

- Uruguay

21 December 1945

- /Ecuador
- Kingdom of Iraq → / Iraqi Republic → / Ba'athist Iraq → //Iraq

27 December 1945

- Belgium

==== 1946 ====
19 November 1946 (all by SCR 8 and GAR 34)

- Kingdom of Afghanistan → Republic of Afghanistan → /Democratic Republic of Afghanistan → Islamic State of Afghanistan → /Islamic Republic of Afghanistan
- Iceland
- Sweden

16 December 1946

- Siam (SCR 13, GAR 101) → Thailand

==== 1947 ====
30 September 1947 (all by SCR 29 and GAR 108)

- Dominion of Pakistan → Islamic Republic of Pakistan
- Mutawakkilite Kingdom of Yemen → North Yemen → Yemen (unified state after merging with South Yemen)

==== 1948 ====
19 April 1948

- Union of Burma (SCR 45, GAR 188) → Socialist Republic of the Union of Burma → Union of Myanmar → Myanmar

==== 1949 ====
11 May 1949

- Israel (SCR 69, GAR 273)

=== 1950s ===
==== 1950 ====
28 September 1950

- Indonesia (SCR 86, GAR 491)

==== 1955 ====
14 December 1955 (all by SCR 109 and GAR 995)

- Albania → /Republic of Albania
- Austria
- //Bulgaria → Republic of Bulgaria
- Cambodia → Khmer Republic → Cambodia → Democratic Kampuchea → Coalition Government of Democratic Kampuchea → Cambodia
- /Ceylon → Sri Lanka
- Finland
- /Hungary (application addressed in 1947 by SCR 24) → Hungary
- Ireland
- //Italy (application addressed in 1947 by SCR 25)
- Jordan
- Laos → Lao People's Democratic Republic
- Libya → / Libyan Arab Republic → Libyan Arab Jamahiriya → Libya
- Nepal → Federal Democratic Republic of Nepal
- Second Republic of Portugal → Third Republic of Portugal
- Romanian People's Republic → Socialist Republic of Romania → Romania
- Spain → //Kingdom of Spain

==== 1956 ====
12 November 1956

- Sudan (SCR 112, GAR 1110) → Republic of the Sudan
- Morocco (SCR 115, GAR 1111)
- Tunisia (SCR 116, GAR 1112)

18 December 1956

- /Japan (SCR 121, GAR 1113)

==== 1957 ====
8 March 1957

- Dominion of Ghana → //Ghana (SCR 124, GAR 1118)

17 September 1957

- Federation of Malaya (SCR 125, GAR 1134) → Malaysia

==== 1958 ====
22 February 1958

- Egypt and Syria merge to become the United Arab Republic

12 December 1958

- Guinea (SCR 131, GAR 1325)

=== 1960s ===
==== 1960 ====
20 September 1960

- Cameroun (SCR 133, GAR 1476) → Cameroon → United Republic of Cameroon → Cameroon
- Togo (SCR 136, GAR 1477)
- Malagasy Republic (SCR 140, GAR 1478) → Madagascar
- Somalia (SCR 141, GAR 1479)
- //Democratic Republic of Congo (SCR 142, GAR 1480) → Zaire → //Democratic Republic of the Congo
- Dahomey (SCR 147, GAR 1481) → People's Republic of Benin → Benin
- Niger (SCR 148, GAR 1482)
- Upper Volta (SCR 149, GAR 1483) → Burkina Faso
- Ivory Coast (SCR 150, GAR 1484) → Côte d'Ivoire
- Chad (SCR 151, GAR 1485)
- Congo (SCR 152, GAR 1486) → People's Republic of the Congo → Republic of the Congo
- Gabon (SCR 153, GAR 1487)
- Central African Republic (SCR 154, GAR 1488) → Central African Empire → Central African Republic
- /Cyprus (SCR 155, GAR 1489)

28 September 1960

- Senegal (SCR 139 and SCR 158, GAR 1490)
- Mali (SCR 139 and SCR 159, GAR 1491)

7 October 1960

- Nigeria (SCR 160, GAR 1492)

==== 1961 ====
27 September 1961

- Sierra Leone (SCR 165, GAR 1623)

27 October 1961

- Mongolian People's Republic (SCR 166, GAR 1630) → /Mongolia
- /Mauritania (SCR 167, GAR 1631)

14 December 1961

- Tanganyika (SCR 170, GAR 1667) → United Republic of Tanzania (after merging with Zanzibar)

==== 1962 ====
18 September 1962

- /Rwanda (SCR 172, GAR 1748)
- ///Burundi (SCR 173, GAR 1749)
- Jamaica (SCR 174, GAR 1750)
- Trinidad and Tobago → Trinidad and Tobago (SCR 175, GAR 1751)

8 October 1962

- Algeria (SCR 176, GAR 1754)

25 October 1962

- /Uganda (SCR 177, GAR 1758)

==== 1963 ====
14 May 1963

- Kuwait (GAR 1872)

16 December 1963

- Sultanate of Zanzibar (SCR 184, GAR 1975) → / People's Republic of Zanzibar → merged with Tanganyika (now United Republic of Tanzania)
- Kenya (SCR 185, GAR 1976)

==== 1964 ====
1 December 1964

- //Malawi (SCR 195, General Assembly decision)
- State of Malta → Malta (SCR 196, General Assembly decision)
- /Zambia (SCR 197, General Assembly decision)

==== 1965 ====
20 January 1965

- Indonesia withdraws from the United Nations

21 September 1965

- The Gambia (SCR 200, GAR 2008)
- Maldives (SCR 212, GAR 2009)
- Singapore (SCR 213, GAR 2010)

==== 1966 ====
20 September 1966

- Guyana (SCR 223, GAR 2133)

28 September 1966

- Indonesia rejoins the United Nations

17 October 1966

- Botswana (SCR 224, GAR 2136)
- //Lesotho (SCR 225, GAR 2137)

9 December 1966

- Barbados (SCR 230, GAR 2175)

==== 1967 ====
14 December 1967

- South Yemen (SCR 243, GAR 2310) → merged with North Yemen (now unified state of Yemen)

==== 1968 ====
24 April 1968

- Mauritius (SCR 249, GAR 2371)

24 September 1968

- Swaziland (SCR 257, GAR 2376) → Eswatini

12 November 1968

- Equatorial Guinea (SCR 260, GAR 2384)

=== 1970s ===
==== 1970 ====
13 October 1970

- Dominion of Fiji → Fiji (SCR 287, GAR 2622)

==== 1971 ====
21 September 1971

- Bhutan (SCR 292, GAR 2751)
- //Bahrain (SCR 296, GAR 2752)
- Qatar (SCR 297, GAR 2753)

7 October 1971

- /Oman (SCR 299, GAR 2754)

25 October 1971

- China's seat at the United Nations transferred from the Republic of China to the People's Republic of China. (GAR 2758)

9 December 1971

- United Arab Emirates (SCR 304, GAR 2794)

==== 1973 ====
18 September 1973

- Federal Republic of Germany (SCR 335, GAR 3050) → Germany (unified state after accession of German Democratic Republic)
- German Democratic Republic (SCR 335, GAR 3050) → acceded to Federal Republic of Germany (now unified state of Germany)
- The Bahamas (SCR 336, GAR 3051)

==== 1974 ====
17 September 1974

- Bangladesh (SCR 351, GAR 3203)
- Grenada (SCR 352, GAR 3204)
- Guinea-Bissau (SCR 356, GAR 3205)

==== 1975 ====
16 September 1975

- /Cape Verde (SCR 372, GAR 3363)
- São Tomé and Príncipe (SCR 373, GAR 3364)
- // People's Republic of Mozambique (SCR 374, GAR 3365) → Mozambique

10 October 1975

- Papua New Guinea (SCR 375, GAR 3368)

12 November 1975

- Comoros, State of (SCR 376, GAR 3385) → //Federal and Islamic Republic of Comoros → Union of the Comoros

4 December 1975

- Suriname (SCR 382, GAR 3413)

==== 1976 ====
21 September 1976

- //Seychelles (SCR 394, GAR 31/1)

1 December 1976

- People's Republic of Angola (SCR 397, GAR 31/44) → Republic of Angola

15 December 1976

- Western Samoa (SCR 399, GAR 31/104) → Samoa

==== 1977 ====
20 September 1977

- Djibouti (SCR 412, GAR 32/1)
- Vietnam (SCR 413, GAR 32/2)

==== 1978 ====
19 September 1978

- Solomon Islands (SCR 433, GAR 33/1)

18 December 1978

- ///Dominica (SCR 442, GAR 33/107)

==== 1979 ====
18 September 1979

- /Saint Lucia (SCR 453, GAR 34/1)

=== 1980s ===
==== 1980 ====
25 August 1980

- Zimbabwe (SCR 477, GAR S-11/1)

16 September 1980

- //Saint Vincent and the Grenadines (SCR 464, GAR 35/1)

==== 1981 ====
15 September 1981

- Vanuatu (SCR 489, GAR 36/1)

25 September 1981

- /Belize (SCR 491, GAR 36/3)

11 November 1981

- Antigua and Barbuda (SCR 492, GAR 36/26)

==== 1983 ====
23 September 1983

- Saint Kitts and Nevis (SCR 537, GAR 38/1)

==== 1984 ====
21 September 1984

- Brunei Darussalam (SCR 548, GAR 39/1)

=== 1990s ===
==== 1990 ====
23 April 1990

- Namibia (SCR 652, GAR S-18/1)

18 September 1990

- Liechtenstein (SCR 663, GAR 45/1)

==== 1991 ====
17 September 1991

- / Democratic People's Republic of Korea (SCR 702, GAR 46/1)
- // Republic of Korea (SCR 702, GAR 46/1)
- Federated States of Micronesia (SCR 703, GAR 46/2)
- Marshall Islands (SCR 704, GAR 46/3)
- Estonia (SCR 709, GAR 46/4)
- Latvia (SCR 710, GAR 46/5)
- /Lithuania (SCR 711, GAR 46/6)

==== 1992 ====
2 March 1992

- //Kazakhstan (SCR 732, GAR 46/224)
- Armenia (SCR 735, GAR 46/227)
- //Kyrgyzstan (SCR 736, GAR 46/225)
- Uzbekistan (SCR 737, GAR 46/226)
- /Tajikistan (SCR 738, GAR 46/228)
- Moldova (SCR 739, GAR 46/223)
- ///Turkmenistan (SCR 741, GAR 46/229)
- /Azerbaijan (SCR 742, GAR 46/230)
- /San Marino (SCR 744, GAR 46/231)

22 May 1992

- Croatia (SCR 753, GAR 46/238)
- Slovenia (SCR 754, GAR 46/236)
- Republic of Bosnia and Herzegovina (SCR 755, GAR 46/237) → /Bosnia and Herzegovina

31 July 1992

- /Georgia (SCR 763, GAR 46/241)

==== 1993 ====
19 January 1993

- Slovakia (SCR 800, GAR 47/222)
- Czech Republic (SCR 801, GAR 47/221)

8 April 1993

- /Former Yugoslav Republic of Macedonia (SCR 817, GAR 47/225) → North Macedonia

28 May 1993

- /Eritrea (SCR 828, GAR 47/230)
- Monaco (SCR 829, GAR 47/231)

28 July 1993

- Andorra (SCR 848, GAR 47/232)

==== 1994 ====
15 December 1994

- Palau (SCR 963, GAR 49/63)

==== 1999 ====
14 September 1999

- Kiribati (SCR 1248, GAR 54/1)
- Nauru (SCR 1249, GAR 54/2)
- Tonga (SCR 1253, GAR 54/3)

=== 2000s ===
==== 2000 ====
5 September 2000

- Tuvalu (SCR 1290, GAR 55/1)

1 November 2000

- Federal Republic of Yugoslavia (SCR 1326, GAR 55/12) → Serbia and Montenegro → /Serbia (successor state)

==== 2002 ====
10 September 2002

- Switzerland (SCR 1426, GAR 57/1)

27 September 2002

- East Timor (SCR 1414, GAR 57/3)

==== 2006 ====
28 June 2006

- Montenegro (SCR 1691, GAR 60/264)

=== 2010s ===
==== 2011 ====
14 July 2011

- South Sudan (SCR 1999, GAR 65/308)

== Summary ==
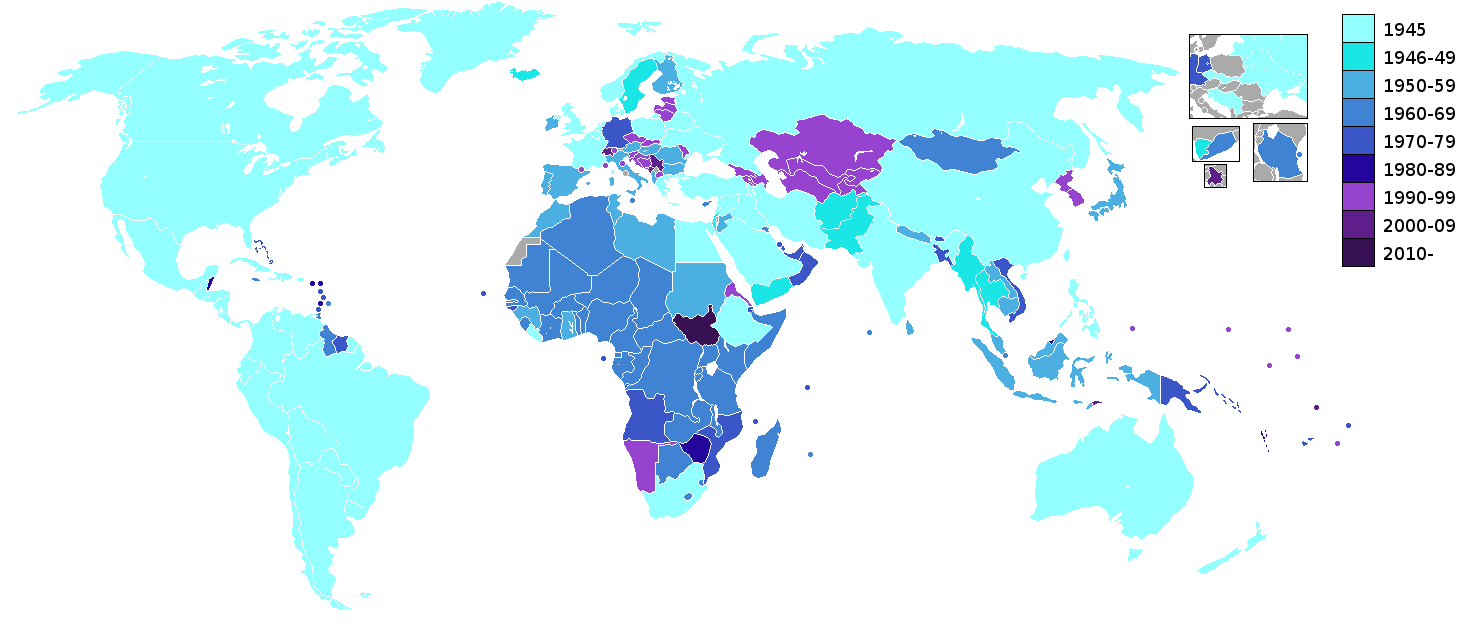
Map of the UN member states by the decade of their dates of admission (former member states shown in insets)

Below is a summary of the growth in UN membership.

Year	# of admissions	# of members
1945	51	51
1946	4	55
1947	2	57
1948	1	58
1949	1	59
1950	1	60
1951–1954	0	60
1955	16	76
1956	4	80
1957	2	82
1958	1	82
1959	0	82
1960	17	99
1961	4	104
1962	6	110
1963	3	113
1964	3	115
1965	3	117
1966	4	122
1967	1	123
1968	3	126
1969	0	126
1970	1	127
1971	5	132
1972	0	132
1973	3	135
1974	3	138
1975	6	144
1976	3	147
1977	2	149
1978	2	151
1979	1	152
1980	2	154
1981	3	157
1982	0	157
1983	1	158
1984	1	159
1985–1989	0	159
1990	2	159
1991	7	166
1992	13	179
1993	6	184
1994	1	185
1995–1998	0	185
1999	3	188
2000	2	189
2001	0	189
2002	2	191
2003–2005	0	191
2006	1	192
2007–2010	0	192
2011	1	193
2012–present	0	193

== See also ==
- Enlargement of the African Union and enlargement of the European Union
- Holy See of Vatican City and State of Palestine in the Palestinian territories, the two UN General Assembly non-member observer states
- Sovereign Military Order of Malta
- Abkhazia, the Republic of China or Taiwan, Kosovo, Northern Cyprus, Somaliland, South Ossetia, Transnistria, and Western Sahara's Sahrawi Arab Democratic Republic
- List of sovereign states
- Member states of the United Nations

== Notes ==
1. Egypt and Syria merged to form the United Arab Republic on 22 February 1958. They resumed as separate UN members on 13 October 1961 after Syria resumed its status as an independent state.
2. Tanganyika and Zanzibar merged to form the United Republic of Tanganyika and Zanzibar on 26 April 1964, which later changed its name to the United Republic of Tanzania.
3. Indonesia temporarily withdrew from the UN on 20 January 1965. It announced its intention "to resume full cooperation with the United Nations and to resume participation in its activities" on 19 September 1966, and was invited to rejoin the UN on 28 September 1966.
4. Yemen and Democratic Yemen merged on 22 May 1990, see Yemeni unification for details.
5. The German Democratic Republic acceded to the Federal Republic of Germany on 3 October 1990, see German reunification for details.
6. Czechoslovakia ceased to be a UN member on 1 January 1993 after its dissolution into the Czech Republic and Slovakia, see Dissolution of Czechoslovakia for details.
7. Yugoslavia (referring to the Socialist Federal Republic of Yugoslavia), effectively dissolved by 1992, was removed from the official roster of UN members in 2000 following the admission of Bosnia and Herzegovina, Croatia, Slovenia, Macedonia, and the Federal Republic of Yugoslavia (name later changed to Serbia and Montenegro) as new UN members. For details see Breakup of Yugoslavia and Yugoslav Wars.
8. China, officially known then as the Republic of China (ROC) was a founding member of the UN and a permanent member of the Security Council with veto power. In 1949, the ROC government led by the Kuomintang (KMT) lost the Chinese Civil War and retreated to the island of Taiwan. The Chinese Communist Party (CCP) then established the People's Republic of China (PRC) on the Chinese mainland. As such, the political status of the ROC (alongside the territories currently under ROC jurisdiction) are in dispute. Constitutionally, both the ROC and the PRC continue to claim to be the sole legitimate government of the entirety of China (including Taiwan). In 1971, the PRC replaced the ROC as the legitimate representative of "China" at the UN. The ROC was subsequently expelled from the UN and its organs. Since then, attempts to rejoin the UN were blocked by the PRC and the ROC was forced to use other designations in other international organizations such as the name "Chinese Taipei" in the International Olympic Committee.
9. Afghanistan's UN seat was retained by the deposed Islamic Republic government as the Taliban-led Islamic Emirate government, who controls all of Afghan territory, remains unrecognized.
