= United Nations Security Council Resolution 821 =

UN Security Council Resolution 821
- Flag of the Federal Republic of Yugoslavia (Serbia and Montenegro)
- Date: 28 April 1993
- Meeting no.: 3,204
- Code: S/RES/821 (Document)
- Subject: Federal Republic of Yugoslavia
- Voting summary: 13 voted for; None voted against; 2 abstained
- Result: Adopted

Security Council composition
- Permanent members: China; France; Russia; United Kingdom; United States
- Non-permanent members: Brazil; Cape Verde; Djibouti; Hungary; Japan; Morocco; New Zealand; Pakistan; Spain; Venezuela

United Nations Security Council resolution 821, adopted on 28 April 1993, after reaffirming Resolution 713 (1991) and all subsequent resolutions, the council also recalled resolutions 757 (1992), 777 (1992) and United Nations General Assembly Resolution 47/1 (1992) which stated that the state formerly known as the Socialist Federal Republic of Yugoslavia had ceased to exist and that the Federal Republic of Yugoslavia (Serbia and Montenegro) should apply for membership in the United Nations, until which the latter would not participate in the General Assembly.

Resolution 821 stated that the Federal Republic of Yugoslavia (Serbia and Montenegro) could not automatically continue the membership of the former Socialist Federal Republic of Yugoslavia in the United Nations, and therefore recommended to the General Assembly that it decide that the Federal Republic of Yugoslavia (Serbia and Montenegro) shall not participate in the work of the United Nations Economic and Social Council, deciding to consider the matter again before the end of the 47th session of the General Assembly.

The resolution was approved by 13 votes to none, with two abstentions from China and Russia.

The General Assembly passed the recommendation on 5 May 1993 as Resolution 47/229.

== See also ==
- United Nations Security Council Resolution 1326
- Breakup of Yugoslavia
- List of United Nations Security Council Resolutions 801 to 900 (1993–1994)
- Succession of states
- Yugoslav Wars
- List of United Nations Security Council Resolutions related to the conflicts in former Yugoslavia
