= United Nations Security Council Resolution 1326 =

UN Security Council Resolution 1326
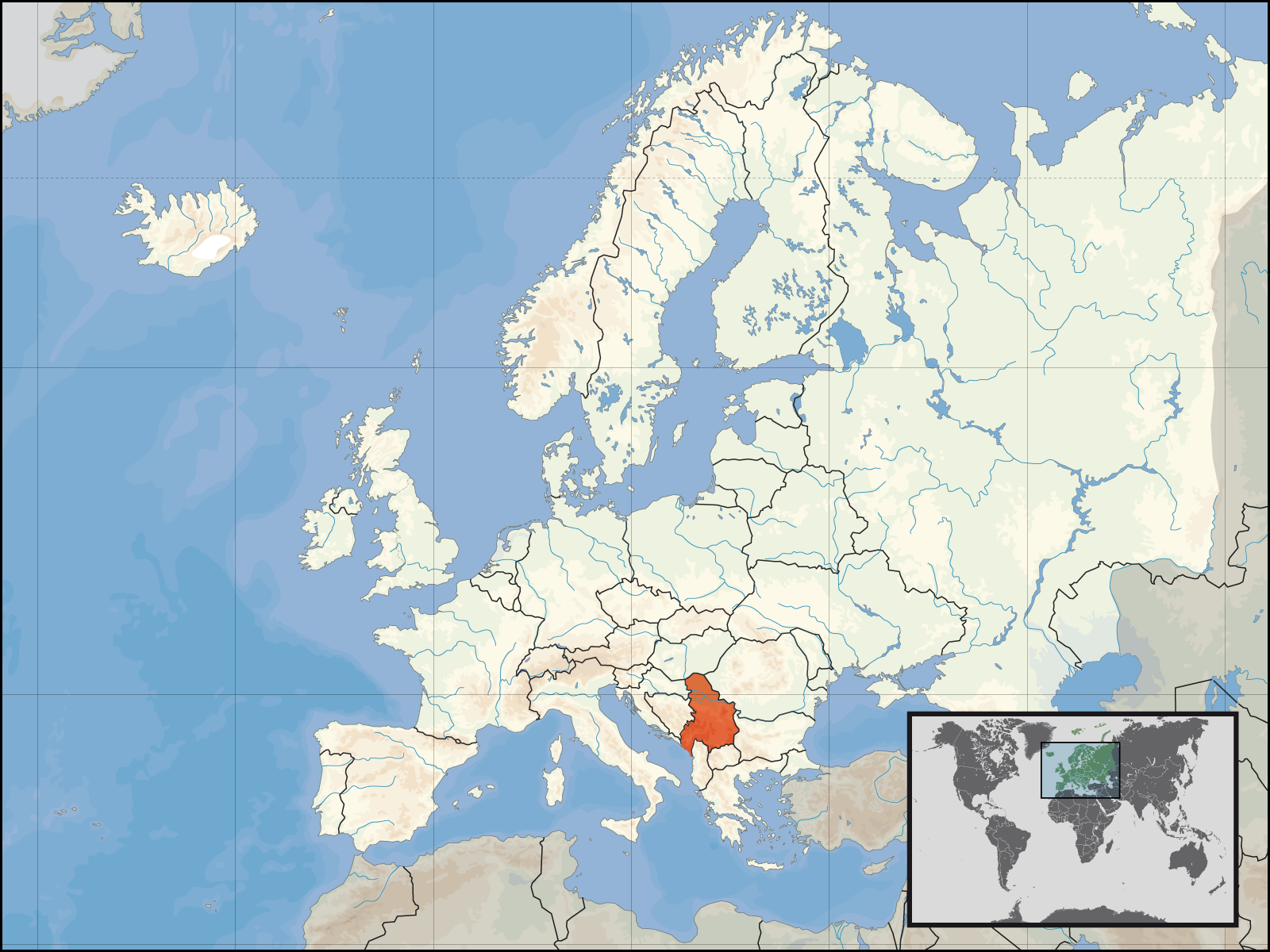
- Federal Republic of Yugoslavia (2000)
- Date: 31 October 2000
- Meeting no.: 4,215
- Code: S/RES/1326 (Document)
- Subject: Admission of new Members to the UN: Federal Republic of Yugoslavia
- Result: Adopted

Security Council composition
- Permanent members: China; France; Russia; United Kingdom; United States
- Non-permanent members: Argentina; Bangladesh; Canada; Jamaica; Malaysia; Mali; Namibia; Netherlands; Tunisia; Ukraine

United Nations Security Council resolution 1326, adopted without a vote on 31 October 2000, after examining the application of Federal Republic of Yugoslavia for membership in the United Nations, the Council recommended to the General Assembly that Yugoslavia be admitted.

In 2003, the Federal Republic of Yugoslavia was continued as the State Union of Serbia and Montenegro. After Montenegro became independent in 2006, the United Nations membership of Serbia and Montenegro was continued by the Republic of Serbia, while the Republic of Montenegro was admitted as a new member-state. Thus, Serbia is the successor state to Serbia and Montenegro (and so the Federal Republic of Yugoslavia) in the United Nations.

== See also ==
- Breakup of Yugoslavia
- Enlargement of the United Nations
- Member states of the United Nations
- List of United Nations Security Council Resolutions 1301 to 1400 (2000–2002)
- United Nations Security Council Resolution 757
- United Nations Security Council Resolution 777
- United Nations General Assembly Resolution 47/1
- United Nations Security Council Resolution 821
