= United Nations Security Council Resolution 17 =

United Nations Security Council resolution

UN Security Council Resolution 17
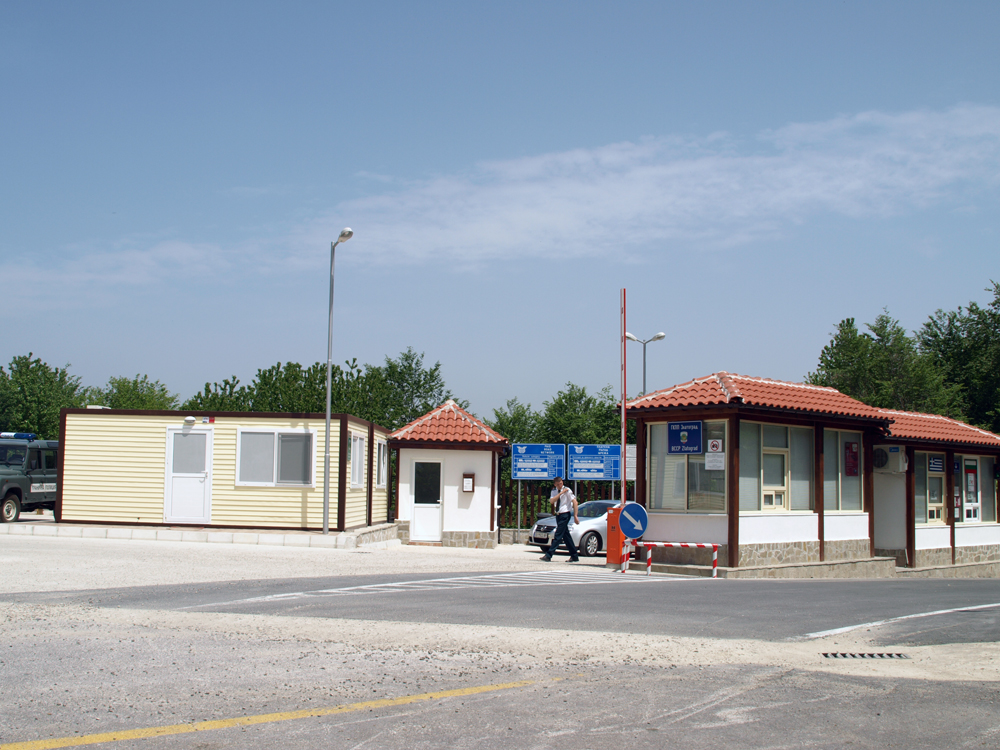
- Bulgaria-Greece border
- Date: 10 February 1947
- Meeting no.: 101
- Code: S/RES/17 (Document)
- Subject: The Greek Question
- Voting summary: 9 voted for; None voted against; 2 abstained
- Result: Adopted

Security Council composition
- Permanent members: China; France; Soviet Union; United Kingdom; United States
- Non-permanent members: Australia; Belgium; Brazil; Colombia; Poland; Syria

United Nations Security Council Resolution 17 was adopted on 10 February 1947. The Council declared that the commission established by Resolution 15 did not have the authority to request the governments of Greece, Albania, Bulgaria, or Yugoslavia to postpone any executions of political prisoners unless the commission believed they could provide testimony helpful to its work.

Resolution 17 passed with nine votes to none. Poland and the Soviet Union abstained.

== See also ==
- Albania and the United Nations
- Yugoslavia and the United Nations
- United Nations Security Council Resolution 12
- United Nations Security Council Resolution 23
- United Nations Security Council Resolution 28
- United Nations Security Council Resolution 34
