= 1974 United Nations Security Council election =

Election to the United Nations Security Council

← 1973	11 October 1974	1975 →

5 (of 10) non-permanent seats on the United Nations Security Council
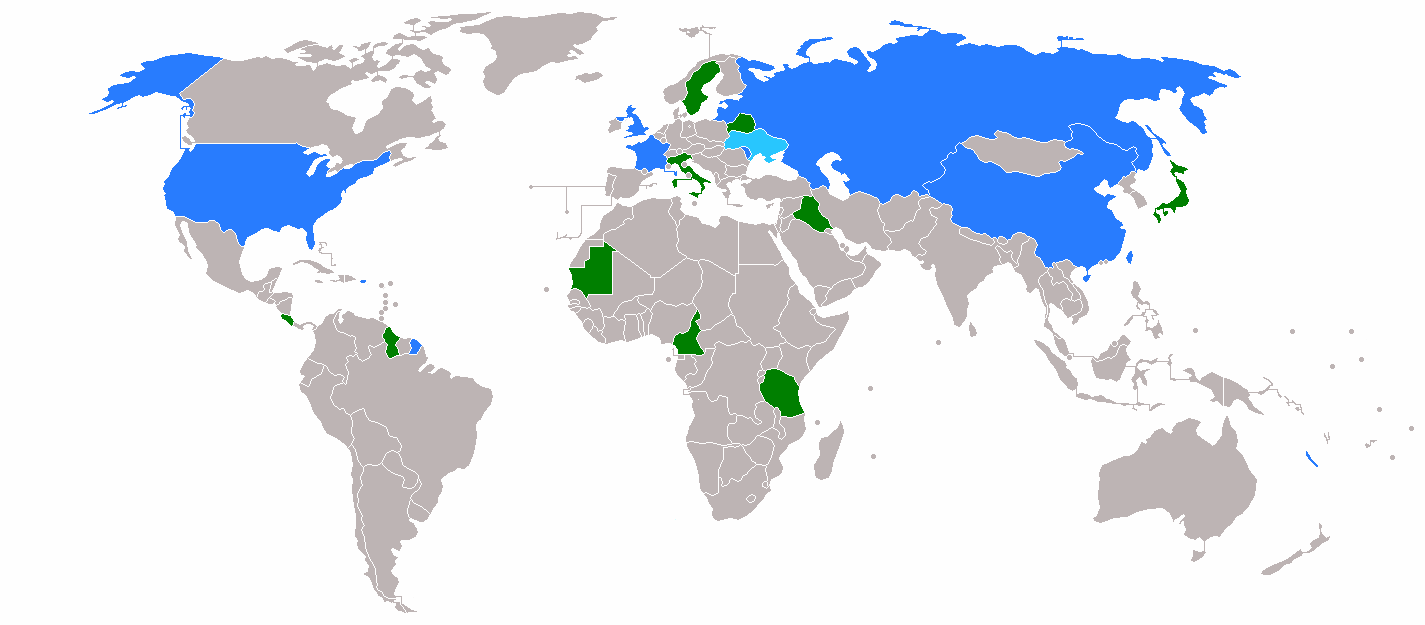
Members before election
Kenya (Africa)
Indonesia (Asia)
Peru (LatAm&Car)
Australia (WEOG)
Austria (WEOG)
New Members
Tanzania (Africa)
Japan (Asia)
Guyana (LatAm&Car)
Italy (WEOG)
Sweden (WEOG)

The 1974 United Nations Security Council election was held on 11 October 1974 during the Twenty-ninth session of the United Nations General Assembly, held at United Nations Headquarters in New York City. The General Assembly elected Guyana, Italy, Japan, Sweden, and Tanzania, as the five new non-permanent members of the UN Security Council for two-year mandates commencing on 1 January 1975. Both Guyana and Tanzania were elected to the council for the first time.

== Rules ==
The Security Council has 15 seats, filled by five permanent members and ten non-permanent members. Each year, half of the non-permanent members are elected for two-year terms. A sitting member may not immediately run for re-election.

In accordance with the rules whereby the ten non-permanent UNSC seats rotate among the various regional blocs into which UN member states traditionally divide themselves for voting and representation purposes, the five available seats are allocated as follows:

- One for African countries (held by Kenya)
- One for countries from the Asian Group (now called the Asia-Pacific Group) (held by Indonesia)
- One for Latin America and the Caribbean (held by Peru)
- Two for the Western European and Others Group (held by Australia and Austria)

To be elected, a candidate must receive a two-thirds majority of those present and voting. If the vote is inconclusive after the first round, three rounds of restricted voting shall take place, followed by three rounds of unrestricted voting, and so on, until a result has been obtained. In restricted voting, only official candidates may be voted on, while in unrestricted voting, any member of the given regional group, with the exception of current Council members, may be voted on.

== Candidates ==
As Chairman of the Latin American Group, Mr. Villagran Kramer of Guatemala stated that the candidacy of Guyana will be supported unanimously by the whole group.

== Result ==
The election was managed by then-President of the United Nations General Assembly Abdelaziz Bouteflika of Algeria. The United Nations had 139 member states at this time (for a timeline of UN membership, see Enlargement of the United Nations). Delegates were to write the names of the five member states they wished elected on the ballot papers. Voting was conducted on a single ballot. Ballots containing more states from a certain region than seats allocated to that region were invalidated.

Member	Round 1
Sweden	127
Italy	125
Guyana	123
Tanzania	122
Japan	121
Liberia	2
Bolivia	1
Brazil	1
People's Republic of the Congo	1
Cuba	1
Finland	1
India	1
Nigeria	1
Zambia	1
abstentions	0
invalid ballots	0
required majority	86
ballot papers	129

== See also ==
- List of members of the United Nations Security Council
- Japan and the United Nations
