= United Nations Security Council Resolution 1290 =

UN Security Council Resolution 1290
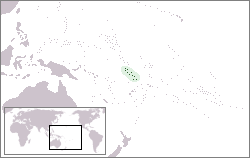
- Tuvalu
- Date: 17 February 2000
- Meeting no.: 4,103
- Code: S/RES/1290 (Document)
- Subject: Admission of new Members to the UN: Tuvalu
- Voting summary: 14 voted for; None voted against; 1 abstained
- Result: Adopted

Security Council composition
- Permanent members: China; France; Russia; United Kingdom; United States
- Non-permanent members: Argentina; Bangladesh; Canada; Jamaica; Malaysia; Mali; Namibia; Netherlands; Tunisia; Ukraine

United Nations Security Council resolution 1290 was adopted on 17 February 2000. Resolution 1290 examined Tuvalu's application to become the 189th member of the United Nations (UN). Tuvalu achieved independence in 1978 after over eighty years of British colonial rule. The country had struggled economically, and it took the 2000 sale of Tuvalu's Internet country code top-level domain .tv for the nation to be able to afford UN membership. Resolution 1290 was adopted unopposed, although China abstained due to concerns over Tuvalu's relationship with Taiwan.

== Background ==
Tuvalu is a Polynesian island country situated in the Pacific Ocean; it has a population of approximately 11,000 people (as of July 2018). Tuvalu (then known as the Ellice Islands) became a British protectorate in 1892, subject to a resident commissioner based in the Gilbert Islands. In 1916, it was incorporated into the Gilbert and Ellice Islands. Following World War II, the United Nations Special Committee on Decolonization was formed, and this committee encouraged Tuvalu to begin its process of self-determination. In 1974, the Gilbert and Ellice Islands held a referendum; as a result of the vote, the two constituent parts split. The Gilbert Islands became Kiribati and the Ellice Islands became Tuvalu. Following the referendum, Tuvalu was an individual British dependency, until it declared independence on 1 October 1978. Tuvalu continued to develop as an independent nation throughout the late twentieth century but it could not afford to apply for United Nations membership due to its weak economy. In 1998 the Tuvaluan government began discussions with the International Telecommunication Union with the aim of selecting a partner who would manage .tv, the nation's top-level Internet domain. In 2000, Tuvalu, led by Prime Minister Ionatana Ionatana, signed a deal by which the American firm DotTV exchanged US$50 million for the rights to the .tv domain. This deal essentially trebled Tuvalu's national income, and enabled the country to make its requisite United Nations contributions (Tuvalu's net contributions to the UN's 2001 regular budget were US$10,343).

== Resolution ==
On 16 November 1999, Tuvaluan Prime Minister Ionatana wrote to the United Nations Security Council (UNSC), saying that Tuvalu had met the admission requirements specified in Chapter IV of the United Nations Charter, and requesting his country's admission. On 5 January 2000, Tuvalu's membership request was officially circulated to the UNSC. Resolution 1290 was adopted on 17 February 2000 by the UNSC at its 4103rd meeting. Resolution 1290 received 14 votes in favour with none against. China abstained from the vote and said it could not approve the resolution due to Tuvalu's close relation with Taiwan. China said that Tuvaluan–Taiwanese relations contradicted United Nations General Assembly Resolution 2758. China chose not to exercise its right to veto, as it was in the interests of both China and Taiwan for Tuvalu to achieve United Nations member status. A similar situation had occurred with United Nations Security Council Resolution 1249, when Nauru's membership had been ratified despite China's abstention. On 5 September 2000, the United Nations General Assembly (UNGA) accepted the UNSC's recommendation without a vote and Tuvalu became the 189th member of the United Nations.

== See also ==
- Enlargement of the United Nations
- List of United Nations member states
- List of United Nations Security Council Resolutions 1201 to 1300
