= 1975 United Nations Security Council election =

Election to the United Nations Security Council

← 1974	20–23 October 1975	1976 →

5 (of 10) non-permanent seats on the United Nations Security Council
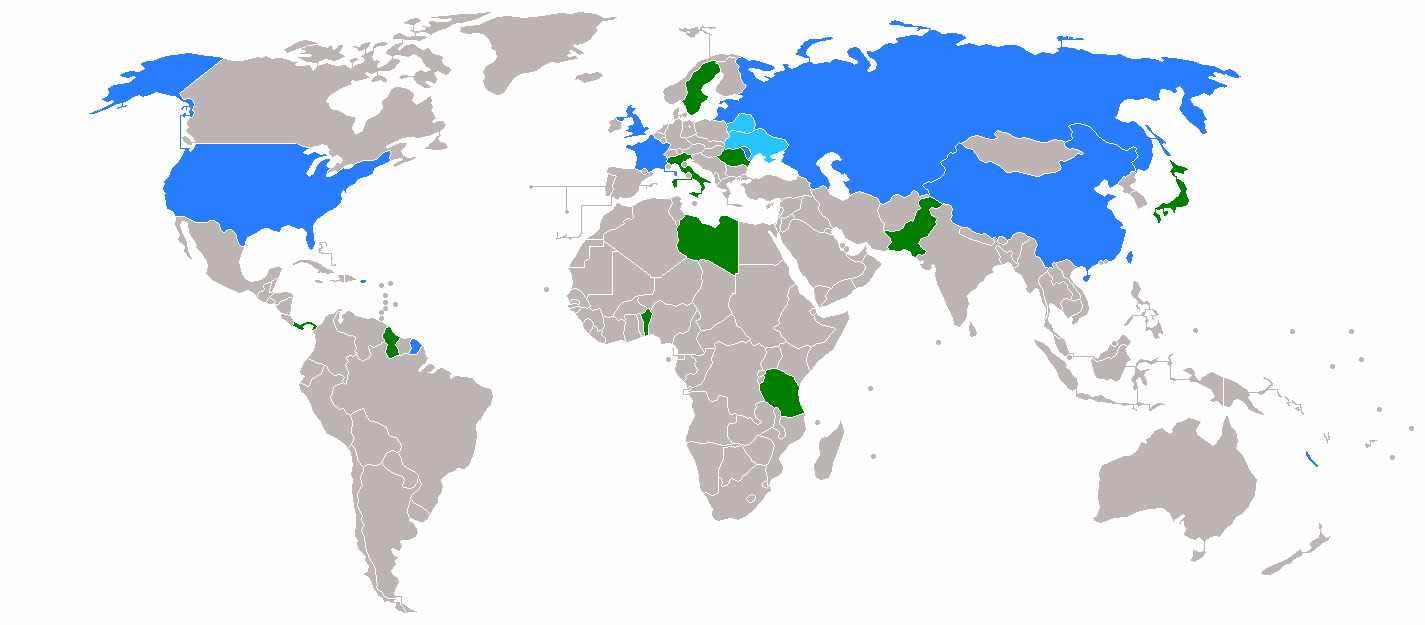
Members before election
Cameroon (Africa)
Mauritania (Africa)
Iraq (Asia, Arab)
Costa Rica (LatAm&Car)
Byelorussian SSR (E. Europe)
New Members
Dahomey (Africa)
Libya (Africa, Arab)
Pakistan (Asia)
Panama (LatAm&Car)
Romania (E. Europe)

- Unsuccessful candidates
- India (Asian Group)
- Philippines (Asian Group)

The 1975 United Nations Security Council election was held from 20 October to 23 October 1975 during the Thirtieth session of the United Nations General Assembly, held at United Nations Headquarters in New York City. The General Assembly elected Dahomey (now Benin), Libya, Pakistan, Panama, and Romania, as the five new non-permanent members of the UN Security Council for two-year mandates commencing on 1 January 1976. Benin and Libya were elected for the first time.

== Rules ==
The Security Council has 15 seats, filled by five permanent members and ten non-permanent members. Each year, half of the non-permanent members are elected for two-year terms. A sitting member may not immediately run for re-election.

In accordance with the rules whereby the ten non-permanent UNSC seats rotate among the various regional blocs into which UN member states traditionally divide themselves for voting and representation purposes, the five available seats are allocated as follows:

- Two for African countries, one of which being the "Arab Swing Seat" (held by Cameroon and Mauritania)
- One for the Asian Group (now the Asia-Pacific Group) (held by Iraq)
- One for Latin America and the Caribbean (held by Costa Rica)
- One for the Eastern European Group (held by Byelorussian SSR)

To be elected, a candidate must receive a two-thirds majority of those present and voting. If the vote is inconclusive after the first round, three rounds of restricted voting shall take place, followed by three rounds of unrestricted voting, and so on, until a result has been obtained. In restricted voting, only official candidates may be voted on, while in unrestricted voting, any member of the given regional group, with the exception of current Council members, may be voted on.

== Result ==
As Mr. Gaston Thorn of Luxembourg, then-President of the United Nations General Assembly, was absent for all three days of voting, the meetings were chaired by three different Vice-Presidents: Mr. Waldron-Ramsey of Barbados chaired the first two of the meetings on the first day, Mr. Ålgård of Norway chaired the third meeting, and Mr. Nzengeya of Zaire (today the Democratic Republic of the Congo) chaired the fourth.

The United Nations had 143 member states at this time (for a timeline of UN membership, see Enlargement of the United Nations).

Delegates were given ballot papers; they were to write the names of the five states they wished elected to the Council on them. Any ballot paper containing more than five names was declared invalid.

=== Day 1 ===
The first six rounds of balloting were held on 20 October 1983 at the 2384th and 2385th plenary meetings of the General Assembly. Dahomey, Libya, Panama, and Romania were elected in the first round, leaving only the Asian seat vacant. As India and Pakistan were the states with the highest number of votes contesting the Asian seat, in accordance with the rules, three rounds of restricted voting would commence. In these rounds, only the two states that have attained the highest number of votes in the previous round (India and Pakistan) could be voted on, any other votes would be considered invalid. After the three rounds of voting failed to provide an election, the meeting rose. Later in the day, the Assembly had the 2385th meeting, and the voting was continued with unrestricted rounds. After the first such round of voting proved inconclusive, the President motioned for a change in the schedule; before continuing the vote on the Security Council membership, the 18 members of the Economic and Social Council were elected in one round of voting. After those elections, the elections to the Security Council continued with a fifth round, which was also inconclusive. Mr. Yango of the Philippines then rose to speak and withdrew his country's candidacy. Then the President asked the Assembly on their view on the vote as to should it be continued on this date or not. Mr. Baroody of Saudi Arabia rose to speak and advised the Assembly not to delay, citing the urgency of the question of Korea and of other matters on the Assembly's agenda; a sixth round of voting commenced, also inconclusive. Then both Mr. Ramphul of Mauritius and Mr. Rios of Panama advised the President to adjourn the meeting, and once the representatives of both India and Pakistan agreed to the motion, the meeting rose.

Member	Round 1	Round 2	Round 3	Round 4	Round 5	Round 6
Romania	137	–	–	–	–	–
Dahomey	133	–	–	–	–	–
Panama	132	–	–	–	–	–
Libya	126	–	–	–	–	–
India	60	59	64	59	54	58
Pakistan	59	76	73	78	60	72
Philippines	25	–	–	–	20	–
Cuba	2	–	–	–	–	–
Argentina	1	–	–	–	–	–
Bolivia	1	–	–	–	–	–
Bhutan	–	–	–	–	1	–
Morocco	1	–	–	–	–	–
Nigeria	1	–	–	–	–	–
Papua New Guinea	–	–	–	–	–	1
Rwanda	1	–	–	–	–	–
Senegal	1	–	–	–	–	–
Sierra Leone	1	–	–	–	–	–
Venezuela	1	–	–	–	–	–
Yugoslavia	1	–	–	–	–	–
Zambia	1	–	–	–	–	–
abstentions	0	4	3	3	3	3
invalid ballots	0	1	0	0	1	1
required majority	94	90	92	92	90	88
ballot papers	140	140	140	140	139	135

=== Day 2 ===
The seventh round of voting was held on 21 October 1975 during the 2386th meeting. After this inconclusive round of voting, Mr. Baroody of Saudi Arabia rose to speak and appealed to both India and Pakistan not to agree on a one-year period each, as such precedents in similar situations were made known to him. Next to speak was Mr. Bishara of Kuwait; citing rule 76 of the rules of procedure, he motioned for an immediate adjournment of the meeting for 48 hours. He did this because he found that "this, to put it mildly, unpleasant and indeed unattractive spectacle does not redound to the prestige of this Assembly or do it honour.". The motion was put to a vote and was adopted by 124 votes for and one against, with 5 abstentions, and the meeting rose.

Member	Round 7
Pakistan	75
India	58
abstentions	4
invalid ballots	0
required majority	89
ballot papers	137

=== Day 3 ===
The eighth and final round of voting was held on 23 October 1975 during the 2387th. Mr. Bishara of Kuwait, Chairman of the Asian Group, rose to speak in his national capacity; he appealed to one of the two contesting nations to withdraw from the election. He also assured the country stepping down that Kuwait would do its utmost to get them elected in a future election. Next to speak was Mr. Adjibadé of Dahomey, who seconded Mr. Bishara in his statement, claiming that both Africa and Asia would endorse the withdrawing nation in a future election. Mr. Ortiz de Rozas of Argentina also backed the idea, stating that "the vast majority of the countries represented here share the views so eloquently set forth by the representative of Kuwait.". Mr. Hoveyda of Iran also joined the initiative, giving full support from the delegation of his country to the country stepping down. Mr. Abdel-Meguid of Egypt also joined the initiative. Next to speak was Mr. Ramphul of Mauritius, stating that the country withdrawing would not lose any prestige. Mr. Shaikhly of Iraq (the country vacating the Asian seat in the Council at the end of the year) felt that it was a special duty for his delegation to appeal to the contesting countries for one of them to withdraw. Mr. Azzout of Algeria stated his confidence that one of the two countries will withdraw. Mr. Panyarachun of Thailand joined the initiative for voluntary withdrawal and reminded the Assembly that the delegation of the Philippines has withdrawn from this election, and that when Japan would vacate its seat on the Council at the end of 1976, the Philippines would surely apply for election. Mr. Jaipal of India then withdrew the candidacy of his country, and thanked all those who would support India in a future election. Mr. Akhund of Pakistan then thanked India for withdrawing, and assured them that next time they contest a seat on the Security Council, Pakistan will give them full support. Finally, Mr. Yango of the Philippines rose to speak. He stated that, although many in the Assembly had given promises of supporting India in a future election, Asia is a big region, and any nation within it has a right to declare its candidacy. Then the vote was taken and Pakistan was elected to the Security Council.

Member	Round 8
Pakistan	123
abstentions	8
invalid ballots	5
required majority	82
ballot papers	136

== See also ==
- List of members of the United Nations Security Council
- India and the United Nations
- Pakistan and the United Nations
- Philippines and the United Nations
