= 1976 United Nations Security Council election =

Election to the United Nations Security Council

← 1975	21 October 1976	1977 →

5 (of 10) non-permanent seats on the United Nations Security Council
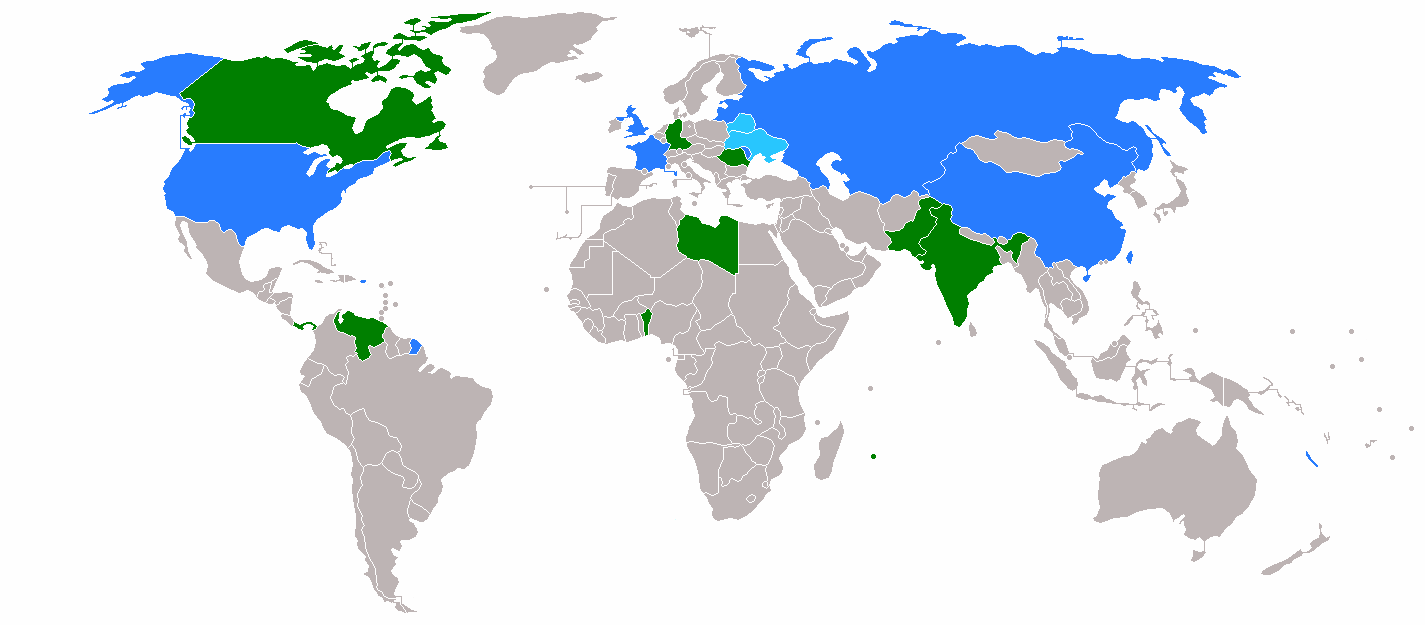
Members before election
Tanzania (Africa)
Japan (Asia)
Guyana (LatAm&Car)
Italy (WEOG)
Sweden (WEOG)
New Members
Mauritius (Africa)
India (Asia)
Venezuela (LatAm&Car)
Canada (WEOG)
West Germany (WEOG)

The 1976 United Nations Security Council election was held on 21 October 1976 during the Thirty-first session of the United Nations General Assembly, held at United Nations Headquarters in New York City. The General Assembly elected Canada, the Federal Republic of Germany, India, Mauritius, and Venezuela, as the five new non-permanent members of the UN Security Council for two-year mandates commencing on 1 January 1977. Both Mauritius and West Germany were elected members of the council for the first time.

== Rules ==
The Security Council has 15 seats, filled by five permanent members and ten non-permanent members. Each year, half of the non-permanent members are elected for two-year terms. A sitting member may not immediately run for re-election.

In accordance with the rules whereby the ten non-permanent UNSC seats rotate among the various regional blocs into which UN member states traditionally divide themselves for voting and representation purposes, the five available seats are allocated as follows:

- One for African countries (held by Tanzania)
- One for countries from the Asian Group (now called the Asia-Pacific Group) (held by Japan)
- One for Latin America and the Caribbean (held by Guyana)
- Two for the Western European and Others Group (held by Italy and Sweden)

To be elected, a candidate must receive a two-thirds majority of those present and voting. If the vote is inconclusive after the first round, three rounds of restricted voting shall take place, followed by three rounds of unrestricted voting, and so on, until a result has been obtained. In restricted voting, only official candidates may be voted on, while in unrestricted voting, any member of the given regional group, with the exception of current Council members, may be voted on.

== Result ==
The election was managed by then-President of the United Nations General Assembly Hamilton Shirley Amerasinghe of Sri Lanka. The United Nations had 146 member states at this time (for a timeline of UN membership, see Enlargement of the United Nations). Delegates were to write the names of the five member states they wished elected on the ballot papers. Voting was conducted on a single ballot. Ballots containing more states from a certain region than seats allocated to that region were invalidated.

Member	Round 1
Venezuela	136
Mauritius	134
India	132
Canada	126
West Germany	119
Finland	2
Austria	1
Belgium	1
Bhutan	1
Burundi	1
Chile	1
Cuba	1
Denmark	1
Greece	1
Iceland	1
Kenya	1
Luxembourg	1
Madagascar	1
Philippines	1
Portugal	1
Spain	1
Turkey	1
Yugoslavia	1
invalid ballots	0
abstentions	0
required majority	92
ballot papers	138

== See also ==
- List of members of the United Nations Security Council
- Canada and the United Nations
- Germany and the United Nations
- India and the United Nations
