= United Nations Security Council Resolution 15 =

United Nations Security Council resolution

UN Security Council Resolution 15
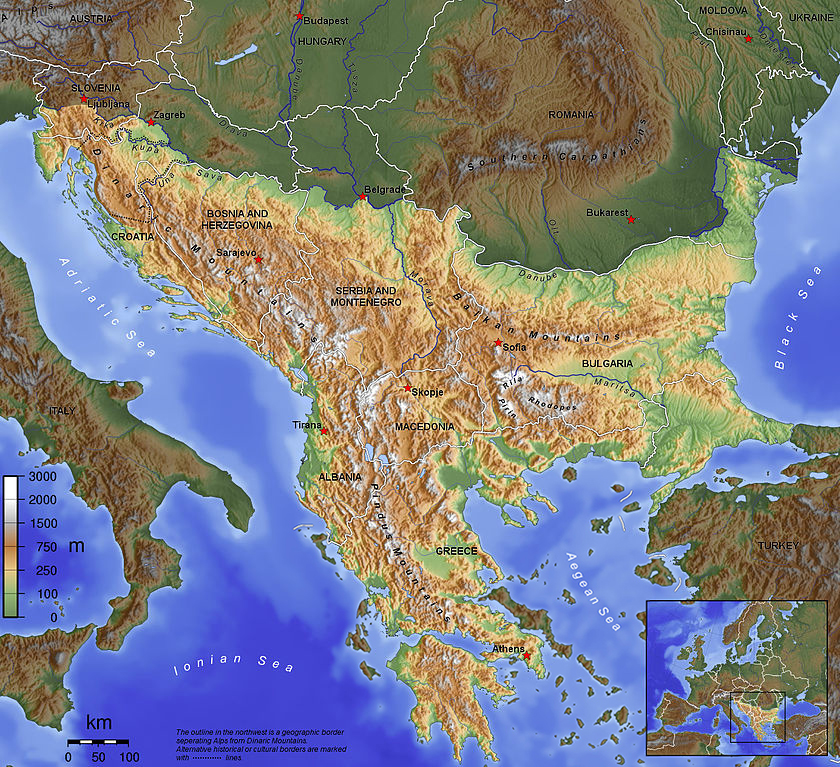
- Balkans region
- Date: 19 December 1946
- Meeting no.: 87
- Code: S/RES/15 (Document)
- Subject: Establishment of commission to investigate border violations between Greek, Albanian, Bulgarian and Yugoslavian frontiers
- Voting summary: 11 voted for; None voted against; None abstained
- Result: Adopted

Security Council composition
- Permanent members: China; France; Soviet Union; United Kingdom; United States
- Non-permanent members: Australia; Brazil; Egypt; Mexico; Netherlands; Poland

United Nations Security Council Resolution 15 was adopted unanimously on 19 December 19 1946. The Council established a commission of investigation into the alleged border violations between Greece and Albania, Bulgaria, and Yugoslavia.

== See also ==
- Albania and the United Nations
- Yugoslavia and the United Nations
- United Nations Security Council Resolution 12
- United Nations Security Council Resolution 17
- United Nations Security Council Resolution 23
- United Nations Security Council Resolution 28
- United Nations Security Council Resolution 34
