= United Nations Security Council Resolution 34 =

United Nations Security Council resolution

UN Security Council Resolution 34
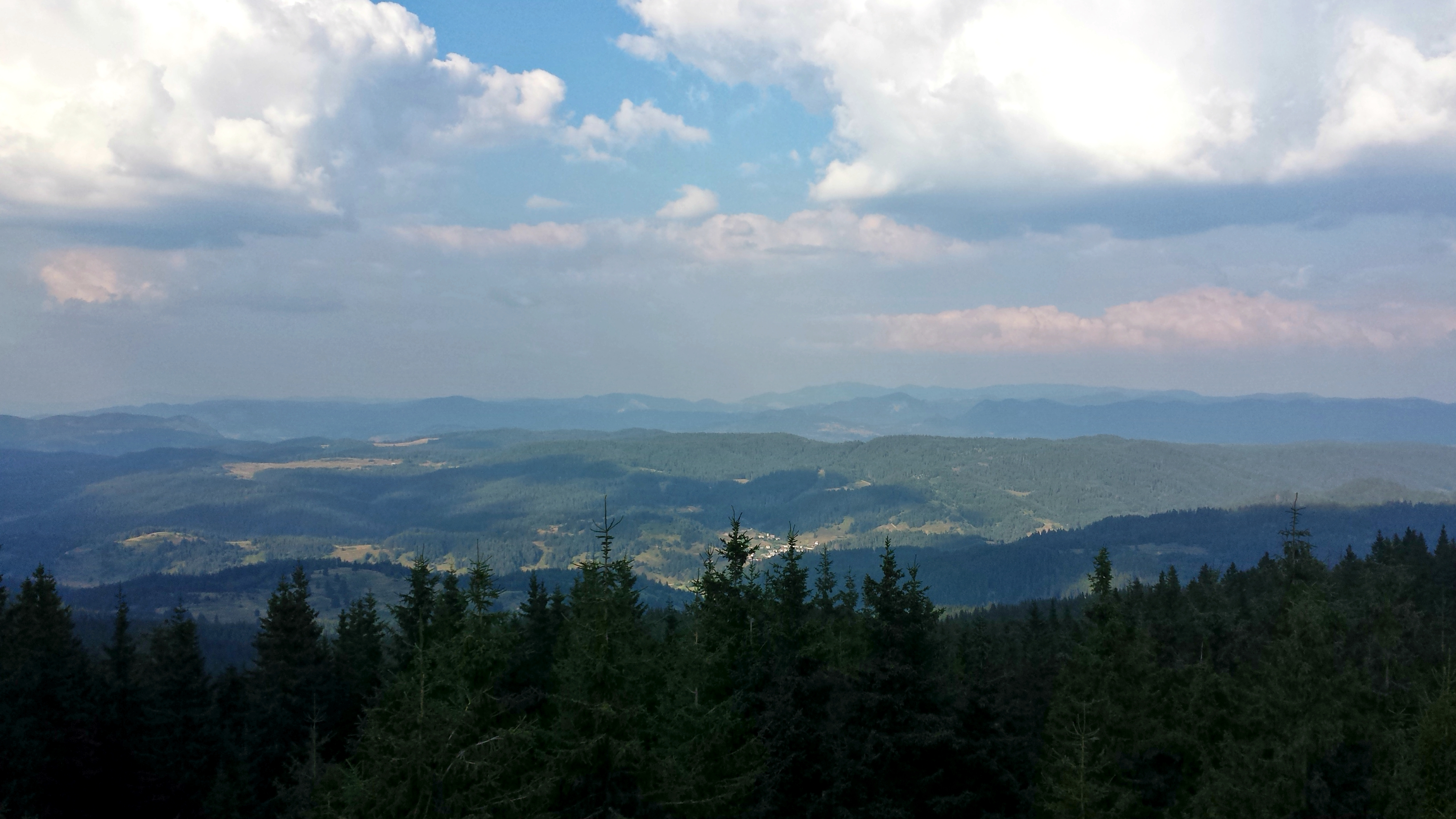
- Bulgaria-Greek border
- Date: 15 September 1947
- Meeting no.: 202
- Code: S/555 (Document)
- Subject: The Greek question
- Voting summary: 9 voted for; 2 voted against; None abstained
- Result: Adopted

Security Council composition
- Permanent members: China; France; Soviet Union; United Kingdom; United States
- Non-permanent members: Australia; Belgium; Brazil; Colombia; Poland; Syria

United Nations Security Council Resolution 34 was adopted on 15 September 1947. The Council removed the dispute between Greece and Albania, Yugoslavia, and Bulgaria from its agenda and turned over all documents related to the case to the General Assembly.

Resolution 34 passed with nine votes to two. Poland and the Soviet Union voted against. It was the first non-unanimous resolution, being adopted over a negative vote.

== Historical background ==
Resolution 34 was passed in the midst of the Greek Civil War, in which the communist states of Albania, Bulgaria, and Yugoslavia supported the Democratic Army of Greece. At one time, Bulgaria occupied a portion of Greek Macedonia. At the end of the conflict, Joseph Stalin, who wished to end the war, clashed with Josip Broz Tito, who wanted it to continue.

== See also ==
- Albania and the United Nations
- Yugoslavia and the United Nations
- List of United Nations Security Council Resolutions 1 to 100 (1946–1953)
- United Nations Security Council Resolution 12
- United Nations Security Council Resolution 15
- United Nations Security Council Resolution 17
- United Nations Security Council Resolution 23
- United Nations Security Council Resolution 28
