= United Nations Security Council Resolution 28 =

United Nations Security Council resolution

UN Security Council Resolution 28
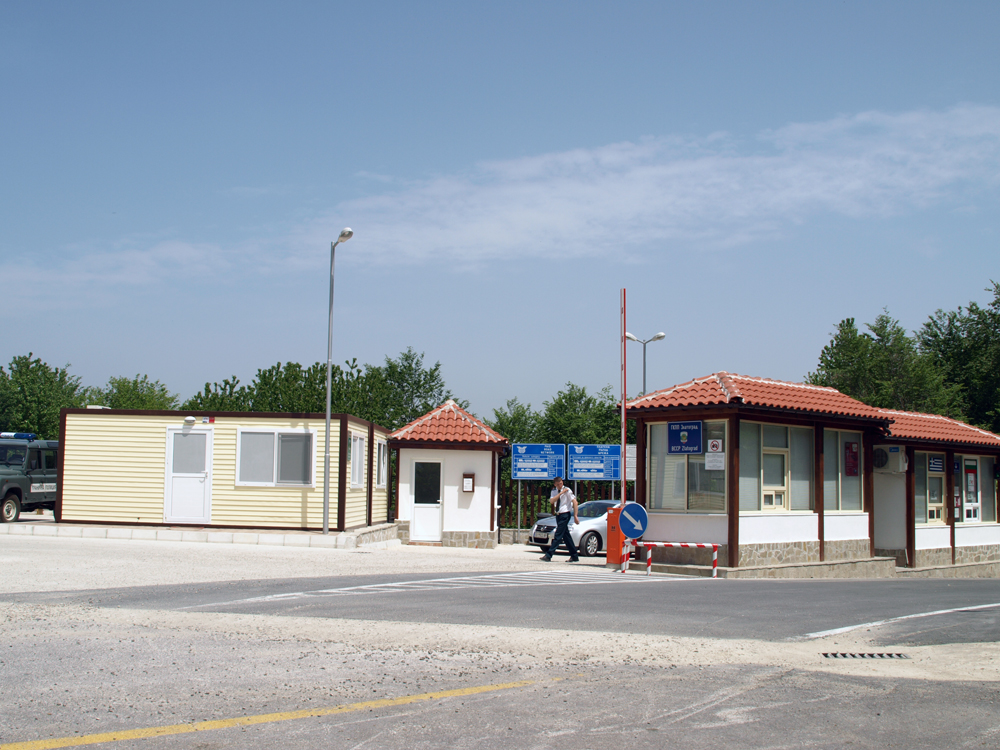
- Bulgaria-Greece border
- Date: August 6 1947
- Meeting no.: 177
- Subject: The Greek question
- Voting summary: 10 voted for; None voted against; 1 abstained
- Result: Adopted

Security Council composition
- Permanent members: China; France; Soviet Union; United Kingdom; United States
- Non-permanent members: Australia; Belgium; Brazil; Colombia; Poland; Syria

United Nations Security Council Resolution 28 was adopted on 6 August 1947. The Council formed a subcommittee of the representatives who proposed solutions for alleged border violations between Greece and Albania, Bulgaria, and Yugoslavia in order to create a new draft resolution.

Resolution 28 passed with ten votes to none. The Soviet Union abstained.

== See also ==
- Albania and the United Nations
- Yugoslavia and the United Nations
- United Nations Security Council Resolution 12
- United Nations Security Council Resolution 15
- United Nations Security Council Resolution 17
- United Nations Security Council Resolution 23
- United Nations Security Council Resolution 34
