= United Nations Security Council Resolution 12 =

United Nations Security Council resolution

UN Security Council Resolution 12
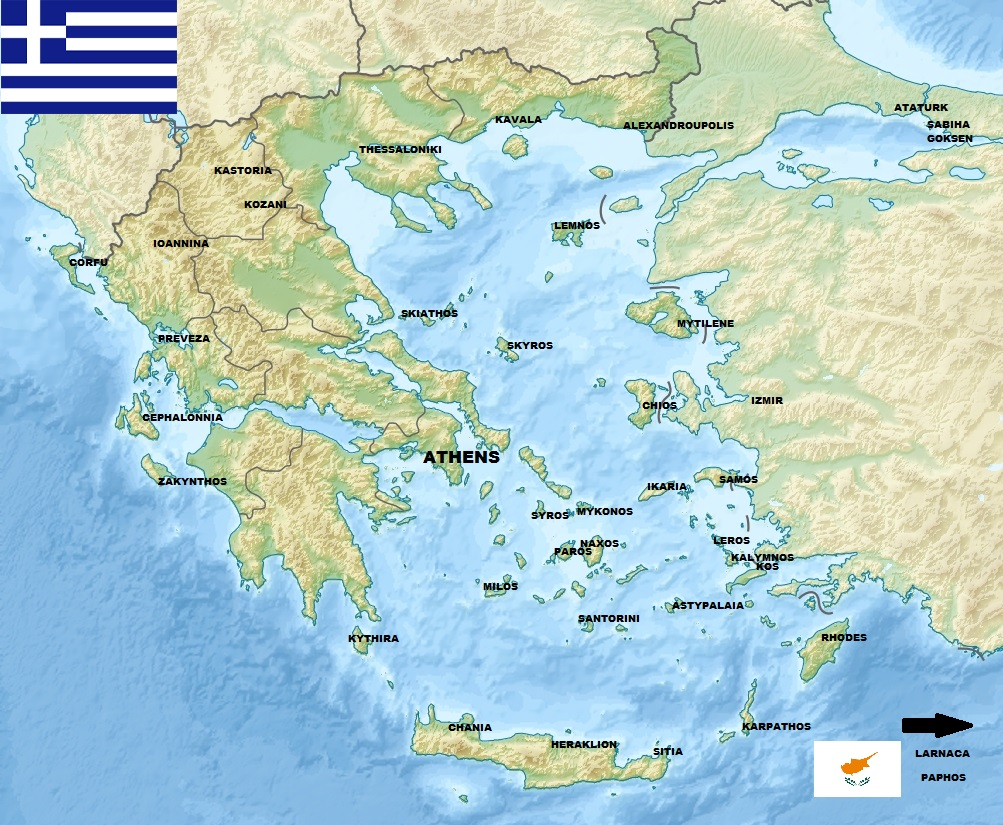
- Map of Greece
- Date: December 10 1946
- Meeting no.: 82
- Code: S/RES/12 (Document)
- Subject: The Greek Question
- Result: Adopted

Security Council composition
- Permanent members: China; France; Soviet Union; United Kingdom; United States
- Non-permanent members: Australia; Brazil; Egypt; Mexico; Netherlands; Poland

United Nations Security Council Resolution 12 was adopted on 10 December 1946. The Council invited Greece and Yugoslavia to participate in discussions surrounding allegations of British troops interfering in Greece's internal affairs. Albania and Bulgaria were invited to present declarations before the Council.

Paragraphs 1 and 2 of the resolution were adopted unanimously. Paragraph 3 was adopted by a majority vote. No vote was taken on the resolution as a whole.

== See also ==
- Albania and the United Nations
- Yugoslavia and the United Nations
- United Nations Security Council Resolution 15
- United Nations Security Council Resolution 17
- United Nations Security Council Resolution 23
- United Nations Security Council Resolution 28
- United Nations Security Council Resolution 34
