= Serbia and the United Nations =

Republic of Serbia

United Nations membership
- Represented by: Federal Republic of Yugoslavia (2000–2003); State Union of Serbia and Montenegro (2003–2006); Republic of Serbia (2006–present)
- Membership: Full member
- Since: 1 November 2000
- Former name(s): Yugoslavia (2000–2003); Serbia and Montenegro (2003–2006)
- UNSC seat: Non-permanent
- Permanent Representative: Milan Milanović

Serbia joined the United Nations on November 1, 2000, as the Federal Republic of Yugoslavia. The previous Yugoslav state was one of the original 51 member states of the United Nations.

== History ==
The Federal Republic of Yugoslavia was established on 28 April 1992 by the remaining Yugoslav republics of Montenegro and Serbia, claimed itself as the legal successor state of the former Socialist Federal Republic of Yugoslavia; however, on 30 May 1992, United Nations Security Council Resolution 757 was adopted, by which it imposed international sanctions against the Federal Republic of Yugoslavia due to its role in the Yugoslav Wars, and noted that "the claim by the Federal Republic of Yugoslavia (Serbia and Montenegro) to continue automatically the membership of the former Socialist Federal Republic of Yugoslavia in the United Nations has not been generally accepted," and on 22 September 1992, United Nations General Assembly Resolution A/RES/47/1 was adopted, by which it considered that "the Federal Republic of Yugoslavia (Serbia and Montenegro) cannot continue automatically the membership of the former Socialist Federal Republic of Yugoslavia in the United Nations," and therefore decided that "the Federal Republic of Yugoslavia (Serbia and Montenegro) should apply for membership in the United Nations and that it shall not participate in the work of the General Assembly". The Federal Republic of Yugoslavia refused to comply with the resolution for many years, but following the ousting of President Slobodan Milošević from office, it applied for membership, and was admitted to the UN on 1 November 2000. On 4 February 2003, Yugoslavia had its official name changed to Serbia and Montenegro, following the adoption and promulgation of the Constitutional Charter of Serbia and Montenegro by the Assembly of the Federal Republic of Yugoslavia.

On the basis of a referendum held on 21 May 2006, Montenegro declared independence from Serbia and Montenegro on 3 June 2006. In a letter dated on the same day, the President of Serbia informed the United Nations Secretary-General that the membership of Serbia and Montenegro in the UN was being continued by Serbia, following Montenegro's declaration of independence, in accordance with the Constitutional Charter of Serbia and Montenegro. Montenegro was admitted to the UN on 28 June 2006, with Serbia changing to its current name from Serbia and Montenegro as the continuator state.

Since United Nations Security Council Resolution 1244 in 1999, Kosovo had been administered by the UN after the end of the Kosovo war; however, on 17 February 2008, Kosovo declared independence from Serbia as the Republic of Kosovo. While the United States, the United Kingdom and France have recognized this act, Serbia and some of the international community—most notably Russia, China, Algeria, Cuba, Egypt, Bosnia and Herzegovina, Spain, India, Brazil, South Africa, Nigeria, Indonesia, Iran, Jamaica, Greece and Mexico—have not recognised Kosovo's declaration of independence. As of 2022, Kosovo has yet to become a member-state or observer-state of the United Nations.

== See also ==
- Member states of the United Nations
- Foreign relations of Serbia
- Yugoslavia and the United Nations
