= United Nations Security Council Resolution 24 =

United Nations Security Council resolution

UN Security Council Resolution 24
- Date: April 30 1947
- Meeting no.: 132
- Subject: Admission of new members to the United Nations
- Voting summary: 10 voted for; None voted against; 1 abstained
- Result: Adopted

Security Council composition
- Permanent members: China; France; Soviet Union; United Kingdom; United States
- Non-permanent members: Australia; Belgium; Brazil; Colombia; Poland; Syria

United Nations Security Council Resolution 24 was adopted on 30 April 1947. The Council deferred Hungary's application for United Nations membership to the Committee on the Admission of New Members.

Resolution 24 passed with ten votes to none. Australia abstained.

== See also ==
- United Nations Security Council Resolution 109
