= United Nations Security Council Resolution 1414 =

UN Security Council Resolution 1414
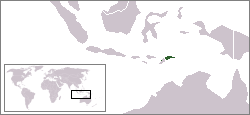
- East Timor
- Date: 23 May 2002
- Meeting no.: 4,542
- Code: S/RES/1414 (Document)
- Subject: Admission of new Members to the UN: Democratic Republic of East Timor
- Result: Adopted

Security Council composition
- Permanent members: China; France; Russia; United Kingdom; United States
- Non-permanent members: Bulgaria; Cameroon; Colombia; Guinea; Ireland; Mauritius; Mexico; Norway; Singapore; Syria

United Nations Security Council resolution 1414, adopted without a vote on 23 May 2002, after examining the application of the Democratic Republic of East Timor (Timor-Leste) for membership in the United Nations, the Council recommended to the General Assembly that East Timor be admitted.

The General Assembly later admitted East Timor to the United Nations on 27 September 2002 under Resolution 57/3.

== See also ==
- Enlargement of the United Nations
- Member states of the United Nations
- List of United Nations Security Council Resolutions 1401 to 1500 (2002–2003)
