= United Nations Security Council Resolution 213 =

United Nations Security Council resolution

UN Security Council Resolution 213
- Date: September 20 1965
- Meeting no.: 1243
- Subject: Admission of new Members to the UN: Singapore
- Voting summary: 11 voted for; None voted against; None abstained
- Result: Adopted

Security Council composition
- Permanent members: China; France; Soviet Union; United Kingdom; United States
- Non-permanent members: Bolivia; Ivory Coast; Jordan; Malaysia; Netherlands; Uruguay

United Nations Security Council Resolution 213 was adopted unanimously on September 20, 1965. It was done after examining the application of Singapore for membership in the United Nations. The Council recommended to the General Assembly that Singapore be admitted.

== See also ==
- List of United Nations Security Council Resolutions 201 to 300 (1965–1971)
