= United Nations Security Council Resolution 25 =

United Nations Security Council resolution

UN Security Council Resolution 25
- Date: May 22 1947
- Meeting no.: 137
- Subject: Admission of new members to the United Nations
- Voting summary: 10 voted for; None voted against; 1 abstained
- Result: Adopted

Security Council composition
- Permanent members: China; France; Soviet Union; United Kingdom; United States
- Non-permanent members: Australia; Belgium; Brazil; Colombia; Poland; Syria

United Nations Security Council Resolution 25 was adopted on 22 May 1947. The Council deferred Italy's application for United Nations membership to the Committee on the Admission of New Members.

Resolution 25 passed with ten votes to none. Australia abstained.

== See also ==
- United Nations Security Council Resolution 109
