= United Nations Security Council Resolution 1253 =

UN Security Council Resolution 1253
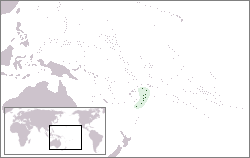
- Tonga
- Date: 28 July 1999
- Meeting no.: 4,026
- Code: S/RES/1253 (Document)
- Subject: Admission of new Members to the UN: Kingdom of Tonga
- Result: Adopted

Security Council composition
- Permanent members: China; France; Russia; United Kingdom; United States
- Non-permanent members: Argentina; Bahrain; Brazil; Canada; Gabon; Gambia; Malaysia; Namibia; Netherlands; Slovenia

United Nations Security Council resolution 1253, adopted without a vote on 28 July 1999, after examining the application of the Kingdom of Tonga for membership in the United Nations, the Council recommended to the General Assembly that Tonga be admitted, bringing total membership of the United Nations to 188.

== See also ==
- Enlargement of the United Nations
- Member states of the United Nations
- List of United Nations Security Council Resolutions 1201 to 1300 (1998–2000)
