= United Nations Security Council Resolution 1691 =

UN Security Council Resolution 1691
- Montenegro
- Date: 22 June 2006
- Meeting no.: 5,473
- Code: S/RES/1691 (Document)
- Subject: Admission of new Members to the UN: Montenegro
- Result: Adopted

Security Council composition
- Permanent members: China; France; Russia; United Kingdom; United States
- Non-permanent members: Argentina; Rep. of the Congo; Denmark; Ghana; Greece; Japan; Peru; Qatar; Slovakia; Tanzania

United Nations Security Council Resolution 1691, regarding the accession of Montenegro to the United Nations, was adopted without a vote on 22 June 2006. In the resolution, after examining the country's application for membership, the Council recommended to the General Assembly that it be admitted.

The country acceded to the United Nations on 28 June 2006 as "the Republic of Montenegro"; following the adoption of a new constitution in October 2007, this was amended to the short form "Montenegro".

== See also ==
- Enlargement of the United Nations
- List of United Nations member states
- List of United Nations Security Council Resolutions 1601 to 1700 (2005–2006)
- United Nations Security Council Resolution 1326
