= United Nations Security Council Resolution 1248 =

UN Security Council Resolution 1248
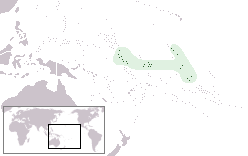
- Kiribati
- Date: 25 June 1999
- Meeting no.: 4,016
- Code: S/RES/1248 (Document)
- Subject: Admission of new Members to the UN: Republic of Kiribati
- Result: Adopted

Security Council composition
- Permanent members: China; France; Russia; United Kingdom; United States
- Non-permanent members: Argentina; Bahrain; Brazil; Canada; Gabon; Gambia; Malaysia; Namibia; Netherlands; Slovenia

United Nations Security Council resolution 1248, adopted without a vote on 25 June 1999, after examining the application of the Republic of Kiribati for membership in the United Nations, the Council recommended to the General Assembly that Kiribati be admitted, bringing total membership of the United Nations to 186.

== See also ==
- Enlargement of the United Nations
- Member states of the United Nations
- List of United Nations Security Council Resolutions 1201 to 1300 (1998–2000)
