= United Nations Security Council Resolution 1426 =

UN Security Council Resolution 1426
- Switzerland
- Date: 24 July 2002
- Meeting no.: 4,585
- Code: S/RES/1426 (Document)
- Subject: Admission of new Members to the UN: Swiss Confederation
- Result: Adopted

Security Council composition
- Permanent members: China; France; Russia; United Kingdom; United States
- Non-permanent members: Bulgaria; Cameroon; Colombia; Guinea; Ireland; Mauritius; Mexico; Norway; Singapore; Syria

United Nations Security Council resolution 1426, adopted without a vote on 24 July 2002, after examining the application of the Swiss Confederation for membership in the United Nations, the Council recommended to the General Assembly that Switzerland be admitted.

In a March 2002 referendum, the 54.6% of Swiss voters endorsed a government plan to apply for membership in the United Nations. The General Assembly later admitted Switzerland to the United Nations on 10 September 2002 under Resolution 57/1.

== See also ==
- Enlargement of the United Nations
- Member states of the United Nations
- List of United Nations Security Council Resolutions 1401 to 1500 (2002–2003)
