= United Nations Security Council Resolution 23 =

United Nations Security Council resolution

UN Security Council Resolution 23
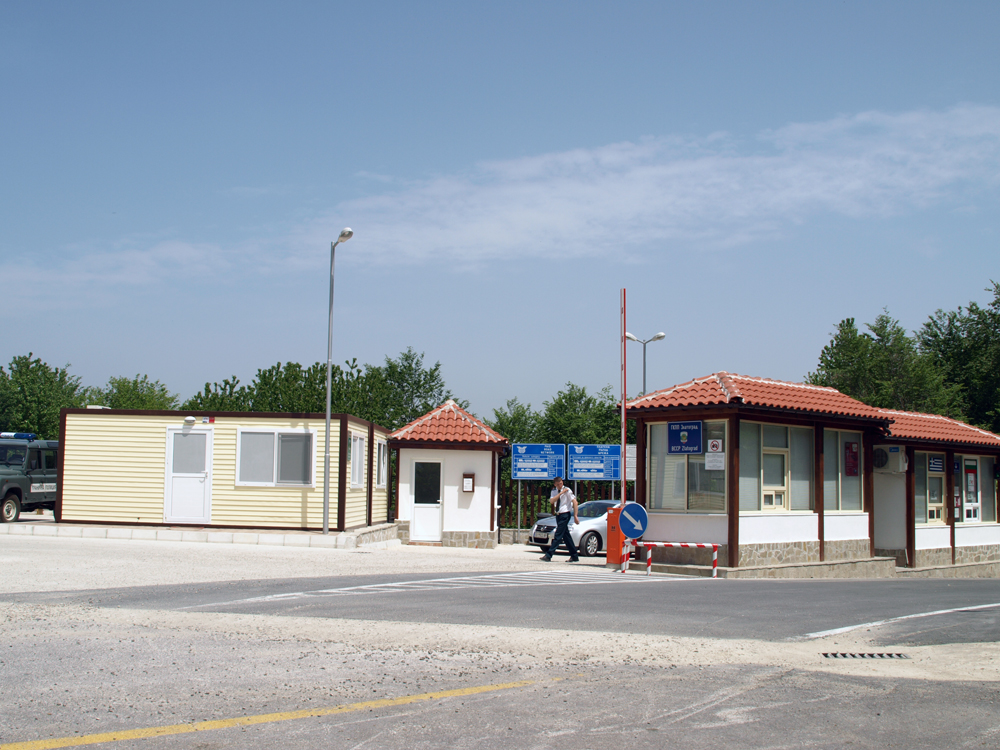
- Bulgaria-Greece border
- Date: April 18 1947
- Meeting no.: 131
- Code: S/330/Corr.1 (Document)
- Subject: The Greek question
- Voting summary: 9 voted for; None voted against; 2 abstained
- Result: Adopted

Security Council composition
- Permanent members: China; France; Soviet Union; United Kingdom; United States
- Non-permanent members: Australia; Belgium; Brazil; Colombia; Poland; Syria

United Nations Security Council Resolution 23 was adopted on 18 April 1947. The Council established a subsidiary group to assist the commission investigating the alleged border violations between Greece and Albania, Bulgaria, and Yugoslavia formed by Resolution 15.

Resolution 23 passed with nine votes to none. Poland and the Soviet Union abstained.

== See also ==
- Albania and the United Nations
- Yugoslavia and the United Nations
- United Nations Security Council Resolution 12
- United Nations Security Council Resolution 17
- United Nations Security Council Resolution 28
- United Nations Security Council Resolution 34
