= United Nations Security Council Resolution 1999 =

2011 admission of South Sudan to the United Nations

UN Security Council Resolution 1999
- South Sudan
- Date: 13 July 2011
- Meeting no.: 6,582
- Code: S/RES/1999 (Document)
- Subject: Admission of new Members to the UN: South Sudan
- Result: Adopted

Security Council composition
- Permanent members: China; France; Russia; United Kingdom; United States
- Non-permanent members: Bosnia–Herzegovina; Brazil; Colombia; Germany; Gabon; India; Lebanon; Nigeria; Portugal; South Africa

United Nations Security Council Resolution 1999 was adopted without a vote on 13 July 2011 after examining the application of the Republic of South Sudan for membership into the United Nations. The Council recommended to the General Assembly that South Sudan be admitted.

The resolution was adopted following a request from South Sudan President Salva Kiir. South Sudan became the 193rd member of the United Nations.

== See also ==
- Enlargement of the United Nations
- List of United Nations member states
- List of United Nations Security Council Resolutions 1901 to 2000 (2009–2011)
