= United Nations Security Council Resolution 6 =

United Nations Security Council resolution

UN Security Council Resolution 6
- Flag of the United Nations
- Date: 17 May 1946
- Meeting no.: 42
- Code: S/RES/6 (Document)
- Subject: Applications for membership
- Voting summary: 11 voted for; None voted against; None abstained
- Result: Adopted

Security Council composition
- Permanent members: China; France; Soviet Union; United Kingdom; United States
- Non-permanent members: Australia; Brazil; Egypt; Mexico; Netherlands; Poland

United Nations Security Council Resolution 6 was adopted unanimously on 17 May 1946. The Council set the date for reviewing applications for new member states. It was amended on 24 July due to the postponed opening date of the General Assembly.

== See also ==
- United Nations Security Council Resolution 8
- United Nations Security Council Resolution 13
