= United Nations Security Council Resolution 8 =

United Nations Security Council resolution

UN Security Council Resolution 8
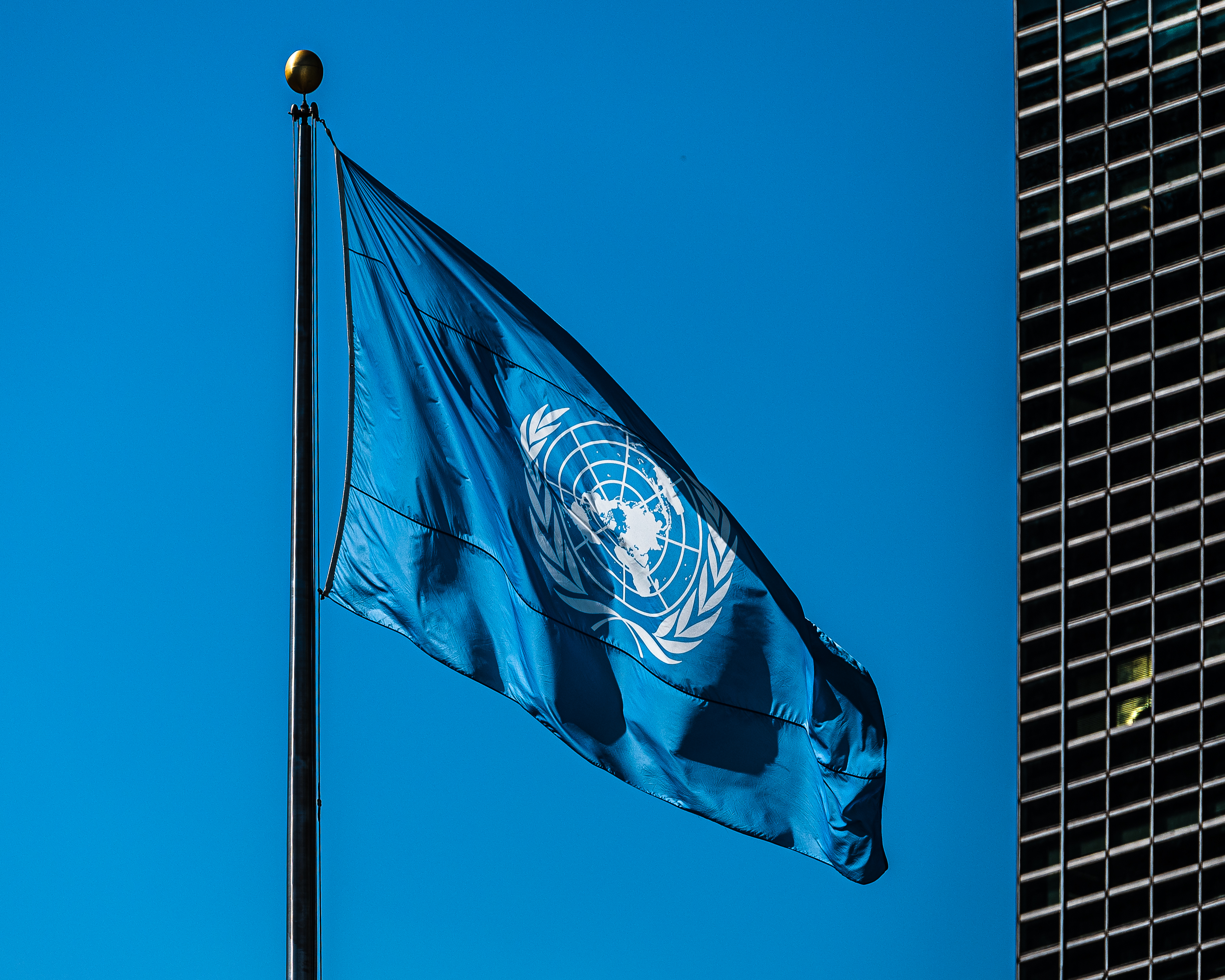
- UN flag
- Date: August 29 1946
- Meeting no.: 57
- Code: S/RES/8 (Document)
- Subject: Applications for membership
- Voting summary: 10 voted for; None voted against; 1 abstained
- Result: Adopted

Security Council composition
- Permanent members: China; France; Soviet Union; United Kingdom; United States
- Non-permanent members: Australia; Brazil; Egypt; Mexico; Netherlands; Poland

United Nations Security Council Resolution 8 was adopted on 29 August 1946.

According to Resolution 6, the Council reviewed requests for membership by Afghanistan, the People's Republic of Albania, the Hashemite Kingdom of Transjordan, Iceland, Ireland, the Mongolian People's Republic, Portugal, Siam, and Sweden. The Council recommended that the General Assembly admit Afghanistan, Iceland, and Sweden as member states.

Resolution 8 passed with ten votes to none. Australia abstained.

== See also ==
- Afghanistan and the United Nations
- Sweden and the United Nations
- United Nations Security Council Resolution 13
