= United Nations Security Council Resolution 139 =

United Nations Security Council resolution

UN Security Council Resolution 139
- Date: June 28 1960
- Meeting no.: 869
- Code: S/4357 (Document)
- Subject: Admission of new Members to the UN: Federation of Mali
- Voting summary: 11 voted for; None voted against; None abstained
- Result: Adopted

Security Council composition
- Permanent members: China; France; Soviet Union; United Kingdom; United States
- Non-permanent members: Argentina; Ceylon; Ecuador; Italy; Poland; Tunisia

United Nations Security Council Resolution 139 was adopted unanimously on June 28, 1960. After examining the application of the Federation of Mali for membership in the United Nations, the Council recommended to the General Assembly that the Federation of Mali be admitted.

After the Federation collapsed on August 20, 1960, both Senegal and Mali were admitted as Members of the United Nations under resolutions 158 and 159 respectively.

== See also ==
- List of United Nations Security Council Resolutions 101 to 200 (1953–1965)
