= United Nations Security Council Resolution 13 =

1946 UN Security Council recommendation that Thailand be admitted to the UN

UN Security Council Resolution 13
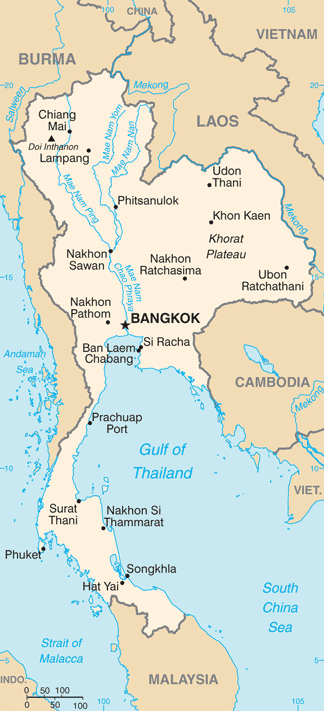
- Location of Siam (Thailand)
- Date: December 12 1946
- Meeting no.: 83
- Code: S/RES/13 (Document)
- Subject: Admission of Siam
- Voting summary: 11 voted for; None voted against; None abstained
- Result: Adopted

Security Council composition
- Permanent members: China; France; Soviet Union; United Kingdom; United States
- Non-permanent members: Australia; Brazil; Egypt; Mexico; Netherlands; Poland

United Nations Security Council Resolution 13 was adopted unanimously on 12 December 1946. The Council recommended that the General Assembly admit Siam as a member state.

Prince Wan Waithayakon became the first United Nations ambassador from the country.

== See also ==
- United Nations Security Council Resolution 6
- United Nations Security Council Resolution 8
