= United Nations Security Council Resolution 1249 =

UN Security Council Resolution 1249
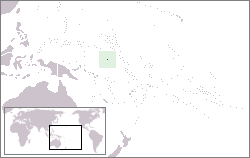
- Nauru
- Date: 25 June 1999
- Meeting no.: 4,017
- Code: S/RES/1249 (Document)
- Subject: Admission of new Members to the UN: Republic of Nauru
- Voting summary: 14 voted for; None voted against; 1 abstained
- Result: Adopted

Security Council composition
- Permanent members: China; France; Russia; United Kingdom; United States
- Non-permanent members: Argentina; Bahrain; Brazil; Canada; Gabon; Gambia; Malaysia; Namibia; Netherlands; Slovenia

United Nations Security Council resolution 1249, adopted on 25 June 1999, after examining the application of the Republic of Nauru for membership in the United Nations, the Council recommended to the General Assembly that Nauru be admitted, bringing total membership of the United Nations to 187.

Resolution 1249 was adopted by 14 votes to none against and one abstention from China which said it could not support the recommendation (due to Nauru's close diplomatic ties to Taiwan) but would not veto it in the interests of the people of both countries.

== See also ==
- Enlargement of the United Nations
- Member states of the United Nations
- List of United Nations Security Council Resolutions 1201 to 1300 (1998–2000)
