= United Nations Security Council Resolution 158 =

United Nations Security Council resolution

UN Security Council Resolution 158
- Date: September 28 1960
- Meeting no.: 907
- Code: S/4543 (Document)
- Subject: Admission of new Members to the UN: Senegal
- Voting summary: 11 voted for; None voted against; None abstained
- Result: Adopted

Security Council composition
- Permanent members: China; France; Soviet Union; United Kingdom; United States
- Non-permanent members: Argentina; Ceylon; Ecuador; Italy; Poland; Tunisia

United Nations Security Council Resolution 158, adopted unanimously on September 28, 1960, after examining the application of the Republic of Senegal for membership in the United Nations, the Council recommended to the General Assembly that the Republic of Senegal be admitted.

Senegal, along with the Republic of Mali, had been admitted under the Mali Federation under Resolution 139, until the federation broke apart on August 20, 1960.

== See also ==
- List of United Nations Security Council Resolutions 101 to 200 (1953–1965)
