= United Nations Security Council Resolution 777 =

UN Security Council Resolution 777
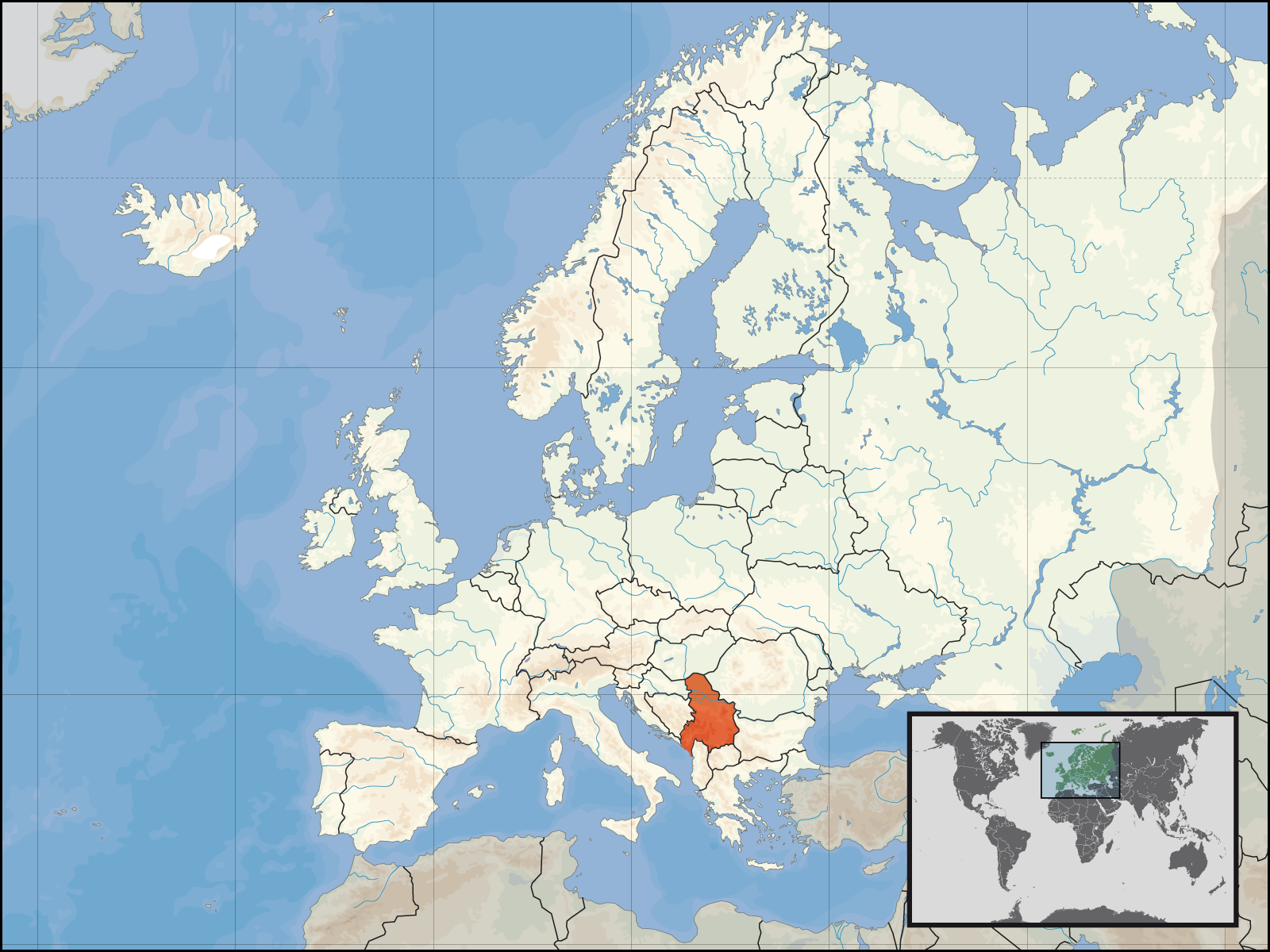
- Federal Republic of Yugoslavia
- Date: 19 September 1992
- Meeting no.: 3,116
- Code: S/RES/777 (Document)
- Subject: Federal Republic of Yugoslavia
- Voting summary: 12 voted for; None voted against; 3 abstained
- Result: Adopted

Security Council composition
- Permanent members: China; France; Russia; United Kingdom; United States
- Non-permanent members: Austria; Belgium; Cape Verde; Ecuador; Hungary; India; Japan; Morocco; Venezuela; Zimbabwe

United Nations Security Council resolution 777 was adopted unanimously on 19 September 1992. After reaffirming Resolution 713 (1992) and all subsequent resolutions on the topic, the Council considered that, as the state known as the Socialist Federal Republic of Yugoslavia (SFRY) had ceased to exist, under Resolution 757 (1992), the claim by the Federal Republic of Yugoslavia (Serbia and Montenegro) to continue automatic membership in the United Nations was not widely accepted and so determined that its claim to succeed the SFRY at the United Nations was void. Therefore, the Council recommended to the General Assembly that the Federal Republic of Yugoslavia (Serbia and Montenegro) cease participation in the General Assembly and apply for membership in the United Nations.

The original draft resolution, by the United States, recommended that the General Assembly confirm that "Yugoslavia's membership in the United Nations be extinguished"; but this was removed in order to obtain Russian support and the resolution itself remained open to interpretation. Russia and China had rejected the idea that the Federal Republic of Yugoslavia be excluded from all United Nations organs, saying that its work in the other organs would be unaffected. Meanwhile, India and Zimbabwe (traditional allies of Yugoslavia via the Non-Aligned Movement) said that Resolution 777 violated the United Nations Charter, in particular Articles 5 and 6. Previously, the suspension of apartheid-era South Africa from the General Assembly and the removal of Taiwan from the UN System, both of which India supported (Zimbabwe was not a UN member either time), had not followed the procedures outlined in Articles 5 or 6, in which action by the General Assembly is contingent on the decision of the Security Council, which had not made a recommendation either time.

The resolution, which also stated that it would consider the matter before the end of the 47th session of the General Assembly, was adopted by 12 votes to none against, while China, India and Zimbabwe abstained from voting.

On 22 September 1992, the General Assembly approved, by a majority of 127 votes in favour, 6 votes against and 26 abstentions, the decision of the Security Council in Resolution 47/1, though the text was weakened with the removal of "considering that the state formerly known as the Socialist Federal Republic of Yugoslavia has ceased to exist". From 1992 to 2000, the Federal Republic of Yugoslavia declined to re-apply for membership in the United Nations and the United Nations Secretariat allowed the mission from the SFRY to continue to operate, accrediting representatives of the Federal Republic of Yugoslavia to it which continued work in various United Nations organs.

== See also ==
- Breakup of Yugoslavia
- List of United Nations Security Council Resolutions 701 to 800 (1991–1993)
- Succession of states
- Yugoslav Wars
- List of United Nations Security Council Resolutions related to the conflicts in former Yugoslavia
