= United Nations Security Council Resolution 109 =

1955 UN Security Council recommendation that 16 various countries be admitted to the UN

UN Security Council Resolution 109
- Israel-Jordan border
- Date: December 14 1955
- Meeting no.: 705
- Code: S/3509 (Document)
- Subject: Admission of new members to the UN
- Voting summary: 8 voted for; None voted against; 3 abstained
- Result: Adopted

Security Council composition
- Permanent members: China; France; Soviet Union; United Kingdom; United States
- Non-permanent members: Belgium; Brazil; Iran; New Zealand; Peru; Turkey

United Nations Security Council Resolution 109 was adopted on December 14, 1955. After being instructed by the General Assembly to consider the applications for membership of Albania, Austria, Bulgaria, Cambodia, Ceylon, Finland, Hungary, Ireland, Italy, Jordan, Laos, Libya, Nepal, Portugal, Romania, and Spain, the Security Council recommended all 16 countries for admission to the United Nations.

The resolution was adopted 8–0 (France, Soviet Union, United Kingdom, Brazil, Peru, Iran, New Zealand, and Turkey voted in favour). Belgium, the Republic of China, and the United States abstained.

== Background ==
The circumstances leading up to the adoption of Resolution 109 were described as a deadlock, resulting from the fact that certain UN applicants were supported by the Western bloc and opposed by the Eastern bloc, and vice versa. In particular, the Western bloc supported the admission of Italy, whereas the Eastern bloc supported the admission of Bulgaria, Romania, and Hungary. The United States was the first to propose a resolution to the deadlock by considering the admission of potential member nations en bloc, or as a whole. However, it was subsequently determined by the International Court of Justice that it was inadmissible to make member state admission dependent on extraneous requirements, including the simultaneous admission of other potential member states. As a result, the text of Resolution 109 ultimately read:

"...having considered separately the applications for membership of Albania, Jordan, Ireland, Portugal, Hungary, Italy, Austria, Romania, Bulgaria, Finland, Ceylon, Nepal, Libya, Cambodia, Laos and Spain, recommends to the General Assembly the admission of the above named countries to the United Nations."

thereby complying with the ICJ's determination while procedurally voting on membership at once.

== See also ==
- Member states of the United Nations § Package deal
- List of United Nations Security Council Resolutions 101 to 200 (1953–1965)
