= United Nations General Assembly Resolution 47/1 =

UN General Assembly Resolution 47/1
- Date: September 22 1992
- Code: A/RES/47/1
- Subject: Recommendation of the Security Council of 19 September 1992
- Voting summary: 127 voted for; 6 voted against; 26 abstained
- Result: Adopted

United Nations General Assembly Resolution 47/1 was adopted on 22 September 1992 following Security Council Resolution 777. The resolution decided that the Federal Republic of Yugoslavia could not inherit the membership of the former Socialist Federal Republic of Yugoslavia but must join as a new member if it wished to participate in the United Nations.

== Background ==
During the Yugoslav Wars, after the secession of Slovenia, Croatia, Bosnia and Herzegovina, and Macedonia from the Socialist Federal Republic of Yugoslavia, in April 1992 the remaining member republics of Serbia and Montenegro reconstituted themselves together as the Federal Republic of Yugoslavia ("The new Republic").

The new Republic declared itself the successor state of the Socialist Federal Republic of Yugoslavia and claimed to continue its membership of the United Nations.

Initially US government and the European Community discussed a number of conditions related to the war in Bosnia and Herzegovina, such as the withdrawal of the Serbian army from Bosnia-Herzegovina and the facilitation of humanitarian aid.

In June 1992, James Baker (US Secretary of State) called for the expulsion of Yugoslavia from the UN as a punishment for the "outrageous, barbaric and inhuman" actions of Serb troops in Bosnia-Herzegovina. That call was part of an effort by Washington to brand Slobodan Milosevic (Serbian head of state) as an international outcast, a step that would open the door to international military intervention.

In July 1992 an arbitration commission established by the European Community deemed the new Republic a new nation and not the successor to the now-dissolved Socialist Federal Republic of Yugoslavia.

Reaffirming a number of resolutions on the subject, the Security Council, through resolution 777, considered that the nation known as the Socialist Federal Republic of Yugoslavia had ceased to exist and therefore recommended to the General Assembly to exclude the new republic from the General Assembly until it had been granted a new membership in the United Nations.

== Debate ==
At the time of the vote in the General Assembly, the Prime Minister of the new Republic Milan Panić tried to prevent the resolution from being adopted, arguing that his government was doing its utmost to stop the war. Several countries, however, concluded that even if Panic was sincere about the efforts for peace in the region, his government had been unable to control the Serbian militias in Bosnia-Herzegovina. Alia Izetbegovic, president of Bosnia-Herzegovina, said: "I do not question [Panic's] intentions to try to influence Belgrade's politics, but I doubt if he has a chance to get anything."

The resolutions established a precedent that a federation had ceased to exist where 4 out of 6 member states had left; and that the 2 remaining member states could not automatically continue the membership of the former federation.

The resolution has been incorrectly described as an "expulsion of a member of the UN", but it was not, because Serbia and Montenegro had never been a member in its own right. It had the practical effect of ending their former partial contribution as 2 of the 6 republics, through the participation exercised by the former Socialist Federal Republic of Yugoslavia. Technically it was a recognition and declaration that a state (the Federal Republic of Yugoslavia) was not a member, similar to how Resolution 2758 (XXVI) recognized the People's Republic of China as China's representative to the UN rather than formally expelling the Republic of China from the organization.

The resolutions were criticized by the Ambassador of the Federal Republic of Yugoslavia who, inter alia, quoted a letter from the Secretariat Under-Secretary-General for Legal Affairs Legal Counsel, to the Permanent Representatives of Bosnia and Herzegovina and Croatia, which opined that the resolution did not end "Yugoslavia's" membership. According to the letter, "Yugoslavia" would remain a member of the UN. Notably, the letter failed to explain how a state which no longer existed could retain its membership, or how the Secretariat could continue accrediting diplomats from the Federal Republic of Yugoslavia to the UN member "Yugoslavia" when the resolution explicitly stated that the former Yugoslavia's UN membership could not be continued by the Federal Republic of Yugoslavia.

== The resolution in brief ==
The resolution considers that the new Federal Republic of Yugoslavia can not "inherit" the UN membership of the Socialist Federal Republic of Yugoslavia and that it must therefore apply for admission to the United Nations. Likewise, the UN membership of "Yugoslavia" may not be continued automatically by it, and it cannot participate in the work of the General Assembly until it becomes a member.

A/RES/47/1 was adopted with 127 votes in favor, 6 against, 26 abstentions and 20 absences. (71% of all members, 80% of members present.)

== Voting in detail ==
In favor

Afghanistan, Albania, Antigua and Barbuda, Algeria, Argentina, Armenia, Australia, Austria, Azerbaijan, Bahrain, Bangladesh, Barbados, Belgium, Belize, Benin, Belarus, Bolivia, Bosnia and Herzegovina, Brunei, Bulgaria, Burkina Faso, Bhutan, Canada, Cape Verde, Chile, Colombia, Comoros, Congo, Costa Rica, Croatia, Cyprus, Czechoslovakia, Denmark, Djibouti, Ecuador, Egypt, El Salvador, Estonia, Fiji, Finland, France, Gabon, Gambia, Germany, Grenada, Greece, Guatemala, Guinea, Guinea-Bissau, Haiti, Honduras, Hungary, Iceland, Indonesia, Iran, Ireland, Israel, Italy, Japan, Jordan, Kazakhstan, Kuwait, Kyrgyzstan, Laos, Latvia, Liberia, Libya, Liechtenstein, Lithuania, Luxembourg, Madagascar, Malaysia, Malawi, Maldives, Mali, Malta, Marshall Islands, Mauritius, Mauritania, Micronesia, Moldova, Mongolia, Morocco, Nepal, Netherlands, New Zealand, Nicaragua, Niger, Nigeria, Norway, Oman, Panama, Pakistan, Paraguay, Peru, Philippines, Poland, Portugal, Qatar, Romania, Russian Federation, Rwanda, Saint Kitts and Nevis, Saint Vincent and the Grenadines, San Marino, Saudi Arabia, Senegal, Singapore, Slovenia, South Korea, Spain, Sudan, Sweden, Suriname, Thailand, Trinidad and Tobago, Tunisia, Turkey, Turkmenistan, Ukraine, United Arab Emirates, United Kingdom, United States, Uruguay, Vanuatu, Western Samoa, Yemen.

Against

Kenya, Swaziland, Tanzania, Yugoslavia, Zambia, Zimbabwe.

Abstentions

Angola, Bahamas, Botswana, Brazil, Burundi, Cameroon, China, Cuba, Ghana, Guyana, India, Iraq, Ivory Coast, Jamaica, Lebanon, Lesotho, Mexico, Mozambique, Myanmar, Namibia, Papua New Guinea, Sri Lanka, Togo, Uganda, Viet Nam, Zaire.

Absent

Cambodia, Central African Republic, Chad, Dominica, Dominican Republic, Equatorial Guinea, Ethiopia, Georgia, North Korea, Saint Lucia, Sao Tome and Principe, Seychelles, Sierra Leone, Solomon Islands, Somalia, South Africa, Syria, Tajikistan, Uzbekistan, Venezuela.

== Consequences ==
The Serbs reacted with rebellion and despair to resolution, with Serbian nationalists blaming Panić. Serbian leader Radovan Karadžić said the resolution had no influence over the war in Bosnia because "Yugoslavia has nothing to do with that war."

The new Federal Republic of Yugoslavia joined the UN in 2000, after fulfilling the requirements of Article 4 of the United Nations Charter:

"Membership in the United Nations is open to all other peace-loving states which accept the obligations contained in the present Charter and, in the judgment of the Organization, are able and willing to carry out these obligations.".[11]

In 2003, the new Republic was re-negotiated into a looser association between Serbia and Montenegro, and its name changed to Serbia and Montenegro. Serbia automatically continued its membership in the UN when Montenegro become independent, while Montenegro applied for membership, in accordance with the preexisting arrangements that allowed for Montenegrin independence.

== See also ==
- Breakup of Yugoslavia
- Yugoslav Wars
