= Yugoslavia and the United Nations =

Yugoslavia

United Nations membership
- Represented by: Federal People's Republic of Yugoslavia (1945–1963); Socialist Federal Republic of Yugoslavia (1963–1992)
- Membership: Former full member
- Dates: 24 October 1945 – 22 September 1992
- UNSC seat: Non-permanent

Democratic Federal Yugoslavia was a charter member of the United Nations from its establishment in 1945 until 1992 during the Yugoslav Wars. During its existence the Socialist Federal Republic of Yugoslavia played a prominent role in the promotion of multilateralism and narrowing of the Cold War divisions in which various UN bodies were perceived as important vehicles. Yugoslavia was elected a non-permanent member of the United Nations Security Council on multiple occasions in periods between 1950 and 1951, 1956, 1972–1973, and 1988–1989, which was in total 7 (out of 47) years of Yugoslav membership in the organization. The country was also one of 17 original members of the Special Committee on Decolonization.

In 1980 under the chairmanship of Ivo Margan Belgrade hosted the 21st UNESCO General Conference as the seventh host city in the world. The city also hosted the UNCTAD VI Conference in 1983. Yugoslav diplomat Stanoje Simic was one of the candidates at the 1946 United Nations Secretary-General selection, while Lazar Mojsov was 34th President of the United Nations General Assembly. Yugoslav diplomats were Presidents of the United Nations Economic and Social Council in the 1946 3rd session (Andrija Štampar, Acting), 1982 (Miljan Komatina), and from January until June 1992 (Darko Šilović). The country was one of the founding members of the Group of 77 as well as the presiding country of the group in 1985–1986.

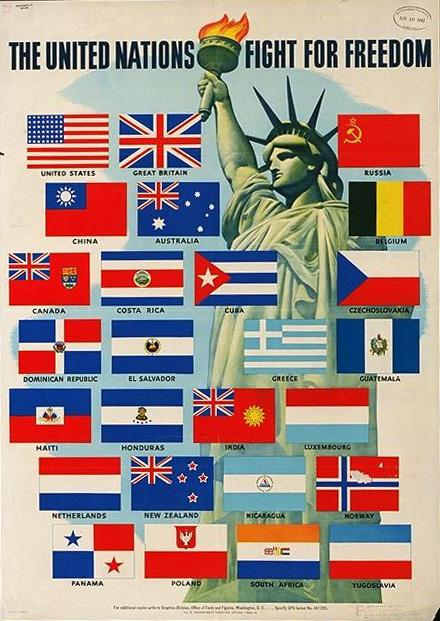
Wartime UN poster

After the breakup of Yugoslavia, its seat at the United Nations was not inherited and continued directly by any of the six federal republics due to the shared state succession acknowledged in the United Nations Security Council Resolution 777. Instead, they all applied for membership as new member states. For some time the rump Federal Republic of Yugoslavia resisted this interpretation under the objection that it alone succeeded the former Yugoslavia and ought to continue the Yugoslav seat at the UN, which was instead left vacant at the UN General Assembly. It rejoined the UN only in 2000, after the overthrow of Slobodan Milošević, as a new member state. It changed the name to the State Union of Serbia and Montenegro in 2003, and its seat was transferred to Serbia in 2006 following Montenegro's independence. UN's reaction to Yugoslav crisis included establishment of the UNPROFOR and UNCRO missions, UNTAES and UNMIK transitional administrations as well as the International Criminal Tribunal for the former Yugoslavia (ICTY). Those establishments influenced development of the United Nations peacekeeping and the establishment of the permanent International Criminal Court.

== History ==
=== Federal People's Republic of Yugoslavia / Socialist Federal Republic of Yugoslavia (1945–1992) ===
The Socialist Federal Republic of Yugoslavia disintegrated into several states starting in the early 1990s. By 2006, six UN member states existed in its former territory. Kosovo declared independence in 2008.

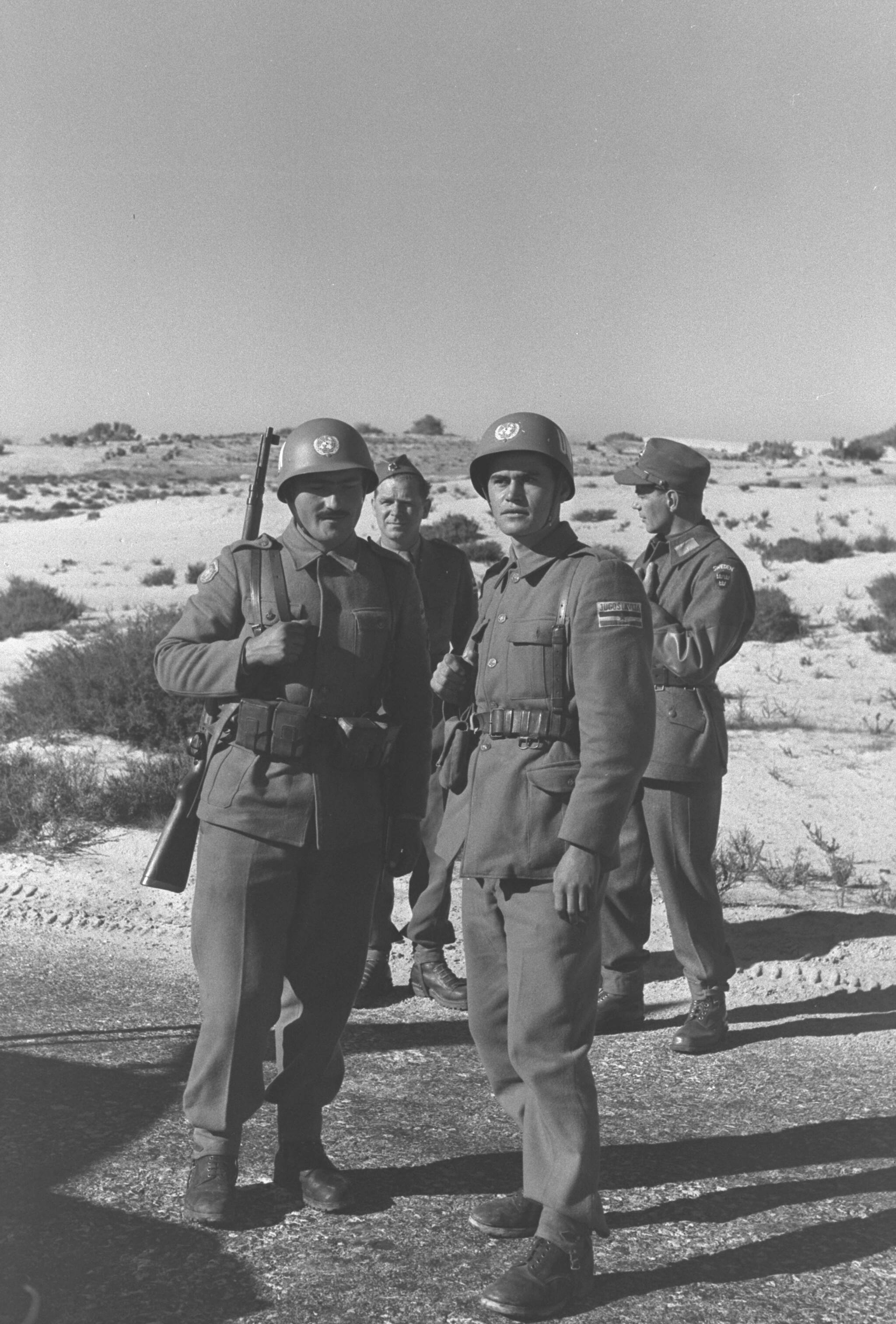
UNEF soldiers from the Yugoslav People's Army in Sinai, January 1957

Yugoslavia joined the UN as an original member on 24 October 1945. Initially part of the Cominform, Yugoslavia under the leadership of Josip Broz Tito was eventually expelled from it in a culmination of political conflict between the Soviet and Yugoslav state leaderships, known as the Tito–Stalin split. The country onwards never joined the Warsaw Pact and continued to pursue policies independent from the Soviet Bloc, and subsequently became a founding member of the Non-Aligned Movement.

It was a multi-ethnic state which Tito was able to maintain through a doctrine of "brotherhood and unity", but tensions between ethnicities began to escalate with the Croatian Spring of 1970–71, a movement for greater Croatian autonomy, which was suppressed. This was followed with favorable constitutional changes, as the 1974 Yugoslav Constitution devolved many federal powers to the constituent republics and provinces. After Tito's death in 1980 ethnic tensions grew, beginning with the 1981 protests in Albanian-majority SAP Kosovo. In the late 1980s, Serbian leader Slobodan Milošević used the Kosovo crisis to stoke up Serb nationalism and attempt to consolidate and dominate the country, which alienated the other ethnic groups.

During 1990, the communists lost power to separatist parties in the first multi-party elections held across the country, except in Serbia and Montenegro, where they were won by Milošević and his allies. Nationalist rhetoric on all sides became increasingly heated. In 1991, one republic after another proclaimed independence (only Serbia and Montenegro remained behind), but the status of Serb minorities outside Serbia was left unsolved. After a string of inter-ethnic incidents, the Yugoslav Wars ensued, first in Croatia and then, most severely, in multi-ethnic Bosnia and Herzegovina; the wars left long-term economic and political damage in the region.

In November 1991, the Arbitration Commission of the Peace Conference on Yugoslavia, led by Robert Badinter, concluded at the request of Lord Carrington that the SFR Yugoslavia was in the process of dissolution, that the Serbian population in Croatia and Bosnia did not have a right to self-determination in the form of new states, and that the borders between the republics were to be recognized as international borders. As a result of the conflict, the United Nations Security Council unanimously adopted UN Security Council Resolution 721 on 27 November 1991, which paved the way to the establishment of the United Nations Protection Force in Yugoslavia. In January 1992, Croatia and Yugoslavia signed an armistice under UN supervision, while negotiations continued between Serb and Croat leaderships over the partitioning of Bosnia and Herzegovina.

On 15 January 1992, the independence of Croatia and Slovenia was recognized worldwide. By then, the Socialist Federal Republic of Yugoslavia had been effectively dissolved into five independent states, of which four were subsequently admitted to the UN:

- Bosnia and Herzegovina, Croatia, and Slovenia were admitted to the UN on 22 May 1992.
- Macedonia was admitted to the UN on 8 April 1993, being provisionally referred to for all purposes within the UN as "The former Yugoslav Republic of Macedonia", due to pressure from Greece, pending settlement of the difference that had arisen over its name. Following the ratification of the Prespa Agreement, the country renamed itself North Macedonia on 12 February 2019.

The fifth state, the Federal Republic of Yugoslavia, claimed the right to inherit the Yugoslav seat at the UN under the legal theory that it was the legal continuation and thus the legitimate inheritor of the legal rights and obligations of the Socialist Federal Republic of Yugoslavia, but this was rejected by the other four states who insisted that all five states were valid successors rather than any one state individually. Due to this dispute, the member state "Yugoslavia", referring to the former Socialist Federal Republic of Yugoslavia, remained on the official roster of UN members for many years after its effective dissolution, including the presence of its (now-discontinued) flag at UN headquarters. Following its admission as a new UN member, the Federal Republic of Yugoslavia took the name "Yugoslavia" at the UN, while the Socialist Federal Republic of Yugoslavia was removed from the official roster of UN members.

=== Federal Republic of Yugoslavia (1992–2000) ===
Serbia and Montenegro (previously Yugoslavia)

United Nations membership
- Represented by: Federal Republic of Yugoslavia (1992–2003); State Union of Serbia and Montenegro (2003–2006)
- Membership: Former full member
- Dates: 1 November 2000 – 3 July 2006
- Former name(s): Yugoslavia (2000–2003)
- UNSC seat: Non-permanent (never elected)

In April 1992, during the breakup of Yugoslavia, the newly founded Federal Republic of Yugoslavia claimed the Yugoslav seat at the UN by state succession, like Russia had done with the Soviet Union's seat shortly before. However, the UN Security Council in Resolutions 757 and 777 denied this so-called "rump Yugolavia" the right of succession and referred the matter to the General Assembly, which passed Resolution 47/1 requiring the Federal Republic of Yugoslavia to reapply as a new member state and forbidding it to participate in the work of the General Assembly until it was readmitted. In essence, rather than terminating the membership of the Socialist Federal Republic of Yugoslavia, the United Nations declared that the former Yugoslavia ceased to exist as a state, hence there was no longer a state to inherit its membership in the UN. Accordingly, the rump Yugoslavia was deemed an entirely new state which had never been a member state and thus never legally participated in the work of the UN General Assembly in the first place. In a manner not foreseen by the UN charter, Yugoslavia was thus effectively suspended from the UN, with no right to vote or attend General Assembly meetings or functions, although its seat (with nameplate) was kept at the General Assembly and its flag, including the communist red star, continued to fly at the UN headquarters. Following a legal interpretation of the relevant resolutions by the UN legal counsel, the UN Secretariat allowed the Yugoslav mission at the UN to continue operating and began accrediting the rump Yugoslavia's representatives to it. In that capacity, these representatives would circulate documents, participate in the work of various UN committees, and attend Security Council meetings as observers. After the ousting of president Milošević in 2000 his successor Koštunica relinquished the state succession claim and rejoined the UN as a new member state.

International courts have been divided over the question whether Yugoslavia was a UN member from 1992 to 2000, often issuing contradictory rulings.

=== Serbia and Montenegro (2000–2006) ===
In 2003, the Federal Republic of Yugoslavia was reorganized into the State Union of Serbia and Montenegro. Accordingly, its name at the UN was changed from "Yugoslavia" to "Serbia and Montenegro", ending approximately 58 years of a "Yugoslavia" at the UN.

On the basis of a referendum held on 21 May 2006, Montenegro declared independence from Serbia and Montenegro on 3 June 2006. In a letter dated on the same day, the President of Serbia informed the United Nations Secretary-General that the membership of Serbia and Montenegro in the UN was being continued by Serbia, following Montenegro's declaration of independence, in accordance with the Constitutional Charter of Serbia and Montenegro. Montenegro was admitted to the UN on 28 June 2006, with Serbia becoming the sole successor state to the now-defunct State Union and changing its name at the UN to simply "Serbia".

== See also ==
- Member states of the United Nations
- International Center for Promotion of Enterprises (Ljubljana)
- Yugoslavia and the Non-Aligned Movement
- Yugoslavia and the European Economic Community
- Foreign relations of Serbia
- Serbia and the United Nations
- Montenegro in intergovernmental organizations
- Serbia in intergovernmental organizations
- Museum of Yugoslavia
- Archives of Yugoslavia
