= ARA Bahía San Blas =

Amphibious cargo ship of the Argentine Navy

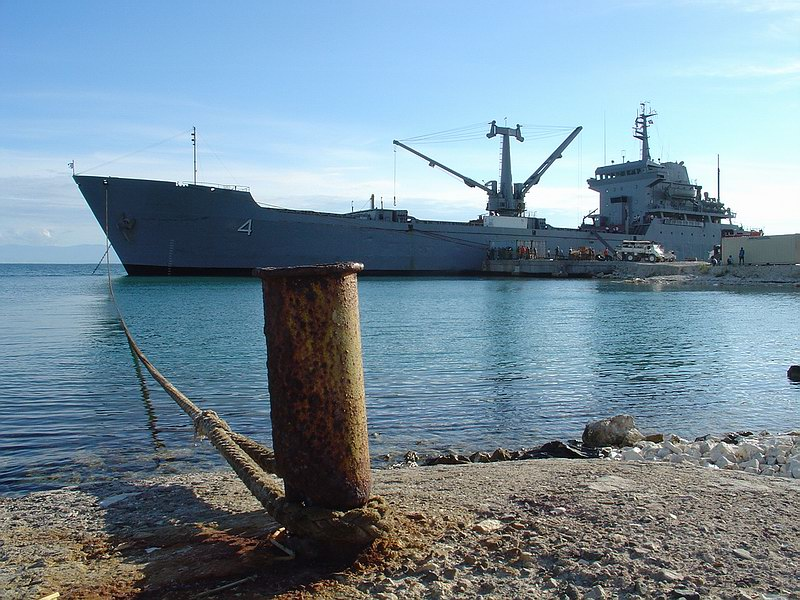
- ARA Bahia San Blas in Gonaïves, Haiti

History

Argentina
- Name: Bahía San Blas
- Namesake: San Blas Bay, Buenos Aires
- Builder: Astillero Príncipe, Menghi y Penco
- Commissioned: November 1978
- Identification: IMO number: 7529029
- Status: In service

General characteristics
- Type: Costa Sur-class (modified)
- Displacement: 10.894 Ton full load
- Length: 119.9 m (393 ft)
- Beam: 17.5 m (57 ft)
- Draught: 7.49 m (24.6 ft)
- Propulsion: 2 Diesel Sulzer 6 ZL 40/48, 6.400 hp (4.772 kW), 2 shaft
- Speed: 16 knots (30 km/h)
- Capacity: 120 containers
- Complement: 40
- Notes: cargo 9,856 m^3, 6,300 Tons

ARA Bahía San Blas is an amphibious cargo ship of the Argentine Navy, capable of unloading landing craft, troops, vehicles and cargo. She is the first Argentine Navy ship to bear the name of San Blas Bay of in the south of Buenos Aires Province.

== Design ==
Bahía San Blas (B-4) is one of three Costa Sur-class (Note: The other ships in the class are the ARA Canal Beagle and ARA Cabo de Hornos.) cargo ships ordered by the Argentine Navy in 1975, designed and built by the Argentine Príncipe, Menghi y Penco shipyard, at Buenos Aires, Argentina. The design is optimised for Patagonic coastal service.

Bahía San Blas has a steel hull and the superstructure at the stern, with a single mast and a single funnel atop, behind the bridge; the cargo area is located in the middle of the ship and three Liebherr cranes serve the three holds, one each. (Note: One 5-ton crane servers hold 1, and two 12.5-ton cranes serve holds 2 and 3; these can be used simultaneously to provide a 25-ton lifting capacity into either hold 2 or 3.) She has a bulk cargo capacity of 9,856 m^{3} (348,100 cu ft) or 6,300 tons (e.g.: coal, cereals, live cattle), and can carry up to 140 containers.

Bahía San Blas is powered by two 6-cylinder Sulzer 6 ZL 40/48 marine diesel engines of 3,200 horsepower (2,400 kW) each, driving two variable-pitch propellers; with a maximum speed of 16.5 knots (30.6 km/h; 19.0 mph).

== History ==
The ship is a Costa Sur-class vessel built at Astilleros Príncipe, Menghi y Penco at Buenos Aires in 1978 entering service on November of that year in the Transport Maritime service of the Argentine Navy. The other ships of the class are ARA Canal Beagle and ARA Cabo de Hornos.

In 1991 she was deployed to the Persian Gulf during operations Desert Shield and Desert Storm carrying humanitarian aid and providing logistic support to the Argentine warships in the area.

In 1992 Bahía San Blas transported back from the Gulf of Fonseca the four Baradero-class patrol boats used under United Nations mandate ONUCA.

After the retirement of ARA Cabo San Antonio, Bahía San Blas became the main vessel for use by the Argentine Marines receiving several modifications.

Since 2004, an Argentine contingent was deployed to Haiti under MINUSTAH mandate and Bahía San Blas has been used for logistic support making several voyages to the Caribbean island.

As of late 2016, Bahía San Blas remains in service with the Argentine Navy.
