= United Nations Security Council Resolution 719 =

UN Security Council Resolution 719
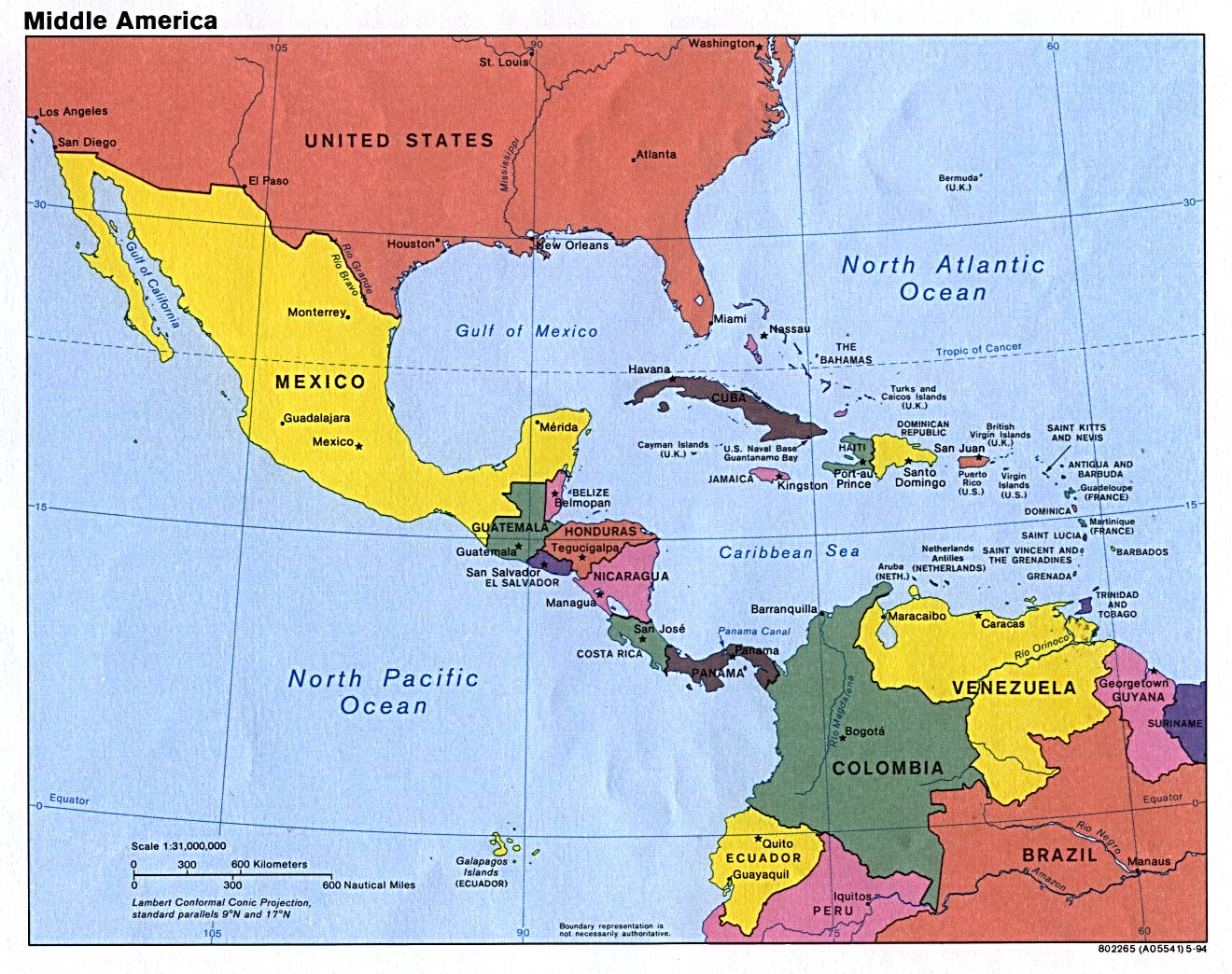
- Central America
- Date: 6 November 1991
- Meeting no.: 3,016
- Code: S/RES/719 (Document)
- Subject: Central America
- Voting summary: 15 voted for; None voted against; None abstained
- Result: Adopted

Security Council composition
- Permanent members: China; France; Soviet Union; United Kingdom; United States
- Non-permanent members: Austria; Belgium; Côte d'Ivoire; Cuba; Ecuador; India; Romania; Yemen; Zaire; Zimbabwe

United Nations Security Council resolution 719, adopted unanimously on 6 November 1991, after recalling resolutions 637 (1989), 644 (1989), 675 (1990) and 691 (1991), the Council endorsed a report by the Secretary-General and decided to extend the mandate of the United Nations Observer Group in Central America for a further five months and twenty-three days until 30 April 1992.

The resolution requested the Secretary-General to report back before the end of the current mandate on all aspects of the Observer Group, indicating if any changes regarding its future are required.

== See also ==
- History of Central America
- History of Nicaragua
- List of United Nations Security Council Resolutions 701 to 800 (1991–1993)
