= Chilean Joint Peacekeeping Operations Center =

Chilean Joint Peacekeeping Operations Centre
- Flag of Chile
- Active: 1935–present
- Country: Chile
- Allegiance: Chile
- Type: Peacekeeping
- Nickname(s): CECOPAC
- Engagements: 1935 Neutral Military Committee, the Boreal Chaco conflict 1949 up to date United Nations Military Observer Group in India and Pakistan (UNMOGIP) 1967 up to date United Nations Truce Supervision Organization (UNTSO) 1969 El Salvador-Honduras conflict (OEA Mission) 1989–1992 United Nations Observer Group in Central America ONUCA 1991–1992 United Nations Iraq-Kuwait Observation Mission (UNIKOM) 1992–1993 United Nations Transitional Authority in Cambodia (UNTAC) 1992–1995 United Nations Observer Mission in El Salvador ONUSAL 1995–1999 Military Observers Mission in the Ecuador-Peru conflict (MOMEP) 1996–1998 United Nations Special Commission (UNSCOM) 1997–2002 United Nations Mission in Bosnia and Herzegovina (UNMIBH) 2000–2002 United Nations Transitional Administration in East Timor (UNTAET) 2000–2003 United Nations Monitoring, Verification and Inspection Commission (UNMOVIC) 2000 up to date United Nations Interim Administration in Kosovo (UNMIK) 2001 up to date United Nations Peacekeeping Force in Cyprus (UNFICYP) 2002 Creation of Chilean Joint Peacekeeping Operations Centre (CECOPAC) 2002–2003 United Nations Mission of Support in East Timor, Unpol (UNMISET) 2003–2006 Department of Peacekeeping Operations (DPKO) in New York. An Army Colonel as an UN Integrated Training Deputy Director. 2003 United Nations Organization Mission in the Democratic Republic of the Congo (MONUC) 2003–2004 United Nations Assistance Mission in Afghanistan (UNAMA) 2004 up to date European Union Mission in Bosnia and Herzegovina, EUFOR-ALTHEA 2004 Multinational Interim Force in Haiti (MIFH) 2004 up to date United Nations Stabilization Mission in Haiti (MINUSTAH) 2007 up to date UN Logistics Base in Brindisi, Italy An Investigations Police Captain as a Training Service Instructor.

Commanders
- Director: Colonel Valentín Segura
- Notable commanders: Colonel Carl Marowski; Colonel Valentín Segura

The Chilean Joint Peacekeeping Operations Centre (Spanish: Centro Conjunto para Operaciones de Paz de Chile), also known as CECOPAC (Centro Conjunto para Operaciones de Paz de Chile), is a peacekeeping force led by Chile. It is the Chilean aid to the United Nations. Led by Colonel Valentín Segura, the force was pre-set in many situations, including parts of the Afghanistan War.

== Background ==
In 1935, Chile formed the Neutral Military Committee during the Boreal Chaco conflict between Bolivia and Paraguay. In 1949 to this day, Chile also joined in the United Nations mission in India and Pakistan. As a part of the UN, Chile decided to send their troops in their events as peacekeepers, not soldiers. Chile served in several other "wars" as peacekeepers following the aftermath. They were also sent to countries that were hostile environments, like Cambodia, or recently wrecked countries like Haiti. They first really did fighting when in 2003 some of their men were hired as Private security contractors. From then on, they have been continuing their work under command of Colonel Valentín Segura, who took over the post of director in 2007. Segura, who led Operation Shua Polar I in the Chilean Antarctic Territory, also served in Bosnia and Herzegovina.

== CECOPAC today ==
Formed in 2002, CECOPAC replaced the Neutral Military Committee. It serves in the Middle East, India, Pakistan, and wherever else the United Nations tend to launch their peacekeeping missions in.
