= Costa Sur-class cargo ship =

Class of three cargo ships designed and built in Argentina

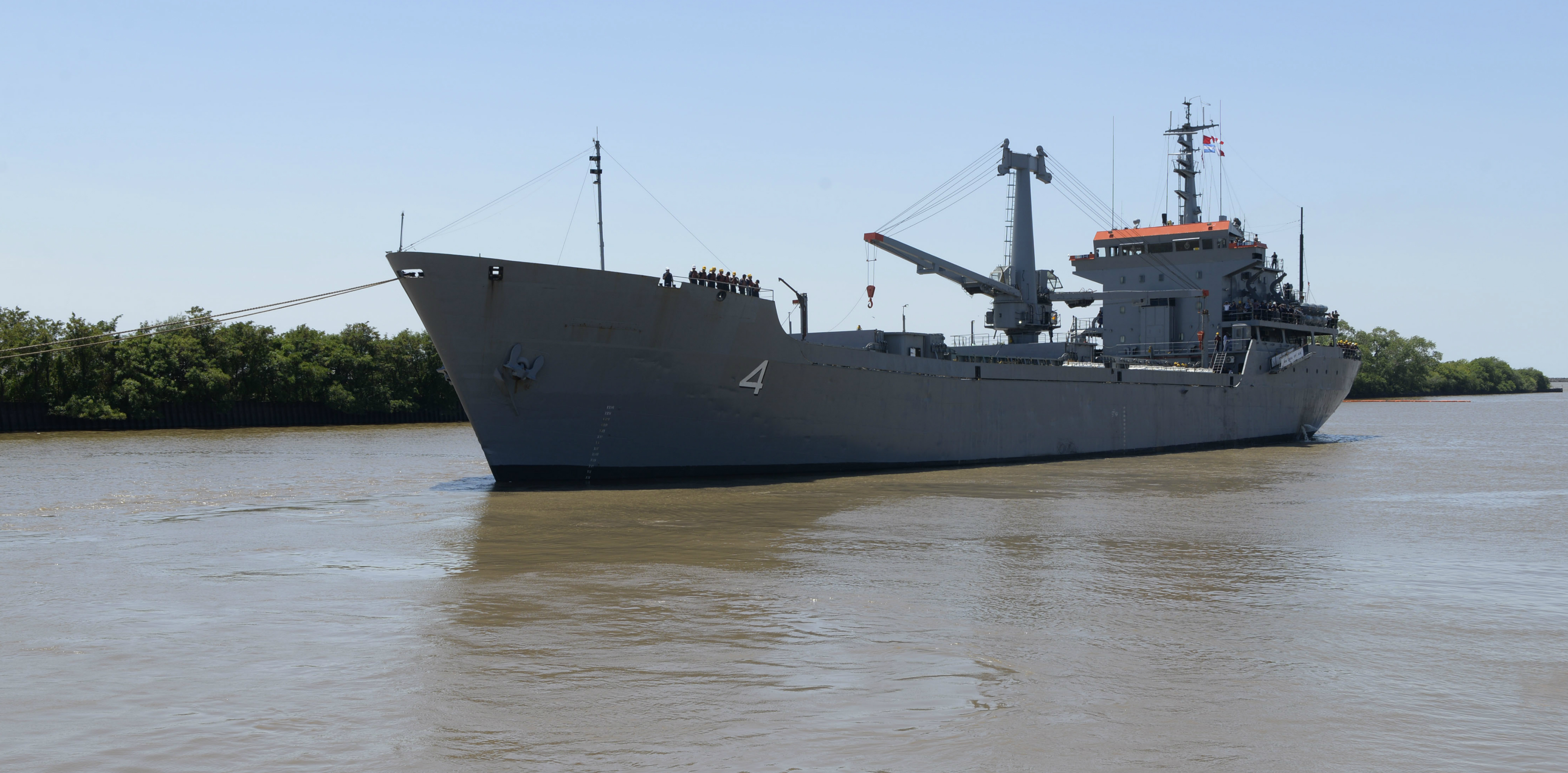
- ARA Bahía San Blas (B-4), date unknown

Class overview
- Name: Costa Sur class
- Builders: Príncipe, Menghi y Penco, Argentina
- Operators: Argentine Navy
- Built: 1977–1979
- In service: 1978–present
- In commission: 1978–present
- Planned: 3
- Completed: 3
- Active: 3

General characteristics
- Type: Cargo ship
- Displacement: 10,894 tons full load
- Length: 119.9 m (393 ft)
- Beam: 17.5 m (57 ft)
- Draught: 7.49 m (24.6 ft)
- Propulsion: 2 Sulzer 6 ZL 40/48 diesel engines, 6,400 hp (4,800 kW), 2 shaft
- Speed: 16.3 knots (30.2 km/h) max; 12 knots (22 km/h) cruise
- Capacity: bulk cargo: 9,700 m^{3} (340,000 cu ft) or 6,800 tons; refrigerated cargo: 210 m^{3} (7,400 cu ft)
- Complement: 40
- Notes: characteristics from Argentine Navy official website.

The Costa Sur-class cargo ship is a class of three cargo ships designed and built in Argentina in 1975–1979 for servicing the Patagonic coast routes; capable of transporting bulk cargo, live cattle, and containers. The ships have been in service with the Argentine Navy since 1978. The class is named after the southern coastal area of Argentina which was designed to service.

== Design ==
The Costa Sur class was part of a program to replace cargo ships then in service and reaching obsolescence; three ships were ordered by the Argentine Navy in 1975, and designed and built by the Príncipe, Menghi y Penco shipyard, located in Buenos Aires, Argentina. The design is optimised for Patagonic coastal service, which sometimes require them to beach on the shore.

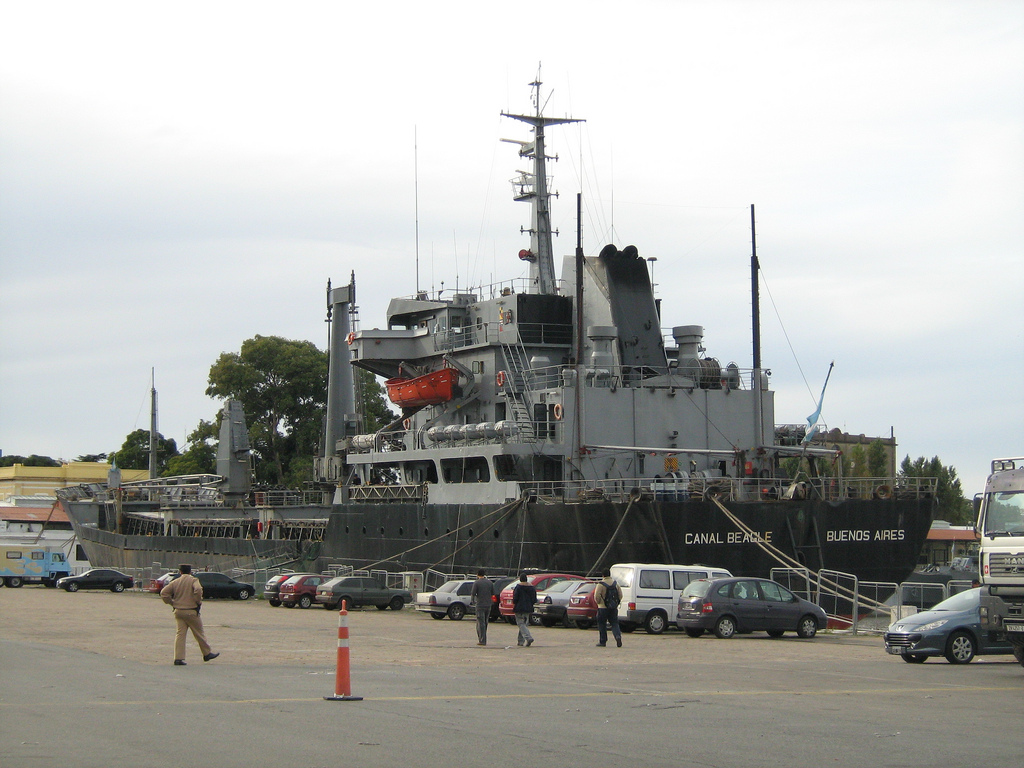
ARA Canal Beagle docked in Buenos Aires, 2010.

The ships in this class have a steel hull and the superstructure at the stern, with a single mast and a single funnel atop, behind the bridge; the cargo area is located in the middle of the ship and three “Liebherr” cranes serve the three cargo holds: one 5 ton crane serves hold 1, one 12.5 ton crane serves hold 2, and one 12.5 ton crane serves hold 3; the latter can be used simultaneously to provide a 25-ton joint lifting capacity into either hold 2 or 3. (Note: For Canal Beagle, the cranes serving holds 2 and 3 have 20 ton lifting capacity individually and 40 ton when used together.) The ships have a bulk cargo capacity of 9,700 m^{3} (340,000 cu ft) or 6,800 tons (e.g.: coal, cereals, live cattle), a refrigerated cargo capacity of 210 m^{3} (7,400 cu ft), and can carry up to 140 containers.

The ships are powered by two 6-cylinder Sulzer 6 ZL 40/48 marine diesel engines of 3,200 horsepower (2,400 kW) each, driving two variable-pitch propellers; with a maximum speed of 16.3 knots (30.2 km/h).

== Service history ==
With the ships then operating with “Naval Transport Service” ((in Spanish) Servicio de Transportes Navales) approaching obsolescence, the Argentine Navy was authorized (via decree 3/10/1975) to order the local construction of three cargo ships for the southern coastal service. The ships, with hull optimised for Patagonic coastal service, were designed and built by the Argentine Príncipe, Menghi y Penco shipyard, at Buenos Aires, Argentina, in the late 1970s and are denominated the Costa Sur class.

The first ship in the Costa Sur class, Canal Beagle, was laid down on 10 January 1977 and launched on 19 October 1977; she was commissioned on 29 April 1978 and assigned to the Argentine Navy's Naval Transport Service with the pennant number B-3. The second ship, Bahía San Blas, was laid down on 11 April 1977 and launched on 29 April 1978; she was commissioned on 27 November 1978 and assigned to the Naval Transport Service with pennant number B-4. The third (and last) ship in the class, Cabo de Hornos, was launched on 4 November 1978; (Note: Cabo de Hornos was launched as Bahía Camarones, being renamed later.) she was commissioned on 28 June 1979 and assigned to the Naval Transport Service with pennant number B-5.

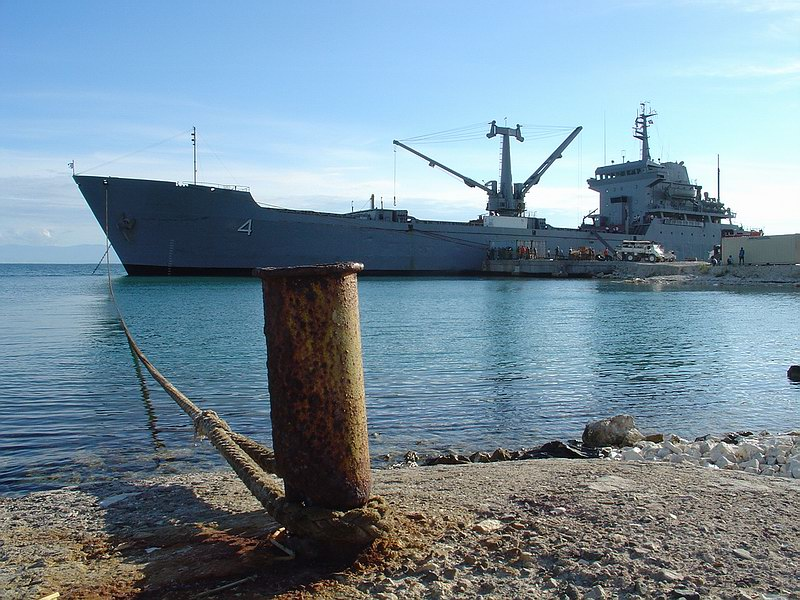
ARA Bahia San Blas (B-4) in Gonaïves, Haiti

In addition to coastal and riverine activities in Argentina, the Costa Sur-class ships also operated overseas. In 1981–82 Cabo de Hornos transported from France to Argentina the then new Super Étendard aircraft incorporated by the Argentine Naval Aviation. In 1989, Canal Beagle and Cabo de Hornos helped remove oil from the shipwreck of the polar transport ARA Bahía Paraíso, in an effort to reduce pollution in the Antarctic waters.

In 1991 Bahia San Blas was deployed to the Persian Gulf during operations Desert Shield and Desert Storm carrying humanitarian aid and providing logistic support to the Argentine warships in the area. In 1992 the three ships were involved transporting to the Gulf of Fonseca, Honduras, the four Baradero-class patrol boats used under United Nations mandate ONUCA; and then back to Argentina. Also in 1992, Cabo de Hornos transported troops, vehicles, and supplies of the Argentine Army to Yugoslavia, as part of the UNPROFOR peace mission.

In 1998, after the retirement of the tank landing ship Cabo San Antonio, Bahía San Blas was converted to an amphibious cargo ship and became the main vessel for use by the Argentine Marines. Since 2004, an Argentine contingent was deployed to Haiti under MINUSTAH mandate and she has been used for logistic support making several voyages to the Caribbean island.

In 2005, Canal Beagle was part of the naval deployment contributing to the security of the 4th Summit of the Americas ((in Spanish) IV Cumbre de las Américas) hold in the Argentine city of Mar del Plata.

Starting in late 2007, Canal Beagle took part in the Argentine Antarctic Program replacing the icebreaker ARA Almirante Irízar in the resupply of the Argentine bases in Argentine Antarctica.

As of late 2016, the three ships in the class remain in service with the Argentine Navy.

== Ships in class ==
Three ships were built as part of this class.

Ship Name	Pennant Number	Other names	Builder	Laid down	Launched	Service entry	Decommissioning
ARA Canal Beagle	B-3	none	Príncipe, Menghi y Penco	1977]	1977	1978	in service
ARA Bahía San Blas	B-4	none	Príncipe, Menghi y Penco	1977	1978	1978	?
ARA Cabo de Hornos	B-5	Bahía Camarones	Príncipe, Menghi y Penco		1978	1979	2013?

== See also ==
- List of ships of the Argentine Navy
