= United Nations Security Council Resolution 730 =

UN Security Council Resolution 730
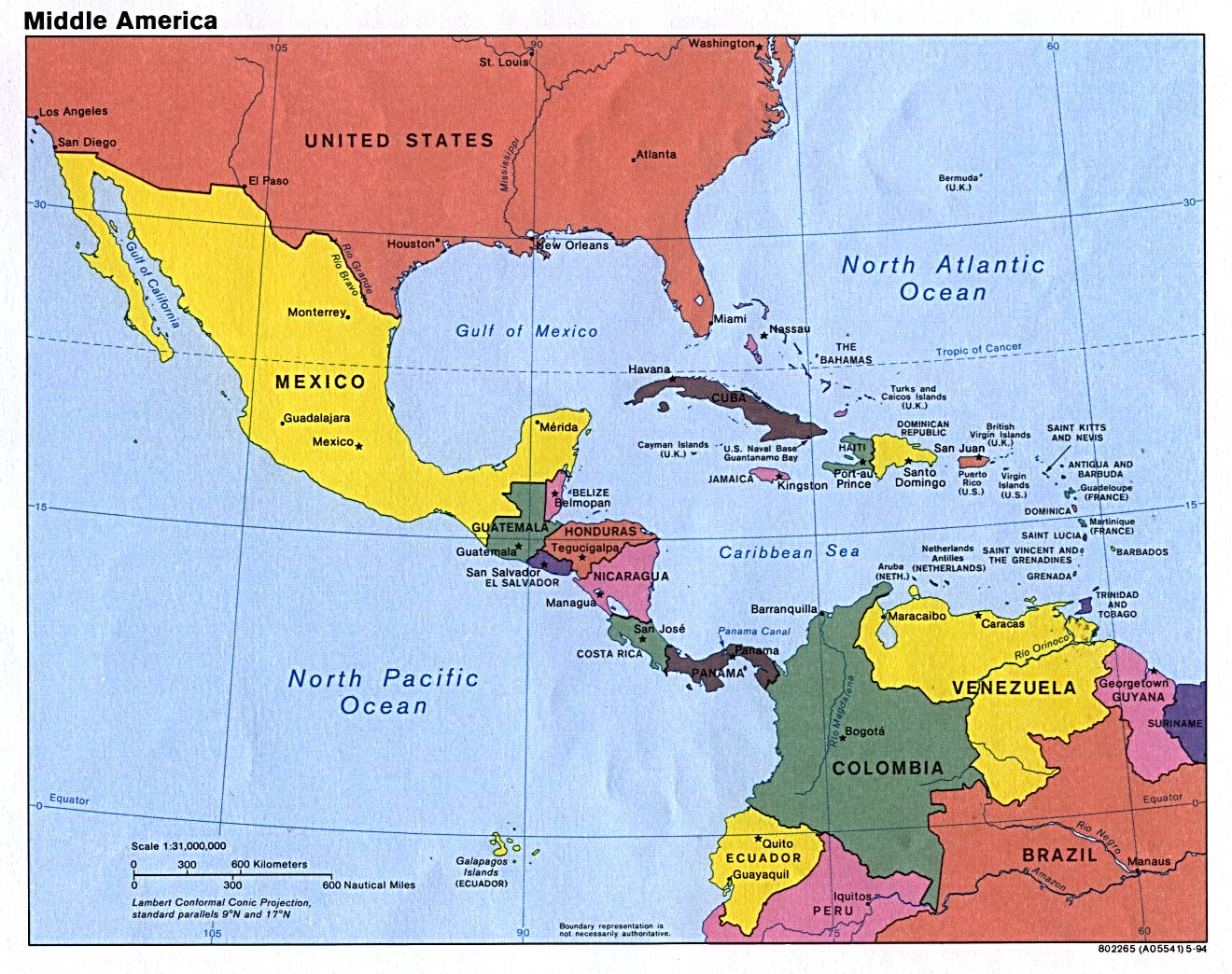
- Central America
- Date: 16 January 1992
- Meeting no.: 3,031
- Code: S/RES/730 (Document)
- Subject: Central America
- Voting summary: 15 voted for; None voted against; None abstained
- Result: Adopted

Security Council composition
- Permanent members: China; France; Russia; United Kingdom; United States
- Non-permanent members: Austria; Belgium; Cape Verde; Ecuador; Hungary; India; Japan; Morocco; Venezuela; Zimbabwe

United Nations Security Council resolution 730, adopted unanimously on 16 January 1992, after recalling resolutions 719 (1991) and 729 (1992) the Council approved a report by the Secretary-General from 14 January, and decided to terminate the mandate of the United Nations Observer Group in Central America (ONUCA) with effect from 17 January 1992.

ONUCA's mandate was primarily extended at the request of Central and South American governments. Towards the end of the mandate, there were substantial reductions and a refocusing of its tasks to liaising with the security forces of the five Central American states. By ending the mandate of ONUCA, it allowed the Secretary-General Boutros Boutros-Ghali to transfer personnel to the nearby United Nations Observer Mission in El Salvador.

== See also ==
- History of Central America
- History of Nicaragua
- List of United Nations Security Council Resolutions 701 to 800 (1991–1993)
