= United Nations Security Council Resolution 691 =

UN Security Council Resolution 691
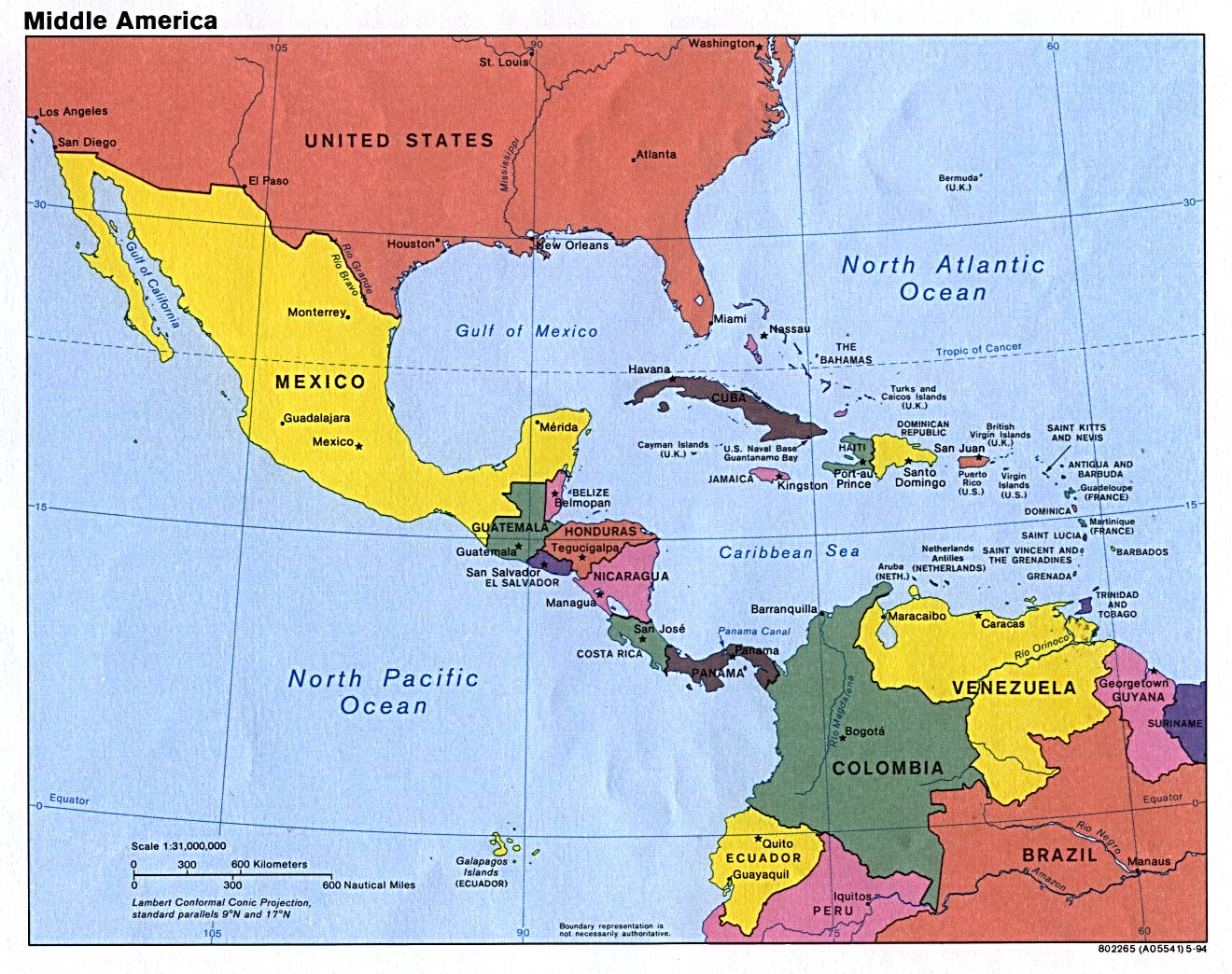
- Central America
- Date: 6 May 1991
- Meeting no.: 2,986
- Code: S/RES/691 (Document)
- Subject: Central America
- Voting summary: 15 voted for; None voted against; None abstained
- Result: Adopted

Security Council composition
- Permanent members: China; France; Soviet Union; United Kingdom; United States
- Non-permanent members: Austria; Belgium; Côte d'Ivoire; Cuba; Ecuador; India; Romania; Yemen; Zaire; Zimbabwe

United Nations Security Council resolution 691, adopted unanimously on 6 May 1991, after recalling resolutions 637 (1989), 644 (1989) and 675 (1990), the Council endorsed a report by the Secretary-General and decided to extend the mandate of the United Nations Observer Group in Central America for a further six months until 7 November 1991.

The resolution noted the need to remain vigilant of the financial costs of the Observer Group, given the increased demand on United Nations peacekeeping forces. It also requested the Secretary-General to report back before the end of the current mandate on all aspects of the Observer Group.

== See also ==
- History of Central America
- History of Nicaragua
- List of United Nations Security Council Resolutions 601 to 700 (1987–1991)
