= United Nations Security Council Resolution 991 =

UN Security Council Resolution 991
- ONUSAL medal bar
- Date: 28 April 1995
- Meeting no.: 3,528
- Code: S/RES/991 (Document)
- Subject: El Salvador
- Voting summary: 15 voted for; None voted against; None abstained
- Result: Adopted

Security Council composition
- Permanent members: China; France; Russia; United Kingdom; United States
- Non-permanent members: Argentina; Botswana; Czech Republic; Germany; Honduras; Indonesia; Italy; Nigeria; Oman; Rwanda

United Nations Security Council resolution 991, adopted unanimously on 28 April 1995, after recalling all resolutions and statements on the situation in El Salvador, the Council terminated the United Nations Observer Mission in El Salvador (ONUSAL).

The Council recognised that El Salvador had arisen from conflicts to a democratic and peaceful nation and paid tribute to ONUSAL for its efforts. It welcomed the continued commitment of the Salvadoran government and people to national reconciliation and stabilisation of political life in the country.

Both the Government of El Salvador and Farabundo Martí National Liberation Front were urged to accelerate the implementation of relevant peace agreements to ensure the irreversibility of the peace process, while the international community would continue to provide assistance.

The resolution concluded by affirming that the mandate of ONUSAL would terminate on 30 April 1995, in accordance with Resolution 961 (1994).

== See also ==
- List of United Nations Security Council Resolutions 901 to 1000 (1994–1995)
- Salvadoran Civil War
- United Nations Observer Group in Central America
