= ARA Canal Beagle =

Cargo ship in service with the Argentine Navy

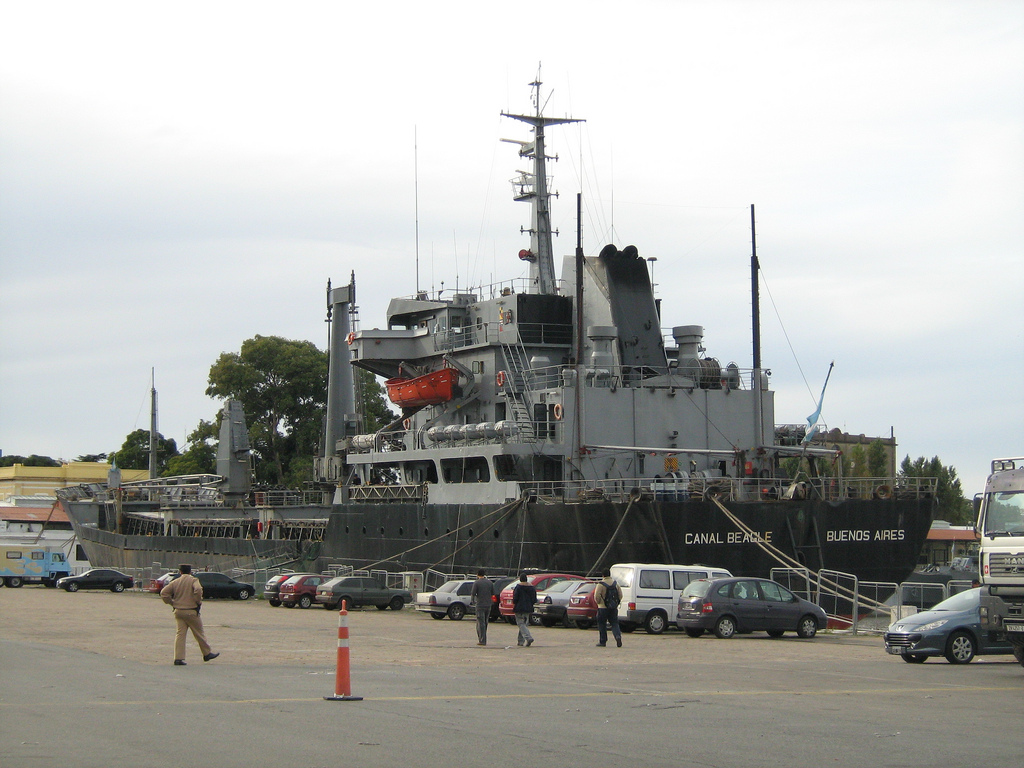
- Canal Beagle docked in Buenos Aires, 2010

History

Argentina
- Name: Canal Beagle
- Namesake: Beagle Channel
- Ordered: 1975
- Builder: Príncipe, Menghi y Penco shipyard, Argentina
- Yard number: 108
- Laid down: 1977
- Launched: 1977
- Commissioned: 1978
- Identification: Call sign: LOCB; IMO number: 7529017; MMSI number: 701802000
- Status: In service

General characteristics
- Class & type: Costa Sur-class cargo ship
- Displacement: 10,894 tons full load
- Length: 119.9 m (393 ft 4 in)
- Beam: 17.5 m (57 ft 5 in)
- Draught: 7.49 m (24 ft 7 in)
- Propulsion: 2 Sulzer 6 ZL 40/48 diesel engines, 6,400 hp (4,800 kW), 2 shaft
- Speed: 16.3 knots (30.2 km/h) max; 12 knots (22 km/h) cruise
- Capacity: bulk cargo: 9,700 m^{3} (340,000 cu ft) or 6,800 tons; refrigerated cargo: 210 m^{3} (7,400 cu ft)
- Complement: 40
- Notes: characteristics from Argentine Navy official website.

ARA Canal Beagle (B-3) is a cargo ship in service with the Argentine Navy since 1978, capable of transporting bulk cargo, live cattle, and containers. She is the second ship in the Argentine Navy to bear the name of the Beagle Channel in the south of Tierra del Fuego.

== Design ==
Canal Beagle (B-3) is one of three Costa Sur-class (Note: The other ships in the class are the ARA Bahia San Blas and ARA Cabo de Hornos.) cargo ships ordered by the Argentine Navy in 1975, designed and built by the Argentine Príncipe, Menghi y Penco shipyard, at Buenos Aires, Argentina. The design is optimised for Patagonic coastal service.

Canal Beagle has a steel hull and the superstructure at the stern, with a single mast and a single funnel atop, behind the bridge; the cargo area is located in the middle of the ship and three “Liebherr” cranes serve the three holds, one each. (Note: One 5 ton crane serves hold 1, and two 20 ton cranes serve holds 2 and 3; these can be used simultaneously to provide a 40 ton lifting capacity into either hold 2 or 3.) She has a bulk cargo capacity of 9,700 m^{3} (340,000 cu ft) or 6,800 tons (e.g.: coal, cereals, live cattle), a refrigerated cargo capacity of 210 m^{3} (7,400 cu ft), and can carry up to 140 containers.

Canal Beagle is powered by two 6-cylinder Sulzer 6 ZL 40/48 marine diesel engines of 3,200 hp (2,400 kW) each, driving two variable-pitch propellers; with a maximum speed of 16.3 knots (30.2 km/h).

== History ==
With the ships then operating with “Naval Transport Service” ((in Spanish) Servicio de Transportes Navales) approaching obsolescence, the Argentine Navy was authorized (via decree 3/10/1975) to order the local construction of three cargo ships for the southern coastal service. The ships, with hull optimised for Patagonic coastal service, were designed and built by the Argentine Príncipe, Menghi y Penco shipyard, at Buenos Aires, Argentina, in the late 1970s and are denominated the Costa Sur-class.

Canal Beagle, the first ship in her class, was laid down on 10 January 1977 and launched on 19 October 1977. She was commissioned on 29 April 1978 and assigned to the Argentine Navy's Naval Transport Service with pennant number B-3.

In addition to coastal and riverine activities in Argentina, Canal Beagle also operated overseas. In 1989, Canal Beagle helped remove oil from the shipwreck of the polar transport ARA Bahía Paraíso, in an effort to reduce pollution in the Antarctic waters. In 1992 she transported to the Gulf of Fonseca, Honduras, the four Baradero-class patrol boats used under United Nations mandate ONUCA.

In 2005, Canal Beagle was part of the naval deployment contributing to the security of the 4th Summit of the Americas ((in Spanish) IV Cumbre de las Américas) hold in the Argentine city of Mar del Plata.

Starting in late 2007, she took part in the Argentine Antarctic Program replacing the icebreaker in the resupply of the Argentine bases in Argentine Antarctica.

The ship remains active, participating in an exercise off the coast of Mar del Plata with other Argentine naval units in 2022 and in a 2025 exercise with the Argentine Marines.
