= ARA Cabo de Hornos =

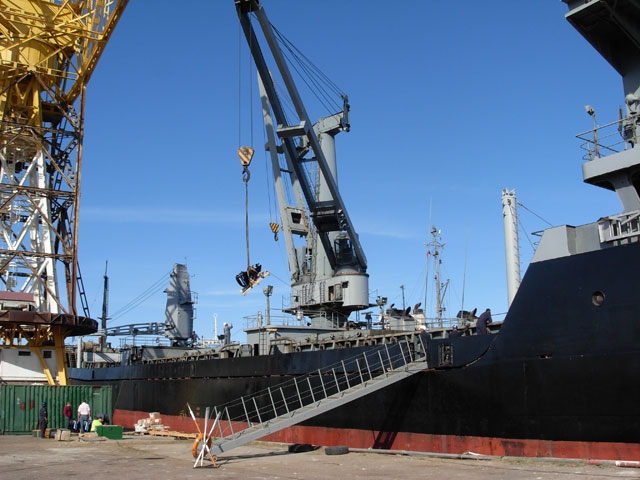
- Cabo de Hornos docked

History

Argentina
- Name: Cabo de Hornos
- Namesake: Cape Horn
- Ordered: 1975
- Builder: Príncipe, Menghi y Penco shipyard, Argentina
- Launched: 1978
- Commissioned: 1979
- Identification: IMO number: 7529031
- Status: Decommissioned

General characteristics
- Class & type: Costa Sur-class cargo ship
- Displacement: 10,894 tons full load
- Length: 119.9 m (393 ft)
- Beam: 17.5 m (57 ft)
- Draught: 7.49 m (24.6 ft)
- Propulsion: 2 Sulzer 6 ZL 40/48 diesel engines, 6,400 hp (4,800 kW), 2 shafts
- Speed: 16.3 knots (30.2 km/h) max; 12 knots (22 km/h) cruise
- Capacity: bulk cargo: 9,857 m^{3} (348,100 cu ft) or 6,800 tons
- Complement: 40
- Notes: characteristics from Argentine Navy official website.

ARA Cabo de Hornos (B-5) was a cargo ship in service with the Argentine Navy since 1979, capable of transporting bulk cargo, live cattle, and containers. She was the second ship in the Argentine Navy to bear the name of the Cape Horn (Chile) located to the south of Tierra del Fuego.

== Design ==
Cabo de Hornos (B-5) was one of three Costa Sur-class (Note: The other ships in the class are the ARA Canal Beagle and ARA Bahia San Blas.) cargo ships ordered by the Argentine Navy in 1975, designed and built by the Argentine Príncipe, Menghi y Penco shipyard, at Buenos Aires, Argentina. The design is optimised for Patagonic coastal service.

Cabo de Hornos has a steel hull and the superstructure at the stern, with a single mast and a single funnel atop, behind the bridge; the cargo area is located in the middle of the ship and three “Liebherr” cranes serve the three holds, one each. (Note: One 5 ton crane serves hold 1, and two 20 ton cranes serve holds 2 and 3; these can be used simultaneously to provide a 40 ton lifting capacity into either hold 2 or 3.) She has a bulk cargo capacity of 9,856 m^{3} (348,100 cu ft) or 6,300 tons (e.g.: coal, cereals, live cattle), and can carry up to 140 containers.

Cabo de Hornos is powered by two 6-cylinder Sulzer 6 ZL 40/48 marine diesel engines of 3,200 hp (2,400 kW) each, driving two variable-pitch propellers; with a maximum speed of 16.3 knots (30.2 km/h; 18.8 mph).

== History ==
With the ships then operating with “Naval Transport Service” ((in Spanish) Servicio de Transportes Navales) approaching obsolescence, the Argentine Navy was authorized (via decree 3/10/1975) to order the local construction of three cargo ships for the southern coastal service. The ships, with hull optimised for Patagonic coastal service, were designed and built by the Argentine Príncipe, Menghi y Penco shipyard, at Buenos Aires, Argentina, in the late 1970s and are denominated the Costa Sur class.

Cabo de Hornos, the third ship in her class, was launched on 4 November 1978 as Bahía Camarones, being renamed later. She was commissioned on 28 June 1979 and assigned to the Argentine Navy's Naval Transport Service with the pennant number B-5.

In addition to coastal and riverine activities in Argentina, Cabo de Hornos also operated overseas. In 1981–82 she transported from France to Argentina the then new Super Étendard aircraft incorporated by the Argentine Naval Aviation. In 1989, Cabo de Hornos helped remove oil from the shipwreck of the polar transport ARA Bahía Paraíso, in an effort to reduce pollution in the Antarctic waters. In 1992 she transported to the Gulf of Fonseca, Honduras, the four Baradero-class patrol boats used under United Nations mandate ONUCA. Also in 1992, she transported troops, vehicles, and supplies of the Argentine Army to Yugoslavia, as part of the UNPROFOR peace mission.

In mid-2012 her hull underwent maintenance.

As of late 2016, Cabo de Hornos remained in service with the Argentine Navy.

In 2022, it was announced that, if there were to be any buyers, the decommissioned Cabo de Hornos would be auctioned off.
