= United Nations Security Council Resolution 675 =

UN Security Council Resolution 675
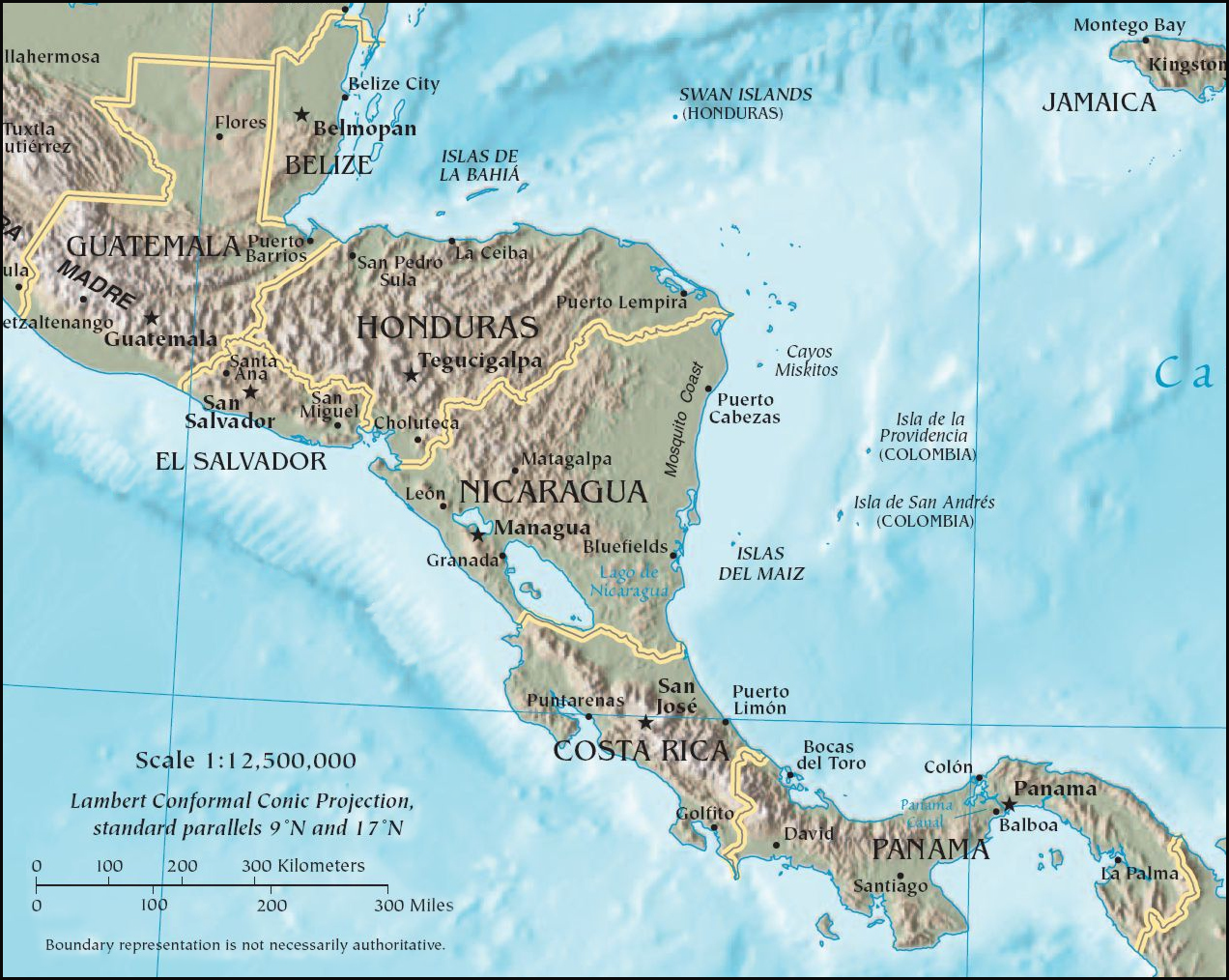
- Central America
- Date: 5 November 1990
- Meeting no.: 2,952
- Code: S/RES/675 (Document)
- Subject: Central America
- Voting summary: 15 voted for; None voted against; None abstained
- Result: Adopted

Security Council composition
- Permanent members: China; France; Soviet Union; United Kingdom; United States
- Non-permanent members: Canada; Colombia; Côte d'Ivoire; Cuba; Ethiopia; Finland; Malaysia; Romania; Yemen; Zaire

United Nations Security Council resolution 675, adopted unanimously on 5 November 1990, after recalling resolutions 637 (1989) and 644 (1989), the Council endorsed a report by the Secretary-General and decided to extend the mandate of the United Nations Observer Group in Central America for a further six months until 7 May 1991.

The resolution noted the need to remain vigilant of the financial costs of the Observer Group, given the increased demand on United Nations peacekeeping forces. It also requested the Secretary-General to report back before the end of the current mandate on all aspects of the Observer Group.

== See also ==
- History of Central America
- History of Nicaragua
- List of United Nations Security Council Resolutions 601 to 700 (1987–1991)
