= Iqbal Riza =

Pakistani diplomat (born 1934)

Iqbal Riza (born 20 May 1934 in Lonavala, India) is a retired Pakistani diplomat. He is currently a special adviser to the Secretary-General of the United Nations, and has worked for the Spanish Foundation Concordia 21. He served as the Chef de Cabinet (Chief of Staff) to United Nations Secretary-General Kofi Annan from his appointment at the beginning of Annan's term in January 1997 until his retirement January 15, 2005.

Previously, he acted as Assistant Secretary-General in the Department of Peacekeeping Operations starting March 1993. During this time, from 1996 to 1997, he also concurrently served as Special Representative of the Secretary-General and Chief of the United Nations Mission in Bosnia and Herzegovina (UNMIBH). Earlier, from 1991 to 1993, he was Special Representative of the Secretary-General and Chief of the United Nations Observer Mission in El Salvador (ONUSAL).

In addition, he served in various capacities within the United Nations, including Chief of Mission of the United Nations Transition Team in El Salvador (March–August 1990), Chief of the United Nations Observer Mission for verification of the electoral process in Nicaragua (ONUVEN) (August 1989 - February 1990), Director of the Division for Political and General Assembly Affairs (1988–1989), Director of the Office for Special Political Affairs (1983–1988), Principal Officer in the United Nations Department of Public Information (1980–1982), and Secretary of the Committee on the Exercise of the Inalienable Rights of the Palestinian People (1978–1980).

Prior to joining the United Nations, Riza received a Master of Arts degree from University of the Punjab and Riza also received a graduate degree from the Fletcher School of Law and Diplomacy and served with Pakistan's Foreign Service from 1958 to 1977.
