= Operation Skua Polar I =

- Part of Antarctic Exploration
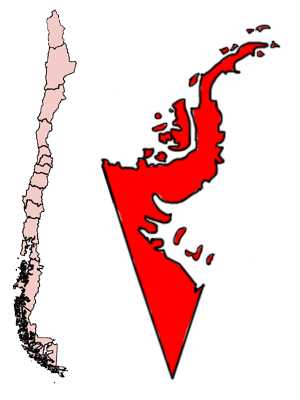
- Chilean Antarctica in Chile
| Date | 1980 - 1981 |
| Location | Chilean Antarctica, Antarctica |
| Result | Chilean victory |

Belligerents
- Chile

Commanders and leaders
- Colonel Valentín Segura

Operation Skua Polar I was an exploratory operation by Chile in the Chilean Antarctic Territory. Led by Colonel Valentín Segura, the expedition explored much of Antarctica for Chile.
