= ONUSAL =

UN Peace mission for El Salvador

United Nations Observer Mission in El Salvador
- ONUSAL Medal Bar
- Abbreviation: ONUSAL
- Formation: May 20, 1991; 34 years ago
- Dissolved: April 28, 1995; 30 years ago
- Headquarters: San Salvador
- Leader: Iqbal Riza, 1991-1993; Augusto Ramírez Ocampo, 1993-1994

ONUSAL, acronym for the United Nations Observer Mission In El Salvador, (Spanish: Misión de Observadores de Naciones Unidas en El Salvador), was a peacekeeping mission from July 1991 to April 1995. Created towards the end of the Salvadoran Civil War, the United Nations oversaw the transition to peace between Farabundo Martí National Liberation Front (FMLN) and the government of El Salvador. The UN was invited by both parties involved for monitoring the human rights conditions within the country.

== Establishment ==
The situation in El Salvador in 1990–1991 was characterized by a continuing civil war and hopes for peace that culminated in intense UN-sponsored talks. These achieved a cease-fire agreement in a December 1991 New Year's Eve "Act of New York" which expanded the original ONUSAL established by Security Council Resolution 693, whose limited mission was restricted to monitoring human rights, and converted it into a new major UN verification and observation mission. Contra demobilization in Nicaragua provided a useful precedent for FMLN demobilization in El Salvador. With the expanded ONUSAL came the end of the now much-diminished ONUCA, whose personnel and assets were quickly moved to El Salvador in January 1992.

== Difference from ONUCA ==
ONUSAL differed from ONUCA, a similar peacekeeping mission in Central America, in one key respect: the police function. A key element in the Salvadoran peace process was that demobilization of the FMLN would be accompanied by demobilization of certain military and police units which had been associated with some of the more brutal human rights violations of the ten-year civil war. To replace the old security and police forces, there would be a new National Police which would include personnel from both the old police and the FMLN. These new National Civilian Police differed from tradition in that they were categorized as separate from the military. These personnel had to be trained quickly, and this was one of the functions of the Civilian Police Division of ONUSAL, also known as CIVPOL.

CIVPOL included officers from Chile, Mexico and Guyana, as well as several European countries. It created a new police training academy and selected candidates for it. The National Police, National Guard, and Treasury police were all to be replaced by the single new National Police unit. While the National Guard and Treasury Police were quickly abolished, the old National Police had to be phased out slowly to ensure time for the new National Police to be properly trained and established throughout the country. In the meantime, the original National Police force was under UN monitoring.

== Activity ==
ONUSAL military observers in the "Military Division" included officers from Spain, Brazil, Canada, Colombia, Ecuador, Ireland, Sweden, India and Venezuela; Argentina provided medical officers and Argentine Navy's patrol boats. The relative activity of the various divisions of ONUSAL can be seen from their authorized strengths: the Human Rights Division included approximately 50 observers, legal advisors and educators; the Military Division was authorized 249, with an additional 88 observers deployed for the critical "separation of forces" period in early 1992; the Police Division, by far the largest, was provided with 631 personnel.

Although there were problems and delays in the original schedule worked out in the December 1991 New York and January 1992 Mexico City agreements, the process was eventually successful, thanks in no small part to the ONUSAL presence. From February until 15 December 1992 the FMLN was concentrated into 15 camps under ONUSAL supervision, where they slowly demobilized and turned in their weapons for disposition by ONUSAL. Simultaneously, key units of the Salvadoran armed forces also demobilized and officers identified with human rights violations were purged from the military. At the same time the old Salvadoran National Guard and the Treasury Police were dissolved and the new "Policía Nacional Civil" (PNC) was created under a crash training program supervised by the Police Division of ONUSAL. The process was not without its difficulties, and elements in the regular Salvadoran police and military, supported by right-wing political elements, resisted the process.

ONUSAL was terminated in Security Council Resolution 991 in April 1995.
