= United Nations Security Council Resolution 644 =

UN Security Council Resolution 644
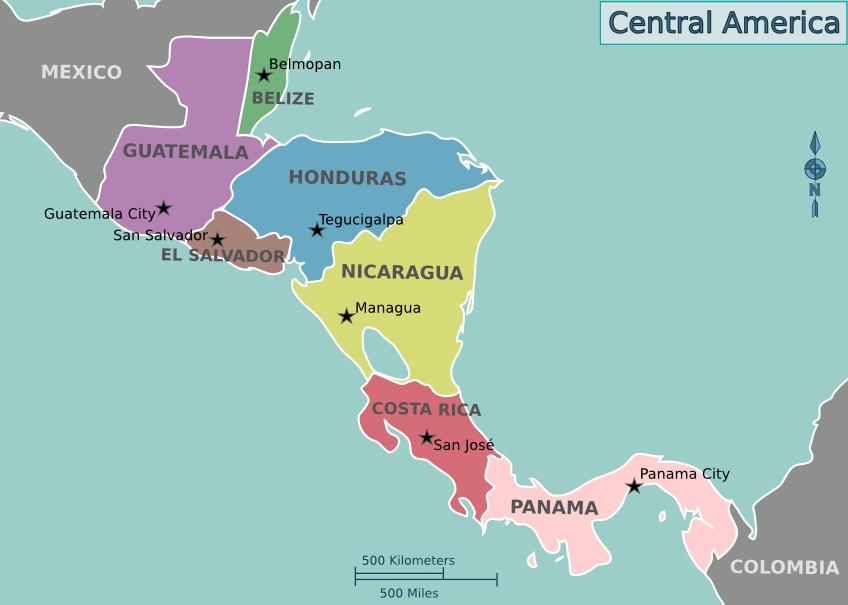
- Central America
- Date: 7 November 1989
- Meeting no.: 2,890
- Code: S/RES/644 (Document)
- Subject: Central America
- Voting summary: 15 voted for; None voted against; None abstained
- Result: Adopted

Security Council composition
- Permanent members: China; France; Soviet Union; United Kingdom; United States
- Non-permanent members: Algeria; Brazil; Canada; Colombia; Ethiopia; Finland; Malaysia; Nepal; Senegal; Yugoslavia

United Nations Security Council resolution 644, adopted unanimously on 7 November 1989, after recalling Resolution 637 (1989), the Council endorsed the report by the Secretary-General and decided to establish the United Nations Observer Group in Central America (ONUCA) in accordance with the report.

The Council noted the need to monitor monetary expenditure carefully, and established the Observer Group in Central America for an initial period of six months, requesting the Secretary-General to keep the Council updated on developments.

ONUCA was able to undertake on-site verification of the cessation of aid to irregular forces and insurrectionist movements and the non-use of territory of one state for attacks on another. The costs for the initial dispatch were US$41 million, and the Council appointed, inline with the Secretary-General's recommendations, General Agustin Quesada Gómez of Spain as the Chief Observer of the ONUCA. The Observer Group itself would be unarmed, and would consist of 260 military observers, 115 air-crew and support personnel, 50 naval personnel, 14 medical personnel, 104 international staff to perform administrative and political functions and 84 civilians.

== See also ==
- Contras
- History of Central America
- List of United Nations Security Council Resolutions 601 to 700 (1987–1991)
