= ARA Bahía Paraíso =

Argentine Navy auxiliary ship that sank in 1989

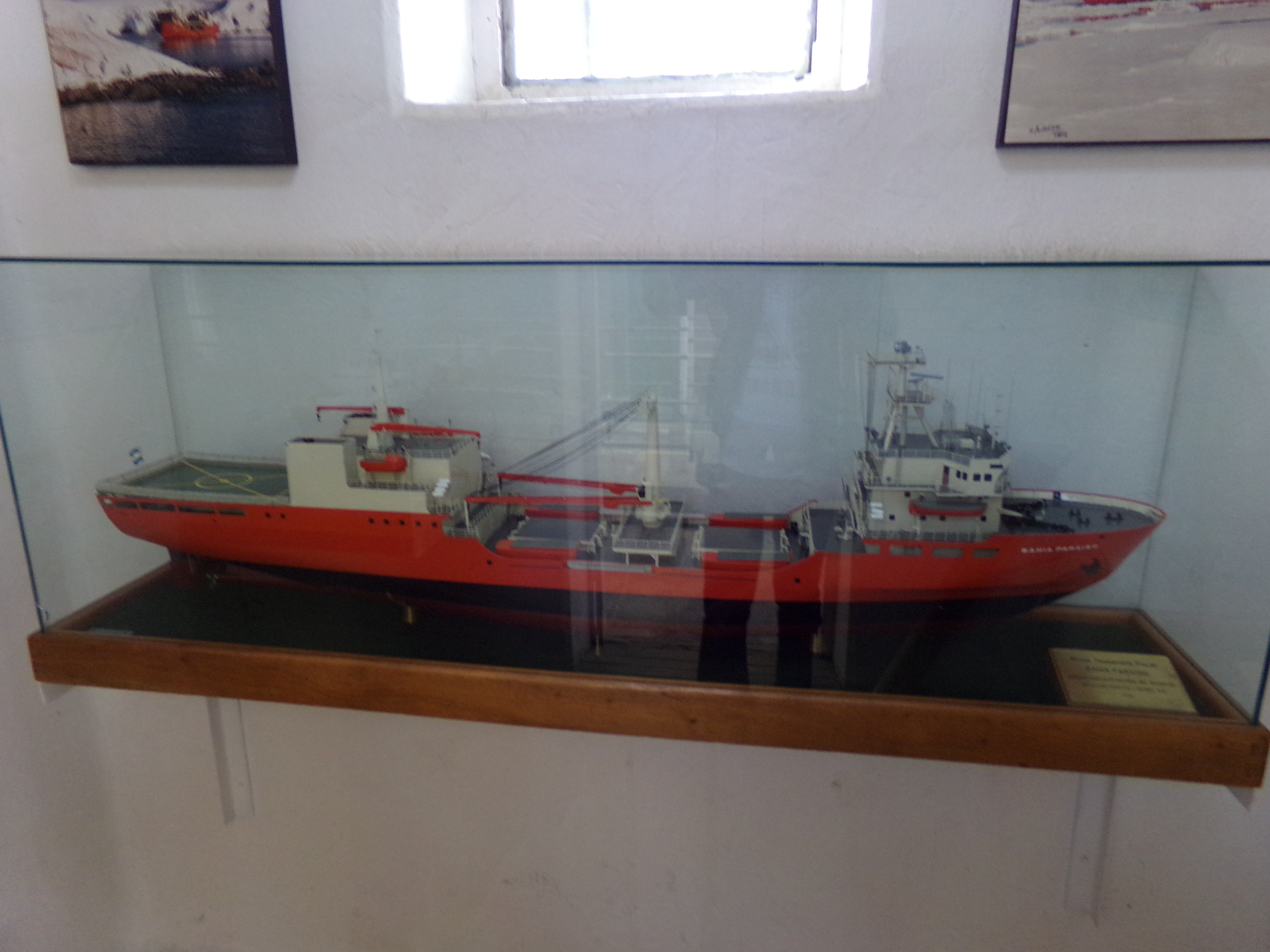
- Model of the Bahía Paraíso.

History

Argentina
- Name: Bahia Paraiso
- Builder: Astilleros Príncipe y Menghi SA
- Yard number: 147
- Laid down: 1979
- Launched: 1980
- Commissioned: 1981
- Decommissioned: 1989
- Identification: IMO number: 8012970; Pennant number: Q6 (as supply ship) A52 (during Falklands War until April 1981 when repainted as hospital ship with no numbering) B1 (late in career and as research vessel)
- Fate: sank in waters off Palmer Station, Antarctica

General characteristics
- Length: 133 m (436 ft 4 in)
- Beam: 20 m (65 ft 7 in)
- Draught: 10 m (32 ft 10 in)
- Propulsion: 2 × Sulzer diesel engines 12,000 hp (8,900 kW), dual shaft, 2 screws
- Speed: 18 knots (33 km/h; 21 mph)
- Complement: 124 crew + 252 troops or 124 crew + 84 passengers
- Aviation facilities: hangar and flight deck for two helicopters

ARA Bahía Paraíso was an Argentine Navy auxiliary ship that sank in 1989, 2 miles (3.2 km) from Palmer Station at Arthur Harbor, Antarctica, resulting in a 170,000 US gal (640,000 L; 140,000 imp gal) oil spill.

== Construction and design ==
Bahía Paraíso was ordered by the Argentine Navy on 27 February 1979 (Note: Jane's Fighting Ships states that Bahía Paraíso was laid down on that date.) as a supply ship for use in Antarctic waters. The ship was launched from the Argentine shipyard Astilleros Príncipe y Menghi SA on 3 July 1980, entering service on 3 December 1981, with the pennant number Q 6.

Bahía Paraíso was 130.7 m (429 ft) long overall and 120.0 m (393.7 ft) between perpendiculars, with a beam of 19.5 m (64 ft) and a draught of 7.0 m (23.0 ft). The ship had an icebreaking hull. Displacement was 9,200 t (9,100 long tons) full load. Two diesel engines rated at a total of 15,000 shp (11,000 kW) drove two controllable pitch propellers, giving a speed of 18 kn (21 mph; 33 km/h).

The ship's holds had a capacity of 1,200 m^{3} (42,000 ft^{3}) dry cargo, with an additional 250 m^{3} (8,800 ft^{3}) refrigerated storage, together with 1200 tons of cargo fuel. A flight deck and hangar for two helicopters was fitted. The ship had a crew of 124, and could carry 84 civilian passengers, who could be replaced by 252 troops.

== Operational history ==
The ship operated as a naval auxiliary vessel from 1981 to 1986 and served in the Falklands War as a troop transport as well as a hospital ship. It was involved in transporting troops to Leith Harbour prior to the Invasion of South Georgia.

After the war it reverted to an Antarctic supply ship for the Navy with occasional tourists on board. It was on a resupply trip with tourists to Antarctica on January 28, 1989 when it struck rock and sank off Anvers Island. Passengers and crew were rescued by the Spanish Navy oceanographic research vessel Las Palmas and the Chilean Navy tug Cruz de Forward.

The resultant oil spill of about 200,000 gallons of diesel and jet fuel constitutes the largest oil spill in Antarctica. Chilean Coast Guard Tender Yelcho arrived February 6 to begin clean up operations.

== See also ==
- List of auxiliary ships of the Argentine Navy
