= ONUCA =

United Nations peacekeeping mission in Central America

United Nations Observer Group in Central America
- ONUCA Medal Bar
- Abbreviation: ONUCA
- Formation: November 7, 1989; 35 years ago
- Dissolved: January 17, 1992; 33 years ago

ONUCA was a United Nations peacekeeping mission deployed in Central America in 1990 and 1991.

== ONUCA ==
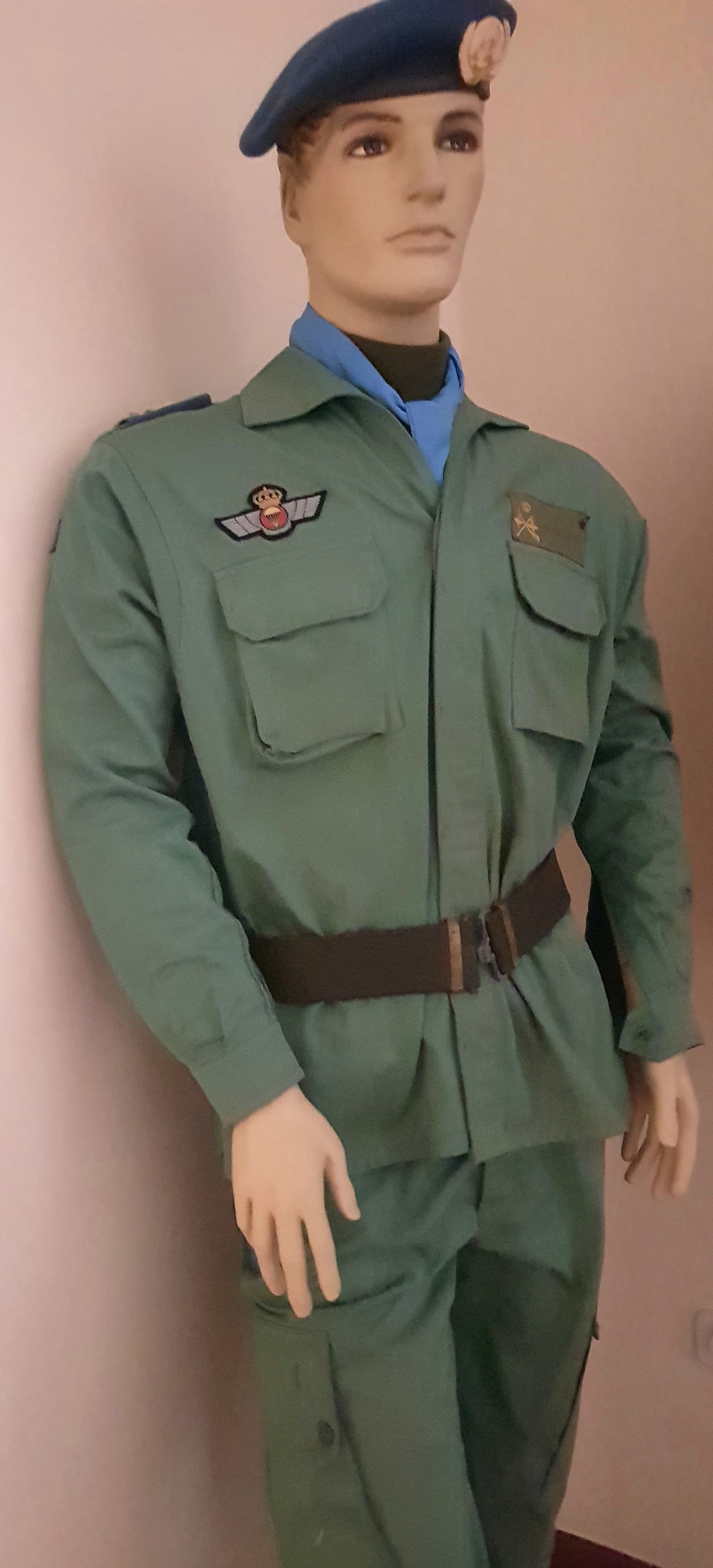
Uniform of a Spanish observer.

The United Nations Security Council formally created ONUCA ("United Nations Observer Group in Central America") when it approved Resolution 644 on 7 November 1989. The 625-person group, located in 33 regional bases, was responsible for halting cross-border infiltration and cutting support for rebels in the Central American region, and consisted of 260 unarmed military observers along with supporting technicians. Hemisphere countries involved in ONUCA included Spain, Sweden, Ireland, India, Venezuela, Canada, Argentina, Brazil, Ecuador and Colombia. ONUCA's initial mandate, composition and operational concept reflected the UN reluctance to get involved in internal conflicts. It was to be a verification and peace-observing mission, not a full-scale peacekeeping interposition mission, and certainly not peace-enforcement, although as events unfolded there were brief periods when Contra reluctance to disband threatened to convert ONUCA's role to one of enforcement. The scope of the operation was briefly moved up the conflict resolution spectrum for the period of Contra demobilization, but the UN consistently defined ONUCA's mission as a verification one. This limited definition of ONUCA's role was also a reflection of the Latin American resistance to peacekeeping, and their preference for smaller observation missions with the lowest possible military profile. The Canadians, who were used to larger peacekeeping missions, frequently called ONUCA a “minimalist” operation, noting that it would have difficulty verifying the Esquipulas Agreement in the large geographic area assigned to it.

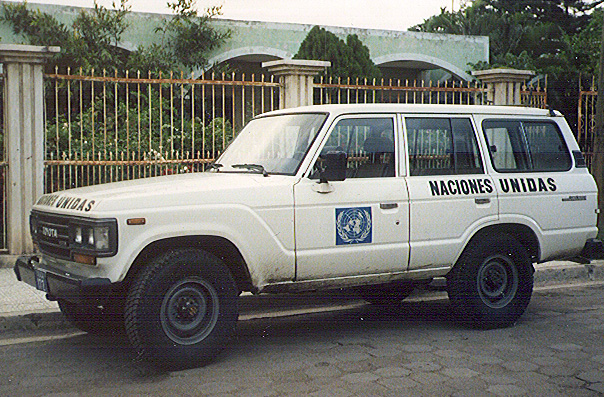
UN ONUCA vehicle, Estelí, Nicaragua

In early 1990 the Contras were showing considerable reluctance to disband. This was due in part to the lack of control on the part of the fragmented Contra leadership, as well as the very real fears among the Contras that if they disbanded and gave up their weapons they would be at the mercy of the Sandinista military. Although diplomats on all sides pressured the Contras, the hard line being taken on the Contras was undermined by the reality that 260 unarmed UN observers were not going to force the Contras to do anything. And so, setting aside their historical aversion to peace-enforcement, the Security Council decided to expand ONUCA's mandate and temporarily give it some combat power: a battalion of paratroopers with their basic weapons. On 15 March 1990 the UN Secretary-General asked the Security Council, on an urgent basis, that ONUCA be expanded from its 260 observers to add 116 more for observation plus an armed infantry battalion of at least four rifle companies (about 800 troops) for supervision of Contra demobilization. Venezuela, which already was providing observers to ONUCA, had agreed to provide this battalion. Although the Secretary-General's Report did not say that the demobilization would be forced, there was a clear implication that adding armed paratroopers to the unarmed UN military observers would be a powerful message to the reluctant Contras.

The demobilization process did not officially end until 5 July when the last elements of the Venezuelan Battalion returned home. Exact figures on the number demobilized were somewhat questionable, but there were approximately 23,000 Contras processed, and close to 17,000 weapons recovered and destroyed. With the demobilization of the Contras completed in early July, the ONUCA mandate reverted to the original rather limited one of concentrating on the borders and watching for violations of the Esquipulas II prohibition on cross-border support of irregular forces.

In November 1990 the Security Council accepted the Secretary-General's recommendation that because of its reduced mission, the size of ONUCA could be cut back somewhat. The Council also extended the mandate for six months (twice, to November 1991), and agreed that its main focus would be to maintain a UN presence in the region as a confidence-building measure, and in order to deter cross-border support for insurgencies. In effect, ONUCA was now becoming a token and "flag-showing" presence waiting for a possible expanded mandate if the situation in El Salvador should lead to an agreement requiring UN verification. It was terminated in Resolution 730 with effect on January 17, 1992, with some of the forces joining ONUSAL.
