= Alain Pellegrini =

French general (born 1946)

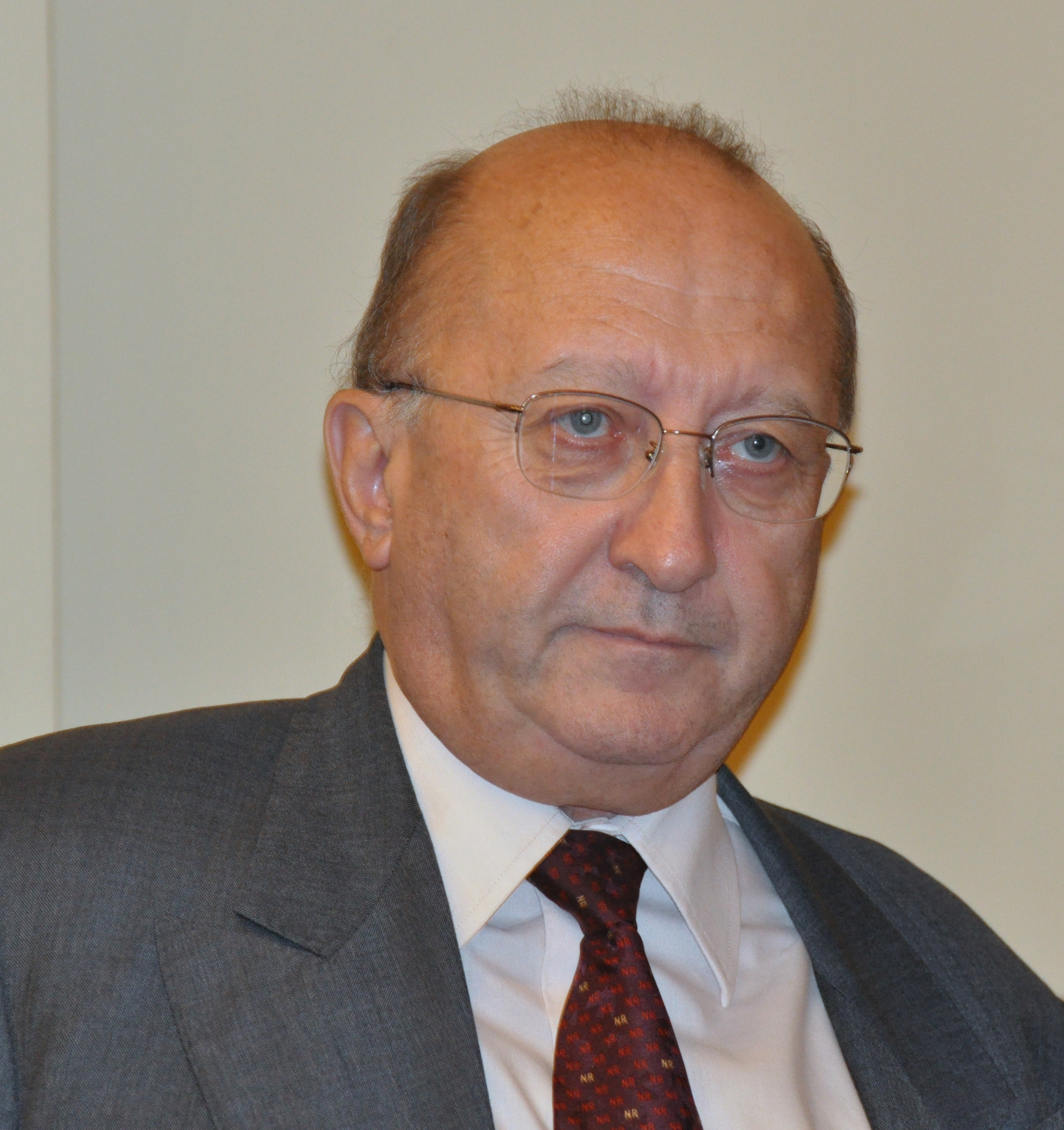
- Alain Pellegrini in 2011.
- Born: 12 August 1946 (age 80); La Flèche, France
- Military career
- Allegiance: France
- Branch: French Army
- Rank: General de division

Alain Pellegrini (born 12 August 1946) is a French general.

A former student of the École Spéciale Militaire de Saint-Cyr, Pellegrini graduated from general staff schools before being appointed in Africa and the Middle East, and commanding a regiment of the troupes de marine in Fréjus. He served as adviser to the Defence Minister of Benin, and as the Defence Attaché at the French embassy in Beirut. He took part to both the UNPROFOR and the IFOR in 1995 and 96, and worked for the implementation of the Dayton Agreement in Sarajevo and Mostar.

In 2000, as a colonel, he headed the Africa and Middle East Division at the Direction du Renseignement Militaire (Military Intelligence Directorate) in Paris.

From July 2001, he was counsellor of the Chef d’état-major des armées (CEMA, Chief of Staff of the French army) for Africa and Middle East.

On 26 January 2004, he took command of the UNIFIL, succeeding to General Lalit Mohan Tewari.

On 25 July 2006, a UN observation post was attacked by Israeli forces after Israel claimed that Hezbollah fired rockets from the area. Israeli forces used both artillery and aerial bombardment in the area. A total of four UN observers were killed, one each from China, Canada, Austria, and Finland.

Following a number of incidents between UN peacekeepers and Israeli fighter jets, Pellegrini warned that the Israeli flights over Lebanon violated the cease fire resolution, and threatened that force may be used to stop the incursions.

On the 2 February 2007 Pellegrini passed the command of the UNIFIL to the Italian General Claudio Graziano.
