= Aroldo Lázaro Sáenz =

Spanish military and UN official (born 1962)

Lieutenant General Aroldo Lázaro Sáenz
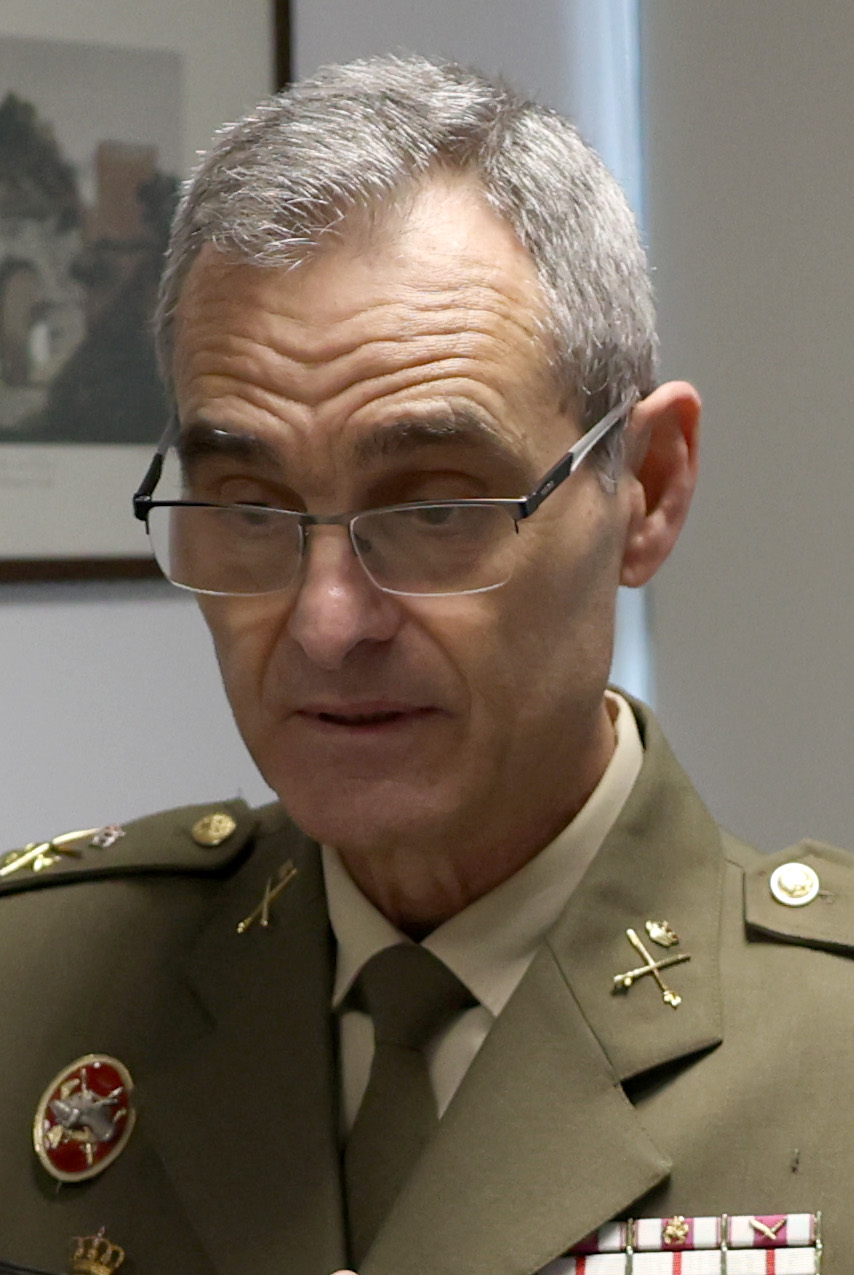
- Lázaro in 2024
- Born: 1962 (age 63–64); Sidi Ifni, Ifni, Spain
- Military career
- Allegiance: Spain
- Branch: Spanish Army
- Service years: 1986–present
- Rank: Lieutenant general
- Commands: Commander of UNIFIL; Commander Guzmán el Bueno brigade Commander of Eurocorps

Lieutenant General Aroldo Lázaro Sáenz (born 1962) is a Spanish military officer who has served as commander of Eurocorps since September 2025. Previously, he served as head of mission and commander of the United Nations Interim Force in Lebanon (UNIFIL) from 2022 to 2025.

== Life ==
Lázaro is the son and grandson of soldiers. He was born in 1962 in Sidi Ifni, which at that moment was under Spanish control as the capital of the Ifni province.

After attending school, Aroldo Lázaro Sáenz completed his training as an officer at the General Military Academy (Academia General Militar) in Zaragoza. He was also a graduate of the Army General Staff Academy (Academia Central de la Defensa) and completed his academic training in the fields of diplomacy, peace and security. During his military career as an officer in the army (Ejército de Tierra) he was a staff officer in a regiment of the "Guzmán el Bueno" X brigade in Cerro Muriano in the Córdoba province. He served as an officer in the headquarters of the European forces EUFOR (European Union Force) and in Valencia with the Rapid Deployable Corps Spain (Rapid Deployable Corps Spain), which is part of the Supreme Headquarters of the Allied NATO forces in Europe SHAPE (Supreme Headquarters Allied Powers Europe). He was also liaison officer in Naqura within the United Nations Interim Force in Lebanon UNIFIL (United Nations Interim Force in Lebanon) as well as Chief of Staff of the force's Eastern Sector. He also completed three deployments in Bosnia and Herzegovina under the command of the United Nations Protection Force (UNPROFOR), the NATO Stabilization Force (SFOR) and the European Union Rapid Operational Force (European Union Rapid Operational Force).

Lázaro Sáenz, who speaks Spanish, English, French and Italian, was an advisor to the Ministry of Defence for cross-sectoral defense and security issues, commander of a regiment of the X Guzmán el Bueno Brigade and commander of the UNIFIL East Sector. As Brigadier General he was commander of the "Guzmán el Bueno" X Brigade.

On 4 February 2022, the Secretary-General of the United Nations, António Guterres, appointed Divisional General Aroldo Lázaro Sáenz as head of the mission and commander of the United Nations Interim Force in Lebanon UNIFIL (United Nations Interim Force in Lebanon), succeeding Major General Stefano Del Col from Italy. In October 2023, he was promoted to Lieutenant General.

In June 2025, his term as head of UNIFIL ended and he handed over command to Italian General Diodato Abagnara. For his services, the Spanish cabinet awarded him the Grand Cross of Military Merit (July 2025) and the Grand Cross of the Order of Isabella the Catholic (September 2025).

On 18 September 2025, Lázaro assumed as commander of Eurocorps.
