= Diodato Abagnara =

Italian Army major general

Major General Diodato Abagnara
- Born: 1970 (age 55–56); Pagani, Salerno, Italy
- Military career
- Allegiance: Italy
- Service: Italian Army
- Service years: 1988-present
- Rank: Major General
- Commands: UNIFIL Sector West; Military Technical Committee for Lebanon (MTC4L); 19th "Cavalleggeri Guide" Regiment
- Awards: Bronze Cross for Army Merit; Silver Cross for Army Merit; Knight of the Military Order of Italy; Knight Grand Cross of the Pontifical Equestrian Order of Saint Sylvester Pope

Diodato Abagnara (1970) is an Italian Army major general who has served as Head of Mission and Force Commander of the United Nations Interim Force in Lebanon (UNIFIL) since 24 June 2025, succeeding Lieutenant General Aroldo Lázaro Sáenz of Spain. With over 36 years of military service, he previously served as Commander of UNIFIL's Sector West from 2018 to 2019 and as Commander and Chairman of the Military Technical Committee for Lebanon (MTC4L), coordinating international support for the Lebanese Armed Forces (LAF). During his military career, he has held several senior appointments within the Italian Armed Forces, including positions as Personnel Division Chief, Adviser to the Chief of Defence Staff, Commander of an infantry brigade, and Chief of the Officers’ Employment Office. Abagnara holds four bachelor's degrees and six master's degrees across fields including political science, international relations, and strategic studies.

== Early life and education ==
Abagnara holds four bachelor's degrees: in Political Science and Strategic Sciences from the University of Turin, in Business Management and Communication from the University of Teramo, and in International and Diplomatic Sciences from the University of Trieste.

He also holds master's degrees in law, Strategic Sciences, International Strategic-Military Studies, Advanced Studies in Intelligence and Security, Cybersecurity and Information Security, and Strategic Leadership and Digital Transformation. His postgraduate studies were undertaken at the University of Turin, the University of Rome, and Luiss Business School in Rome.

Abagnara is also fluent in both English and Italian, and speaks French and Spanish.

== Career ==
Abagnara began his military career in 1988 in the Italian Army as an Armoured Cavalry Officer. Since then he has held a wide range of leadership positions both in Italy and abroad. During his career, Abagnara served in multiple NATO missions in the Balkans, where he led Italian units that were involved in multinational stabilization and peacekeeping operations.

He later served as an Italian Battalion Commander with UNIFIL during the 2008–2009 deployment. An Italian Republic honours record identifies him as Commander of the 1st Squadron Group of the 5th “Lancieri di Novara” Regiment during Operation Leonte 5 in Lebanon, from 8 November 2008 to 24 April 2009.

Between 2013 and 2014, Abagnara served as commander of the 19th “Cavalleggeri Guide” Regiment in Salerno, and according to an official Italian army report he handed over command of his post on 1 August in 2014, after approximately one year in the position.

Later, he returned to Lebanon where he served from 18 October 2018 to 8 May 2019 as Commander of UNIFIL's Sector West. Consequently, leading a multinational force composed of units from 13 countries. Following his 2018–2019 command of UNIFIL's Sector West and prior to his most recent role with the Military Technical Committee for Lebanon (MTC4L), Abagnara held several senior appointments within the Italian Armed Forces. These included Personnel Division Chief, Adviser to the Chief of Defence Staff, Commander of an infantry brigade, Chief of the Officers’ Employment Office, and Chair of the Joint Gender Perspective Council within the Defense General Staff.

From 2024 to 2025, Abagnara Served as Commander and Chairman of the Military Technical Committee for Lebanon (MTC4L), where he coordinated multinational support for the Lebanese Armed Forces (LAF). Following that, he was appointed on 4 June 2025 as the next Head of Mission and Force Commander of UNIFIL, which was announced by the UN Secretary-General António Guterres. On 24 June 2025 he officially assumed the position, succeeding Lieutenant General Aroldo Lázaro Sáenz of Spain.

== Awards ==
Abagnara has received six publicly documented awards and honours during his military career. His earliest publicly documented award was the Bronze Cross for Army Merit, awarded on 28 July 2010 for his service as Commander of the 1st Squadron Group of the 5th Lancieri di Novara regiment during Operation Leonte 5 in Lebanon (November 2008-April 2009).

On 2 June 2012, he was appointed a Knight of the Order of Merit of the Italian Republic, and only three years later, appointed an Officer of the Order of Merit of the Italian Republic on 2 June 2015.

In February 2020, in recognition of his work during his command of UNIFIL's Western Sector, Pope Francis awarded Abagnara the rank of Knight Grand Cross of the Pontifical Equestrian Order of Saint Sylvester Pope, which was followed by the Silver Cross for Army Merit on 17 March 2020, in recognition of his command of the multinational force deployed in UNIFIL's Sector West (18 October 2018 – 8 May 2019).

In 2021, Abagnara was awarded the Knight of the Military Order of Italy. The decoration was presented by President Sergio Mattarella during a formal ceremony at the Quirinale Palace in Rome on 3 November 2021.
