= United Nations Interim Force in Lebanon =

UN peacekeeping mission since 1978

Coordinates: 33°10′N 35°23′E

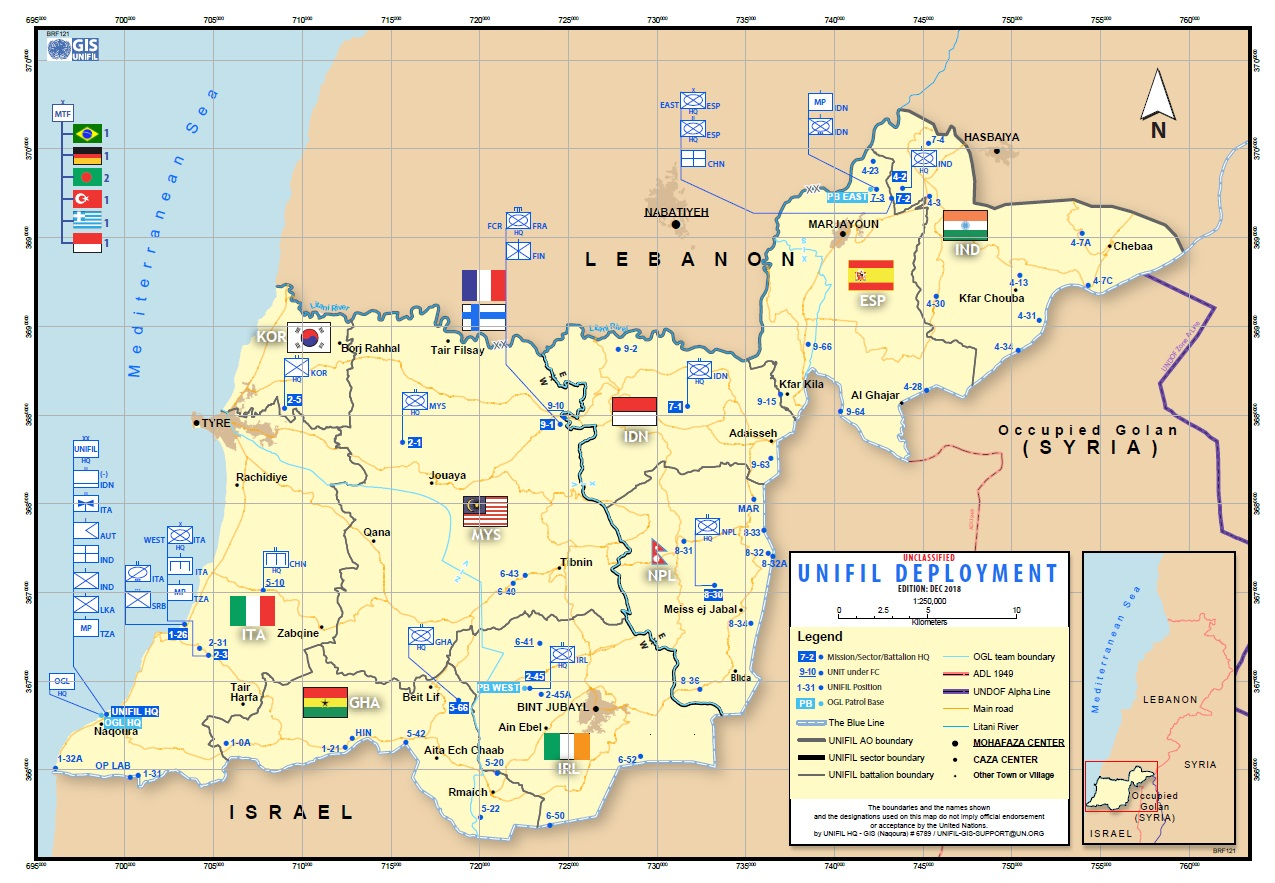
- UNIFIL deployment, as of 2018
- Abbreviation: UNIFIL
- Formation: 19 March 1978; 48 years ago
- Type: Peacekeeping mission
- Legal status: Active
- Headquarters: Naqoura, Lebanon
- Head: Head of Mission and Force Commander; Major General Diodato Abagnara
- Parent organization: United Nations Security Council
- Website: unifil.unmissions.org

The United Nations Interim Force in Lebanon (Arabic: قوة الأمم المتحدة المؤقتة في لبنان; Hebrew: כוח האו"ם הזמני בלבנון), or UNIFIL (Arabic: يونيفيل; Hebrew: יוניפי״ל) is a United Nations peacekeeping mission established on 19 March 1978 by United Nations Security Council Resolutions 425 and 426, and resolution 1701 in 2006 to restore peace and security along the Israel-Lebanon border.

UNIFIL was established as a result of the 1978 Israeli invasion of Lebanon at a time of Palestinian insurgency in South Lebanon and the Lebanese Civil War. The UNIFIL mandate had to be adjusted due to the Israeli invasion of Lebanon in 1982 and after the Israeli withdrawal from Lebanon in 2000. Following the 2006 Lebanon War, the United Nations Security Council enhanced UNIFIL and added additional tasks to the mandate, such as aiding displaced persons.

UNIFIL's mandate is renewed annually by the United Nations Security Council; it was most recently extended on 28 August 2025 with the passing of UNSCR 2790 which set out the final extension of the mission's mandate until 31 December 2026, with its drawdown and withdrawal to then take place throughout 2027. The UNSC called for the full implementation of Resolution 1701, including full respect for the Blue Line and full cessation of hostilities.

As of 2026 UNIFIL is composed of 7,565 personnel from 46 nations, tasked with monitoring the cessation of hostilities and helping ensure humanitarian access to the civilian population. Its funding is approved on an annual basis by the General Assembly. It has a budget of $553 million for the fiscal year 2025 to 2026.

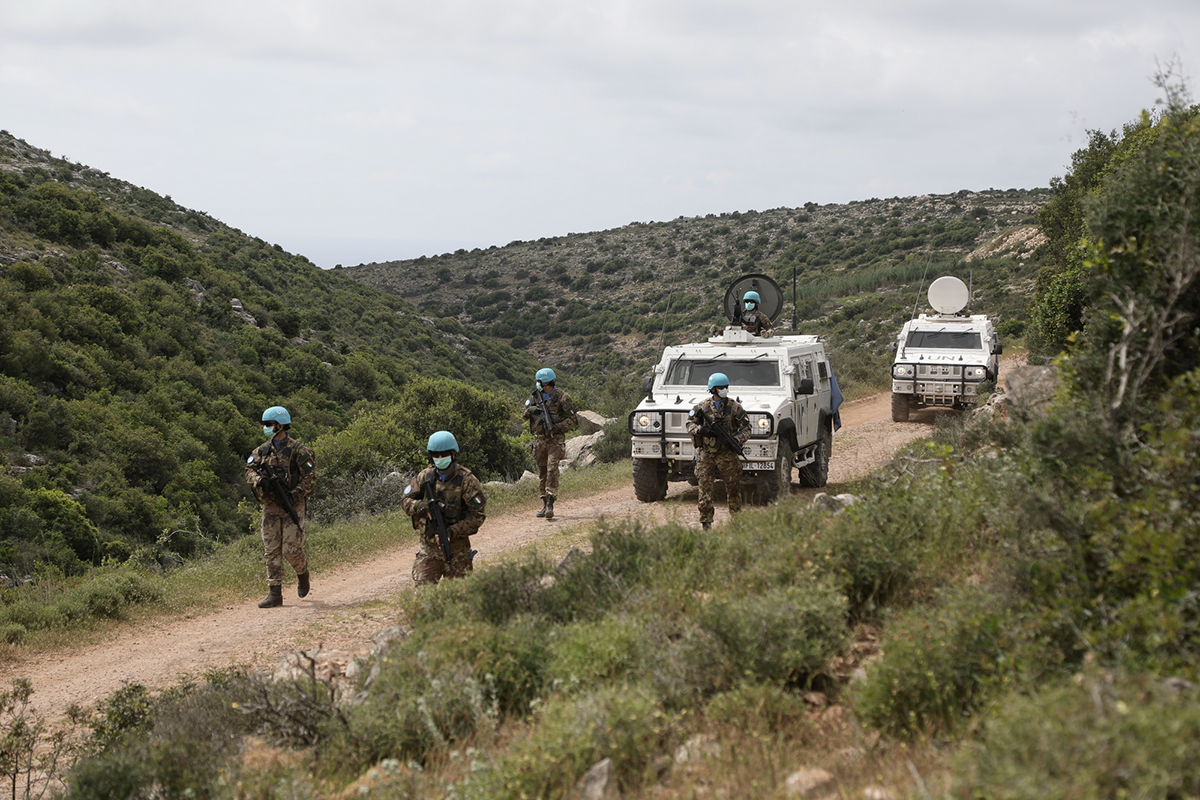
Italian Army Mechanized Brigade "Granatieri di Sardegna" squad patrolling the Blue Line in 2020

== Mandate ==
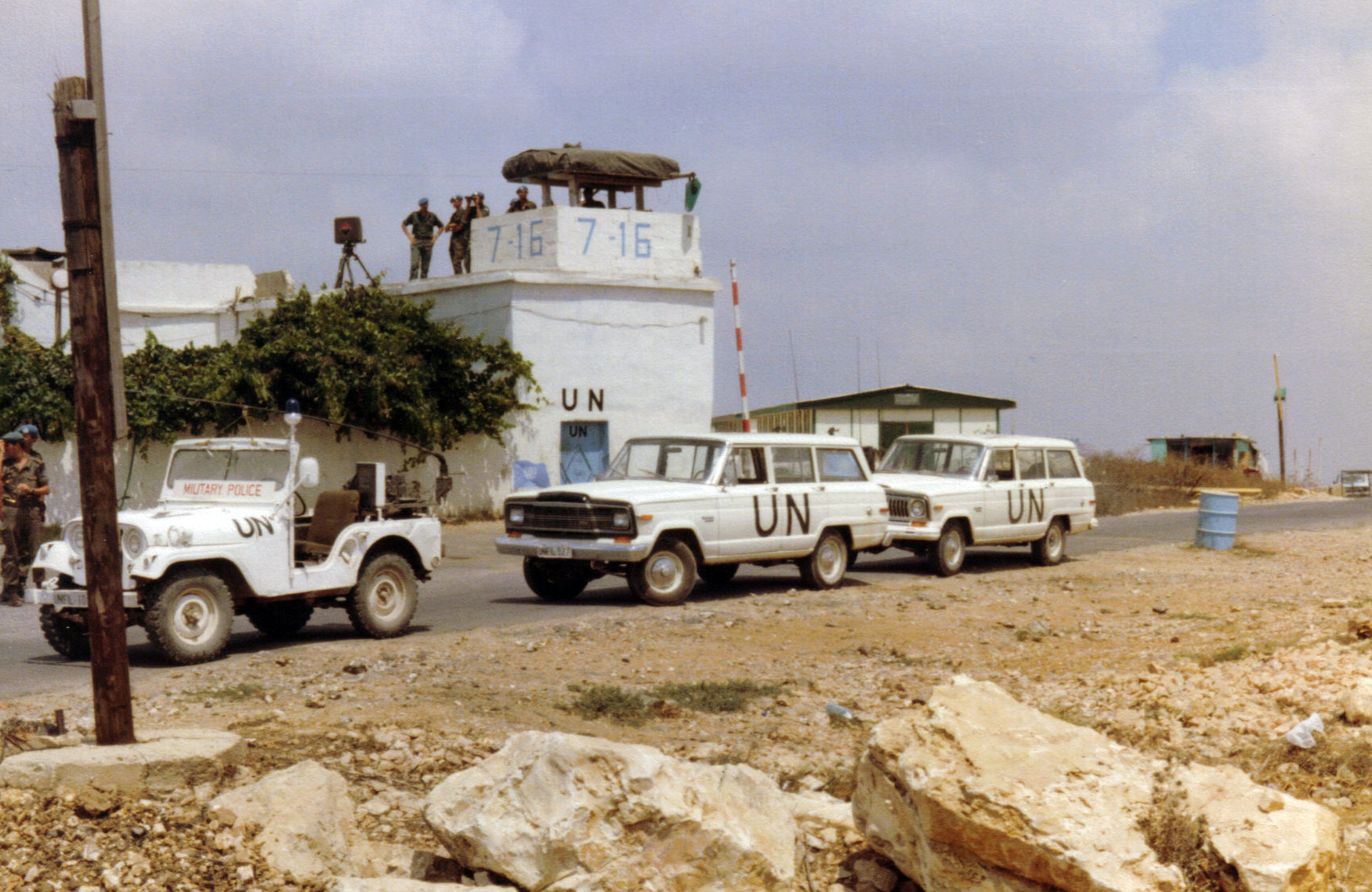
Dutch UNIFIL base, 1981

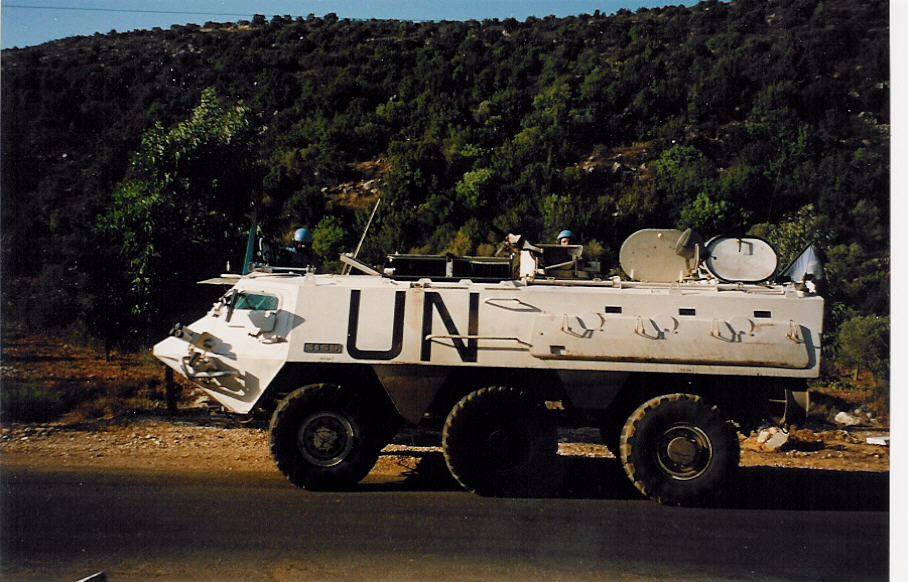
A Finnish XA-180 with UNIFIL in 1998

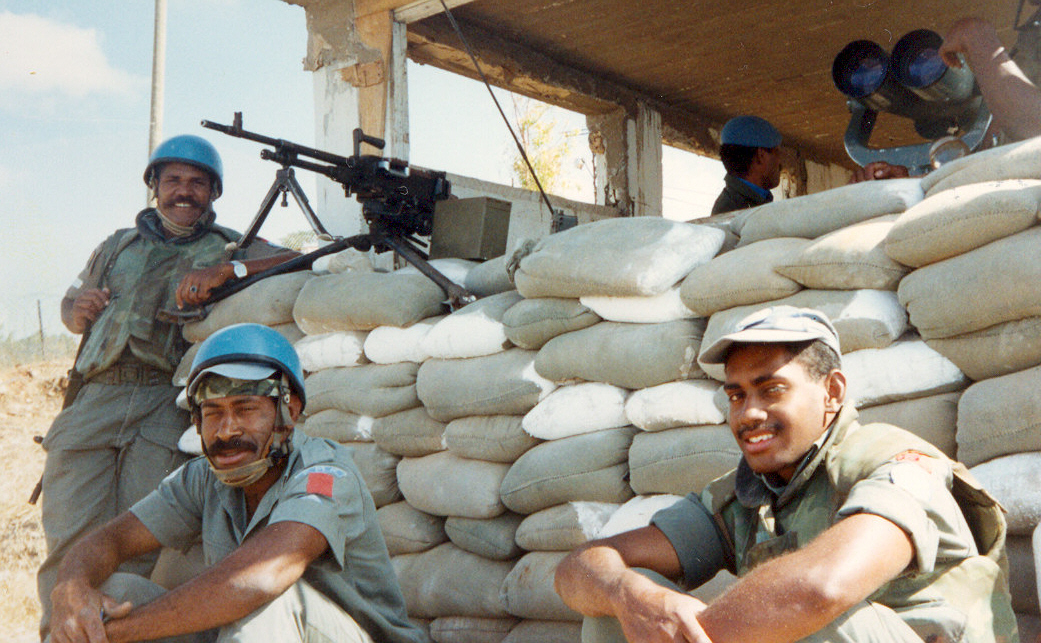
Fijian soldiers visiting a UNIFIL OP during a patrol in 1989

According to its Mandate, established by United Nations Security Council Resolutions 425 and 426 in 1978, UNIFIL is tasked with the following objectives:

- confirm the withdrawal of Israeli forces from southern Lebanon.
- restore international peace and security.
- assist the Government of Lebanon in ensuring the return of its effective authority in the area.

In addition, several further Security Council resolutions have reaffirmed and expanded the mission's mandate, including:

- 31 January 2006: SC Resolution 1655
- 31 July 2006: SC Resolution 1697
- 11 August 2006: SC Resolution 1701

Under SC Resolution 1701, UNIFIL's mandate was expanded, giving it new duties:

- Monitor the cessation of hostilities.
- Accompany and support the Lebanese armed forces as they deploy throughout the South, including along the Blue Line, as Israel withdraws its armed forces from Lebanon.
- Coordinate its activities referred to in the preceding paragraph (above) with the Government of Lebanon and the Government of Israel.
- Extend its assistance to help ensure humanitarian access to civilian populations and the voluntary and safe return of displaced persons.
- Assist the Lebanese Armed Forces (LAF) in taking steps towards the establishment between the Blue Line and the Litani river of an area free of any armed personnel, assets and weapons other than those of the Government of Lebanon and of UNIFIL deployed in this area.
- Assist the Government of Lebanon, at its request, in securing its borders and other entry points to prevent the entry in Lebanon without its consent of arms or related materiel.

In addition, UNIFIL was also authorized to:

- ensure that its area of operations is not utilized for hostile activities of any kind;
- resist attempts by forceful means to prevent it from discharging its duties under the mandate of the Security Council; and
- protect United Nations personnel, facilities, installations and equipment, ensure the security and freedom of movement of United Nations personnel, humanitarian workers and, without prejudice to the responsibility of the Government of Lebanon, to protect civilians under imminent threat of physical violence.

== History ==
The first UNIFIL troops deployed in the area on 23 March 1978 were redeployed from other UN peacekeeping operations in the region, the (United Nations Emergency Force, the United Nations Truce Supervision Organization, and the United Nations Disengagement Observer Force Zone). They were deployed after Israel launched an invasion of Lebanon earlier in the month, in response to Palestinian militants hijacking a bus on the Coastal Highway of Israel and murdered its occupants in across border raid from Lebanon.

UNIFIL built its headquarters in Naqoura close to the Lebanese-Israeli border. The majority of the force's initial personnel were provided by Canada, Iran and Sweden, with support from France, Nepal and Norway. The initial force consists of 4,000 troops. This was increased to 6,000 in May 1978.

Israeli forces withdrew from the area on 13 June 1978, after which the Free Lebanon Army under Saad Haddad remained in the area. On April 18, 1979, Haddad proclaimed the area under his control the "Independent Free Lebanon". The following day, he was branded a traitor by the Lebanese government and officially dismissed from the Lebanese Army. Part of the Army of Free Lebanon returned to government control, while Haddad's part split away and was renamed the South Lebanon Army (SLA) in May 1980.

UNIFIL began patrolling operations and established a series of positions, including checkpoints, roadblocks and observation posts. UNIFIL operations during this time were hindered by restrictions that were imposed on its freedom of movement and a lack of cooperation by all parties to the conflict. There were several attacks on its personnel, including ambushes, kidnappings, shelling and sniping. As a result, only limited progress was made in fulfilling its mandate between 1978 and 1982. During the occupation, UNIFIL's function was mainly to provide humanitarian aid amidst the Lebanese Civil War.

=== Lebanese Civil War (until 1990) ===
Before the second Israeli invasion of Lebanon, on 2 January 1982 two Ghanaian soldiers guarding a UNIFIL position were attacked by unidentified persons and one of the soldiers was shot and subsequently died. In February 1982, the force was increased by a further 1,000 troops. During the 1982 Lebanon War, commencing on 6 June 1982, Israeli forces advanced into south Lebanon. Despite being ordered to block the advance, the UN positions were either bypassed or overrun, primarily by the SLA forces under Saad Haddad.

The SLA was the main Lebanese paramilitary force supported by the Israel Defense Forces (IDF) in southern Lebanon. The UN force was overwhelmed within a day. At least one Norwegian peacekeeper was killed in the initial attack. Following this, UNIFIL focused primarily on the distribution of aid and medical support. A new peacekeeping force, the Multinational Force in Lebanon was also created and deployed in Beirut until it was withdrawn in March 1984.

=== South Lebanon conflict (until 2000) ===
Beginning in 1985, Israel scaled back its permanent positions in Lebanon, although the IDF maintained some forces in Southern Lebanon, along with the SLA, to establish a security zone to prevent attacks on Israel from Lebanon. These forces were engaged by several groups, including Hezbollah.

UNIFIL's role during this time was limited mainly to manning checkpoints and undertaking patrols, as its operations were constrained by the Israeli security zone in the south. Its personnel were attacked by elements on both sides of the conflict during this time, and financial issues also hampered UNIFIL operations as some UN member states withheld funding for the operation. In 1986, the force was reorganised when France decreased its contribution to UNIFIL. There was a proposal to convert the force into an observation group around this time, although this was ultimately rejected.

The period saw the 1993 Seven-Day War in Lebanon, and in 1996, south Lebanon was bombarded by the Israeli army, air force, and navy for seventeen days. According to Amnesty International, during the 1996 bombardment, UNIFIL compounds and vehicles came under Israeli aircraft or artillery fire 270 times. This included the shelling of the Fijian UNIFIL compound near Qana where 102 villagers sheltering were killed.

In April 2000, Israel notified the UN Secretary General that it was withdrawing from south Lebanon. This process was completed by June 2000. After this, UNIFIL was able to resume its military tasks along the "Blue Line (withdrawal line)" (a demarcation line dividing Lebanon from Israel) and the adjacent areas, where UNIFIL sought to maintain the ceasefire through patrols, observation from fixed positions, and close contact between Lebanese Armed Forces (LAF), as well as providing humanitarian assistance to the local population.

=== Conflict in 2006 ===
According to UNIFIL press releases, there were dozens of incidents of UN posts coming under fire during the 2006 Lebanon War by Israeli forces. In his 21 July 2006 report about the UNIFIL activities 21 January – 18 July 2006, the Secretary-General of the United Nations Kofi Annan stated that "Some Hezbollah positions remained in close proximity to United Nations positions, especially in the Hula area, posing a significant security risk to United Nations personnel and equipment."

==== Combat-related incidents ====
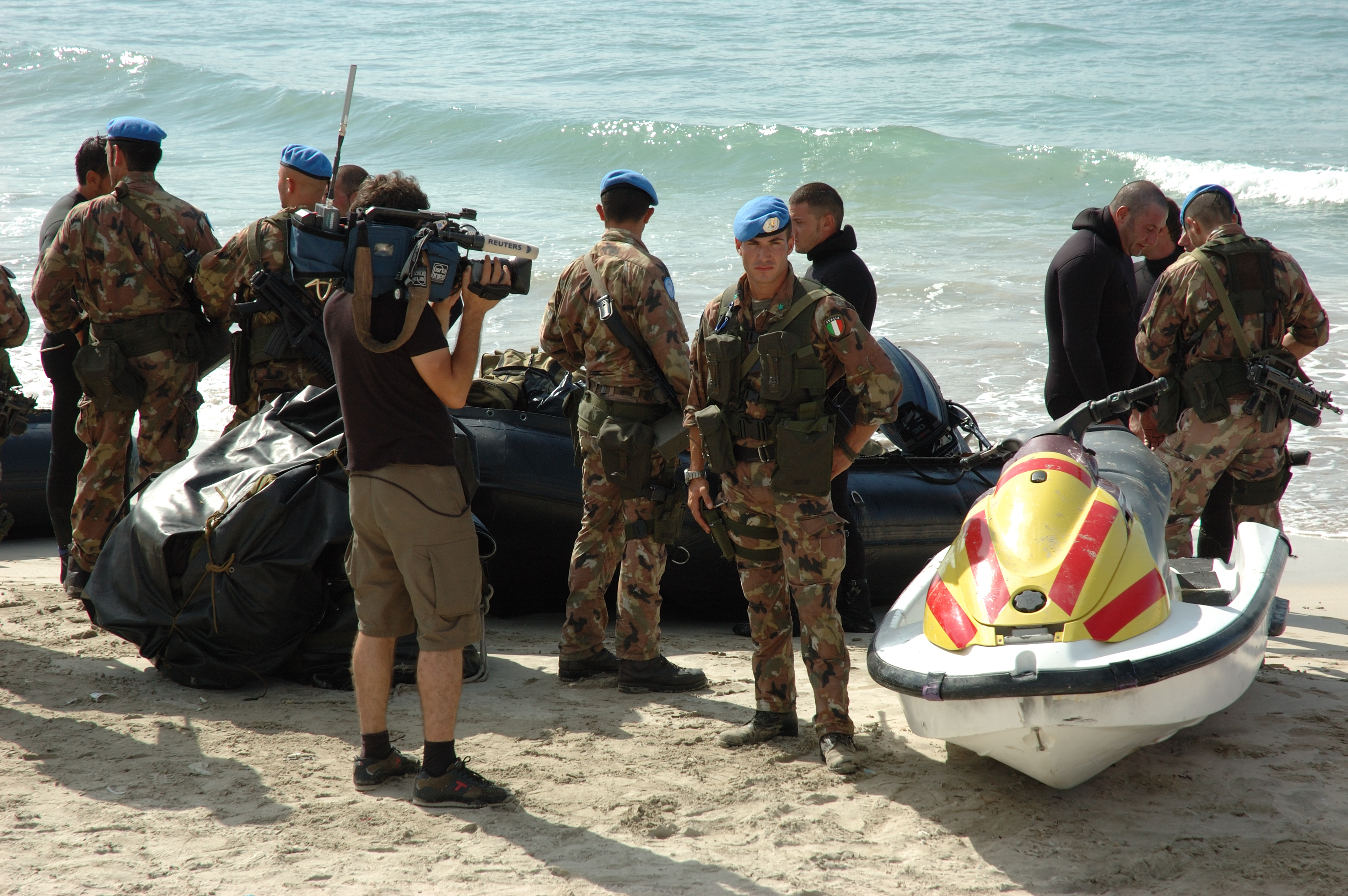
Italian UN soldiers arriving in Lebanon, 2006

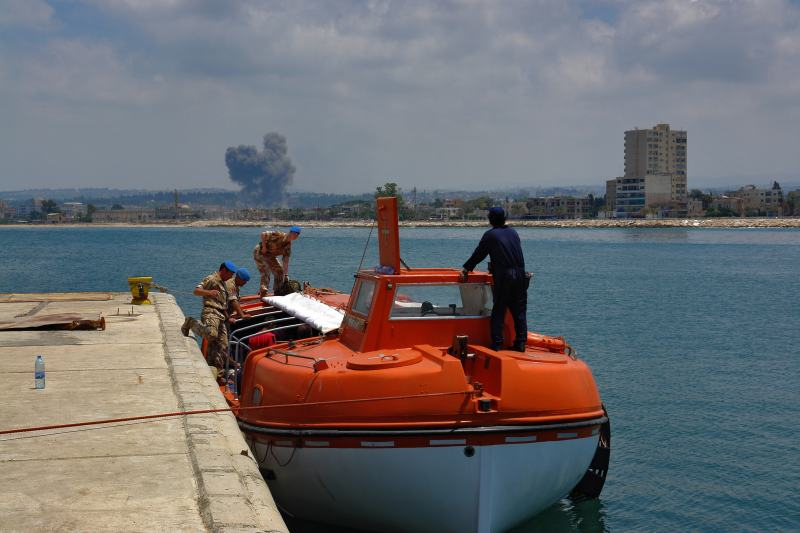
UNIFIL soldiers and staff from the MV Serenade evacuate refugees from Tyre, 20 July 2006

- On 17 July, a UNIFIL international staff member and his wife were killed when Israeli aircraft bombed the Hosh District of Tyre, Lebanon.
- On 23 July, Hezbollah fire wounded an Italian observer.
- On 25 July, Hezbollah opened small arms fire at a UNIFIL convoy, forcing it to retreat.
- On 25 July, four soldiers from the Ghanaian battalion were lightly injured after an Israeli tank shell hit a UNIFIL position during fighting in Southern Lebanon on 24 July 2006.
- Shrapnel from tank shells fired by the IDF seriously wounded an Indian soldier on 16 July 2006.
- On 25 July, four UNTSO observers from Austria, Canada, China and Finland were killed by Israeli strikes on an OGL (Observer Group Lebanon) patrol base near Khiam in southern Lebanon. According to the UN, the Israelis stated they were responding to "Hezbollah fire from that vicinity" and the four had taken shelter in a bunker under the post. The area around the site was hit by a precision guided bomb from an Israeli jet and shelled a total of 14 times by Israeli artillery throughout the day despite warning calls made by UN personnel to the IDF. However, General Alain Pellegrini, then commander of UNIFIL, claims that he attempted to call Israeli officials "five or six times", but never got past their secretaries. Later, Israeli artillery shelling resumed as a rescue team tried to clear the rubble.
- On 29 July, two Indian soldiers were wounded when their post was damaged during an Israeli airstrike in Southern Lebanon.
- On 6 August, a Hezbollah rocket hit the headquarters of the Chinese UNIFIL contingent, wounding three Chinese soldiers.
- On 12 August, a Ghanaian soldier was wounded when Israeli artillery shelled the area near the village of Haris.

=== From August 2006 ===
==== Visit by Secretary-General ====
In order to stress the importance of implementing United Nations Security Council Resolution 1701, UN Secretary-General Annan himself paid a visit to UNIFIL on the ground in August 2006.

==== Reinforcements ====
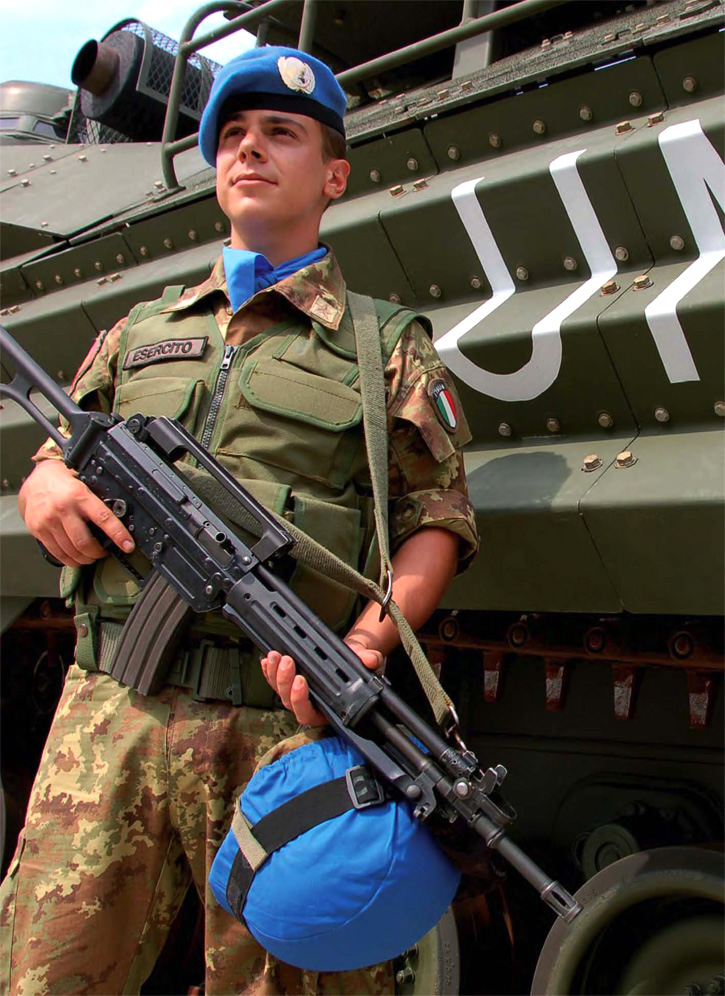
A soldier from the Italian Army stands guard during the UNIFIL mission in 2007

By July 2006, UNIFIL's strength had dropped to its lowest, with only 1,980 personnel deployed. Following the UN-brokered ceasefire, UNIFIL received a large number of reinforcements, up to 15,000 personnel, and heavy equipment. France committed to increase its complement from 400 to 2,000 men and send Leclerc main battle tanks and AMX 30 AuF1 self-propelled artillery, in addition to the forces deployed in Opération Baliste. Italy committed to deploying 3,000 troops, while Qatar offered to send between 200 and 300 troops. As the French were preparing to deploy, French commander of UNIFIL Alain Pellegrini and the country's foreign minister, Philippe Douste-Blazy, stated that France would not intervene to disarm Hezbollah.

A naval component of UNIFIL was set up to assist the Lebanese Navy as an interim measure to prevent arms proliferation to Hezbollah while the Lebanese Navy builds its capacity. For a period the force was German-led under the command of a German admiral before handing over to the Italians.

The Indonesian contingent received 12 VAB (Véhicule de l'Avant Blindé) on 17 February 2007, as part of the second wave of shipments from the agreement between the French and Indonesian governments. Among the equipment sent with the second wave of VABs were 10 tool boxes (pioneering equipment), 10 armored vehicle radio communications units, HMG (Heavy Machine Gun) shooter shields, and 40 water jerrycans.

On 16 March 2009, KRI Diponegoro, an Indonesian Sigma-class corvette joined the UNIFIL Naval Task Force. In August 2010, two Indonesian soldiers were criticized after they escaped from clashes between Israel and Lebanon by fleeing in a taxi.

The Israeli Ambassador to the UN, Ambassador Dan Gillerman, met with UNIFIL commander, Maj.-Gen. Claudio Graziano, on 15 August 2008, after Israel was accused of unilaterally violating United Nations Security Council Resolution 1701 by the almost daily overflights of Lebanese airspace, the continued occupation of the village of Ghajar, and Israel's refusal to submit maps of areas on which it dropped cluster munitions during the 2006 Lebanese war.

Following the war, British military historian John Keegan predicted that Israel would in the future invade Lebanon and continue attacking until Hezbollah's system of tunnels and bunkers was destroyed, as Israel would not tolerate a "zone of invulnerability" occupied by a sworn enemy, or a double threat posed by Hezbollah and Hamas rockets, and that Israel might first attack the Gaza Strip. Keegan noted that any IDF entry into Southern Lebanon would risk provoking a clash with UNIFIL, but that it is unlikely to deter Israel, as it tends to behave with "extreme ruthlessness" when national survival is at stake.

Many troops, including the Finnish, Irish, Qataris and Indonesians, pulled out of UNIFIL in 2007–2008. Some of these nations had been there for over 30 years (the Irish and Finnish), and one of the reasons for the withdrawal was reportedly concerns about the changing rules of engagement following the arrival of NATO forces in August 2006 and because of high-level German and French statements expressing unlimited support to the Israeli side.

In November 2009, the Polish military contingent of UNIFIL had begun withdrawal. The process of withdrawing Polish forces ended on December 11, 2009, when the last units of the liquidation group left Lebanon.

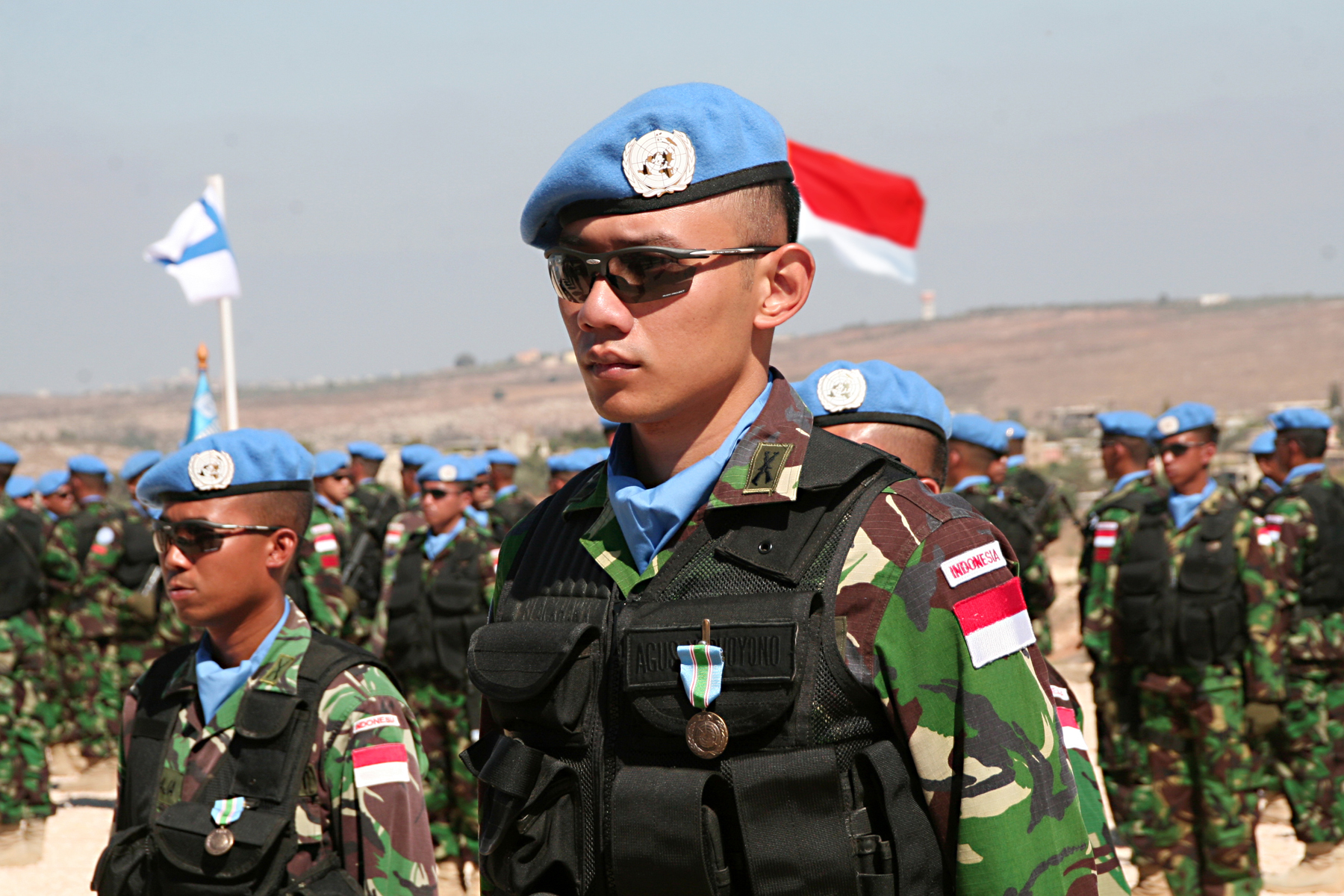
Indonesian National Armed Forces UNIFIL peacekeepers, 2007

In 2010, a series of standoffs and clashes erupted between UNIFIL troops and Lebanese villagers in the border region. Villagers accused French peacekeepers of provocative and intrusive patrols, and of taking pictures of people inside their homes. People of Aitaroun town, Marjayoun, accused the French regiments of driving their heavy vehicles through their two-month-old tobacco fields, which support many families. UNIFIL was also accused of having stepped up its patrols and of failing to coordinate with the Lebanese Army.

In July 2010, the most serious incident occurred when the French regiments decided to carry out exercises unilaterally, without Lebanese units or other regiments. When they went into the narrow alleys of Lebanese villages, some residents first tried to redirect them out of their private areas. The French fired against the civilians, arrested a youth driving a motorcycle, and destroyed the vehicle. When other civilians saw that, they surrounded and attacked the UNIFIL French troops without any weapons.

The vehicles' windows were smashed by stones from dozens of civilians of all ages, and the French commander was wounded. The French troops were forcibly disarmed by the villagers, and weapons were then handed over to the Lebanese Army. The French unit could not explain why they behaved unilaterally. Their ambassador to the UN said the civilian attack "was not spontaneous".

At the request of the United Nations, 7,000 additional Lebanese soldiers were deployed to South Lebanon as approved by the Lebanese Cabinet.

==== UNIFIL force in 2010 Israel–Lebanon border clash ====
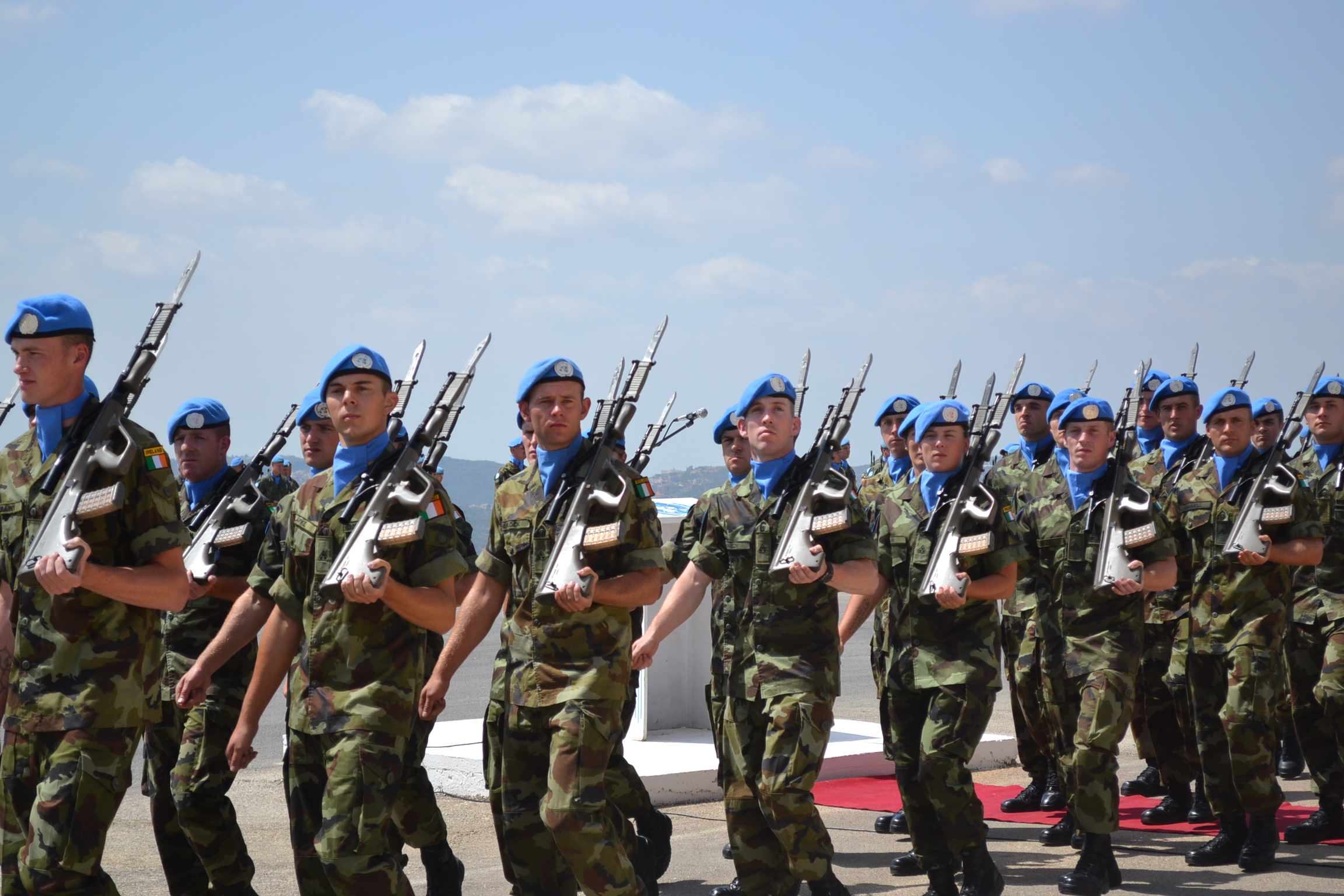
Irish Army peacekeepers during an inspection while serving with UNIFIL on 19 September 2013.

The 2010 Israel–Lebanon border clash occurred on 3 August 2010. It was the deadliest incident along the border since the devastating 2006 Lebanon War. The UN force stationed in southern Lebanon urged "maximum restraint" following the clashes along the so-called Blue Line, a UN-drawn border separating Lebanon from Israel. UNIFIL peacekeepers were in the area where the clashes took place. United Nations peacekeepers tried to hold off the routine Israeli tree-pruning that led to a deadly border clash with Lebanese soldiers. An Indonesian UN battalion was on the scene, and they did their best to try to prevent it, but they were unable to.

Indonesian peacekeepers tried to no avail to calm the situation before the clashes erupted. The fighting increasingly intensified, so the small contingent of UNIFIL forces was ordered to retreat or find cover and then report back to the base. The Indonesian contingent, under intense small arms fire and shelling between the two opposing forces, retreated and returned to their base, but two soldiers fell behind and briefly became isolated before the stunned and exhausted soldiers were helped by some locals.

UN peacekeepers did not escape the confrontation unscathed. Local TV reported that in some cases, villagers attempted to block UNIFIL vehicles from fleeing the combat zone, demanding that they return and fight. However, current and former UNIFIL officials said that at that point in the conflict, it was out of peacekeepers' hands. One former UNIFIL official explained that he has been in these situations before, and when the opposing sides are determined to shoot at each other, there is nothing the UNIFIL force can do. Regarding concerns about UNIFIL's neutrality, a former UNIFIL commander highlighted the importance of perception, stating that if UNIFIL forces intervened to protect the IDF, UNIFIL would be accused by Hezbollah or the Lebanese people of protecting the Israelis. On the other hand, if UNIFIL forces were seen to favour the Lebanese, Israel would accuse UNIFIL of collaborating with Hezbollah.

=== Post-2006 deployment ===
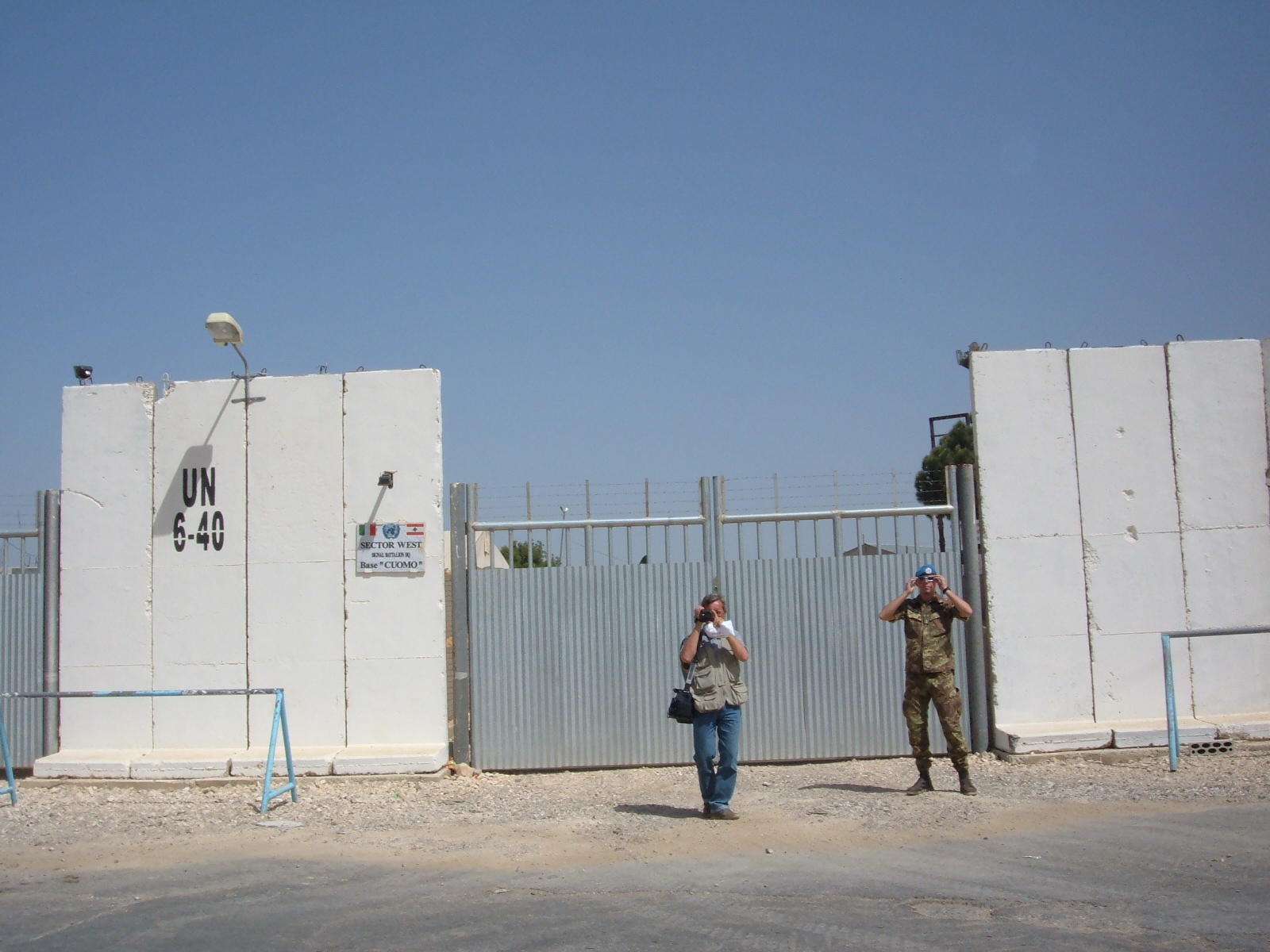
UNIFIL base

Post 2006, UNIFIL was deployed throughout Southern Lebanon, south of the Litani River, and primarily along the United Nations-drawn Blue Line, the border between Israel and Lebanon. Since then, the force's activities have centered around monitoring military activity between Hezbollah and the Israel Defense Forces to reduce tensions and allay tension along the border. UNIFIL has played an important role in clearing landmines, assisting displaced persons and providing humanitarian assistance to civilians in the underdeveloped region of Southern Lebanon.

Under UN Security Council Resolution 1701, which passed as a result of the 2006 Lebanon War, its mandate and rules of engagement changed. The mandate changed to allow up to 15,000 personnel in order to assist the Lebanese Armed Forces in deploying in Southern Lebanon to implement the Lebanese government's sovereignty. The rules of engagement changed to allow the troops to open fire in certain cases: mostly in cases of self-defense but also to protect civilians, UN personnel and facilities.

The new resolution states that UNIFIL can "take all the necessary action in areas of deployment of its forces, and as it deems necessary with its capabilities, to ensure that its area of operations is not utilized for hostile activities of any kind". On 27 August 2006, United Nations Secretary-General Kofi Annan said that UNIFIL would not intercept arms shipments from Syria, unless requested to do so by Lebanon.

In June 2007, six peacekeepers (three Spanish and three Colombian) were killed when a car bomb targeted their armoured vehicle on the road between Khiyam and Marjayoun.

In January 2015, peacekeeper Corporal Francisco Javier Soria Toledo of the Spanish army was killed by Israeli artillery fire during an exchange with Hezbollah in the Shebaa Farms area.

In December 2022, UNIFIL peacekeeper Private Seán Rooney from Ireland was killed when his convoy was attacked and fired upon in Al-Aqbieh. Six members of Hezbollah were later sentenced by a Lebanese military tribunal for the killing.

=== Maritime Task Force ===
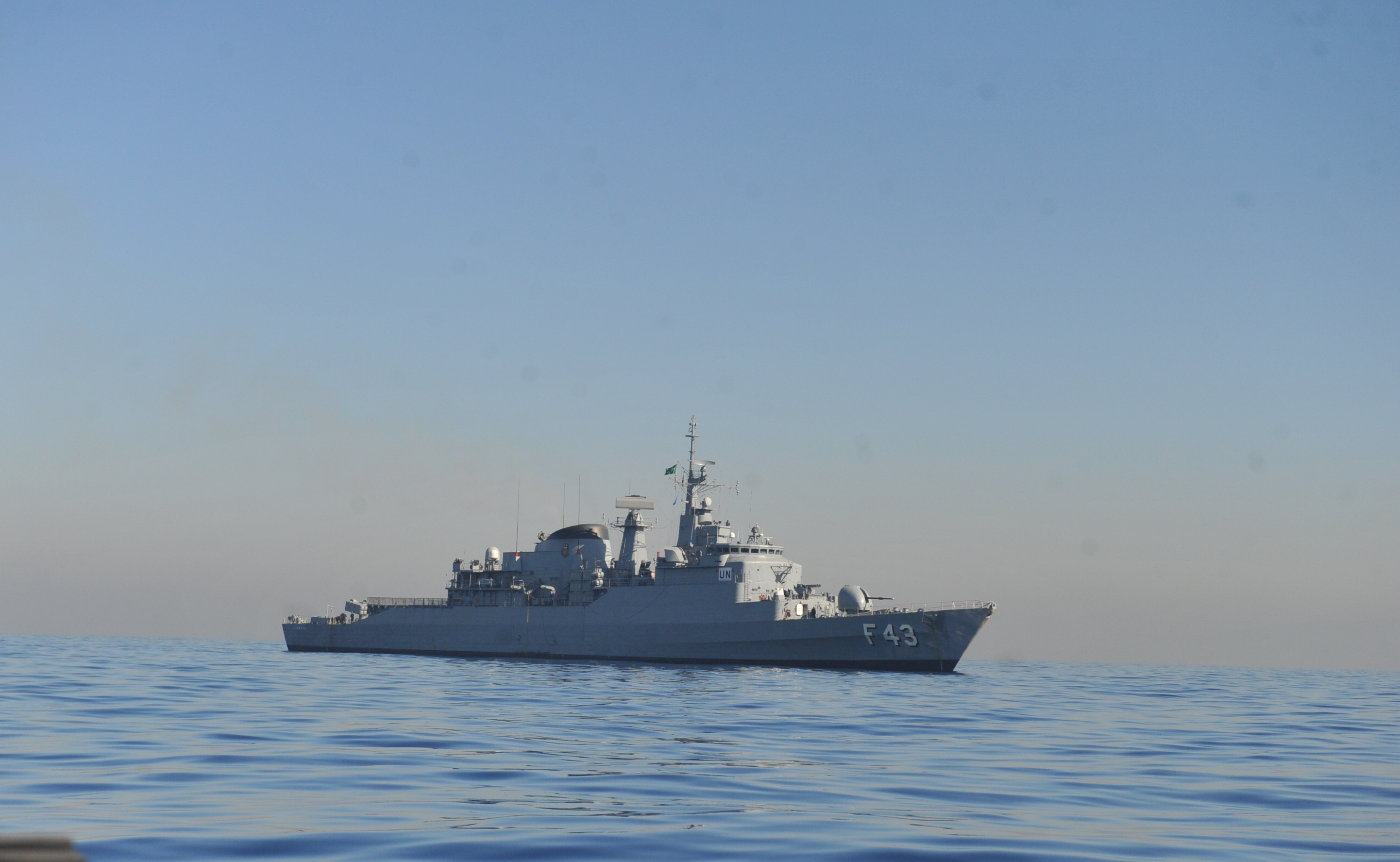
Liberal sailing as flagship of the UNIFIL MTF, 2014

The Maritime Task Force (MTF) is the naval component of the United Nations Interim Force in Lebanon (UNIFIL). As of February 2012, the MTF was under the command of Rear Admiral Wagner Lopes de Moraes Zamith of Brazil. The Brazilian frigate Constituição is the flagship of the fleet comprising vessels from Bangladesh, Brazil, Germany, Greece, Indonesia and Turkey.

After the 2006 Lebanon War, the UNIFIL Maritime Task Force (MTF) was established to assist the Lebanese Naval Forces in preventing the smuggling of illegal shipments in general and armament shipments in particular. With its establishment in October 2006, the force was led by the German Navy which was also the major contributor to the force. The Germans lead the MTF up until 29 February 2008 when they passed control over to EUROMARFOR – a force made up of ships from Portugal, Spain, Italy and France, of which the latter three countries sent vessels to the force in Lebanon.

=== Personnel ===
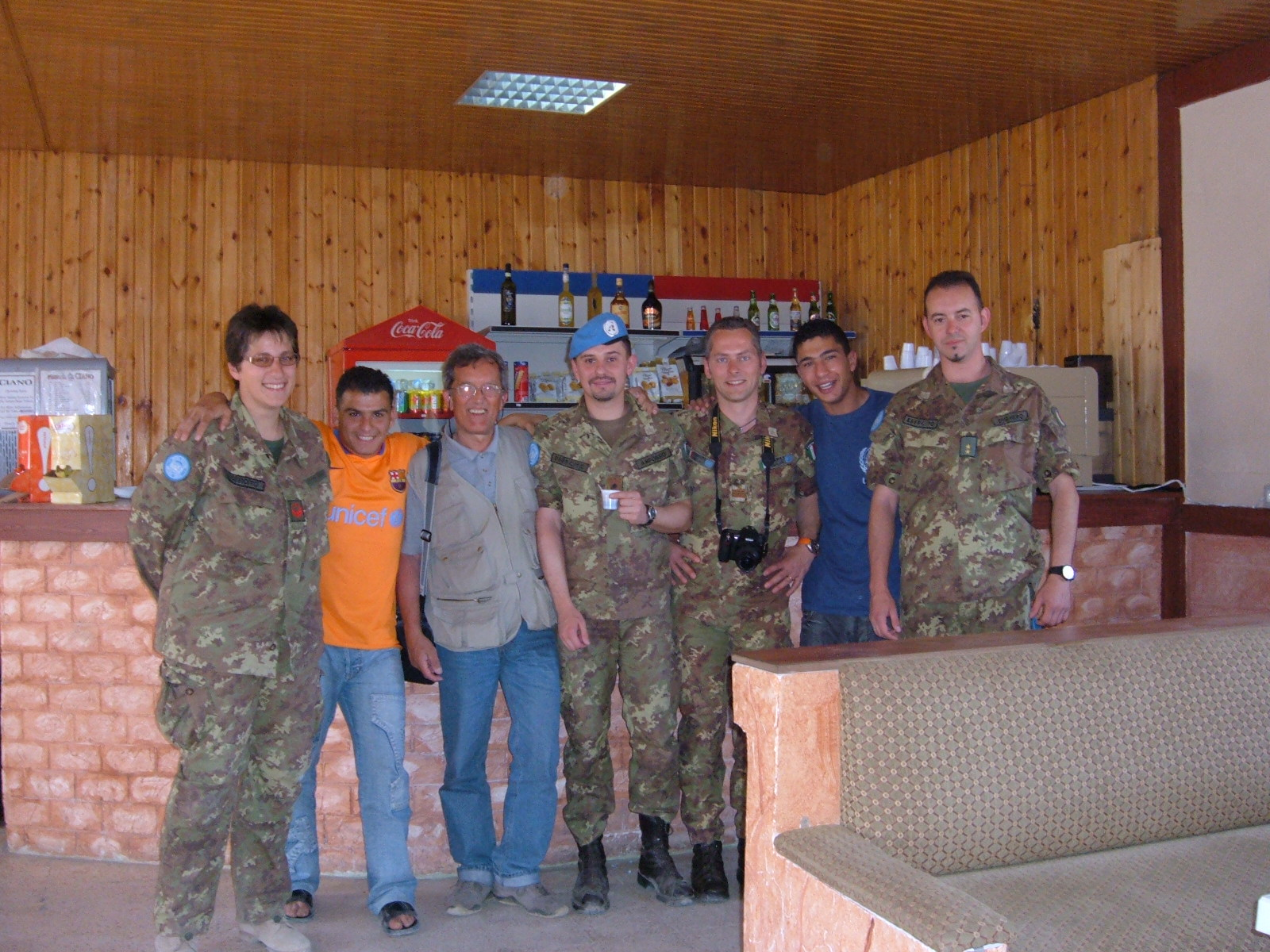
C.I.S.S. humanitarian staff with Italian UNIFIL soldiers in Lebanon

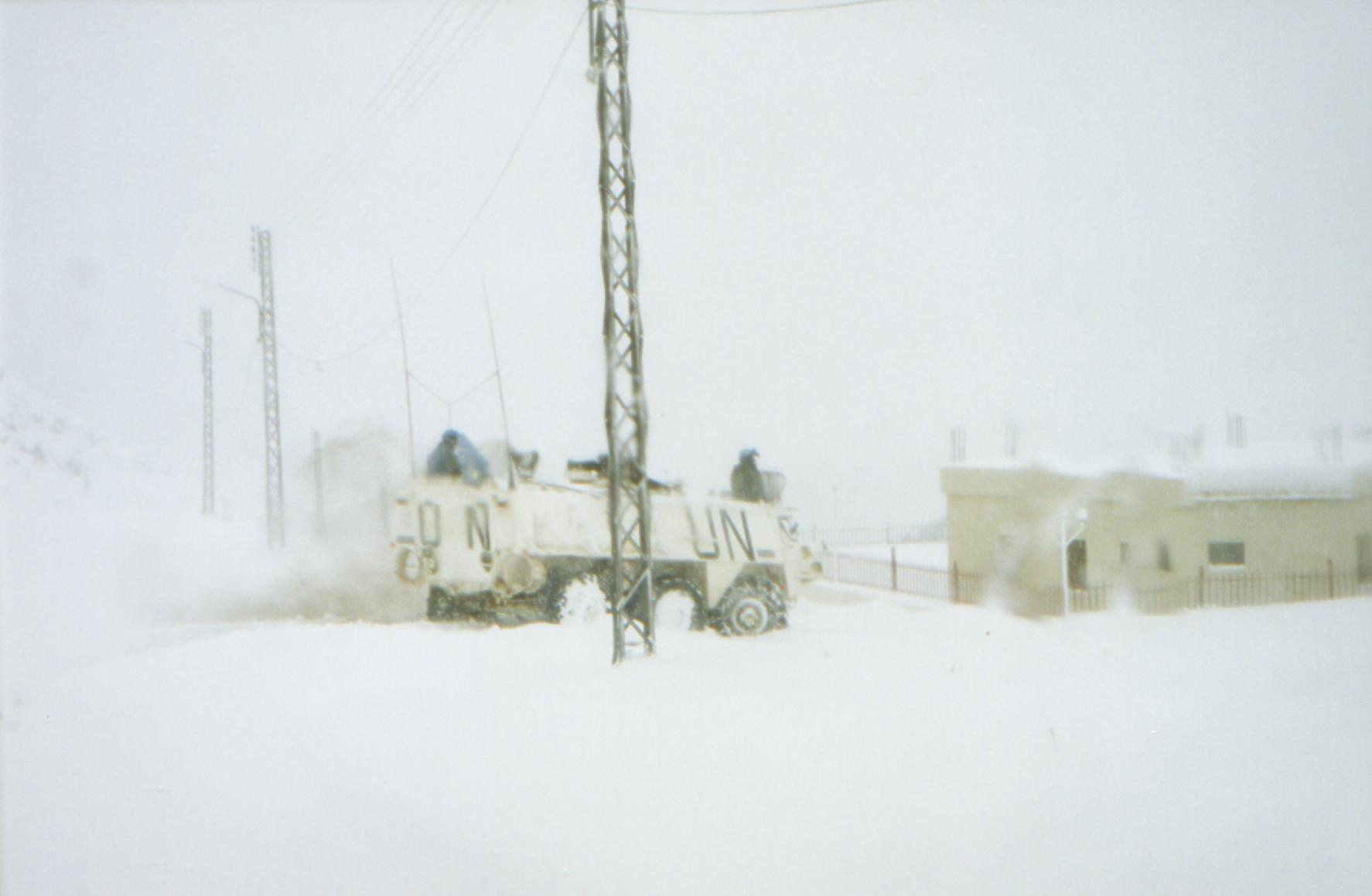
UNIFIL Sisu Pasi in the snow, close to the Israeli border in South-Lebanon, 1998

As of 19 June 2018, UNIFIL employed 10,480 military personnel, including 500 women, from 41 countries. It is supported by 239 international civilian staff, including 78 women, and 583 national civilian staff, including 153 women. It is led by Spanish Major General Aroldo Lázaro Sáenz.

The UNIFIL military component also includes a contingent from Kazakhstan. The Kazakh peacekeeping forces joined the mission for the first time in late 2018. A total of 120 soldiers from Kazakhstan were deployed as part of the Indian battalion in Lebanon on 31 October 2018.

In 2019, UNSC resolution 2485 extended the mission's mandate until August 2020 and reduced the troop ceiling from 15,000 to 13,000.

In November 2019, after ten years of absence, the Polish military contingent returned.

=== Protecting cultural heritage ===
In April 2019, the United Nations Interim Force deployed a cultural asset in Lebanon with Blue Shield International. It was shown that cultural property protection (carried out by military and civil specialists) forms the basis for the future peaceful and economic development of a city, region or country in many conflict zones. The need for training and coordination of the military and civilian participants, including the increased involvement of the local population, became apparent, especially at World Heritage Sites. The connection between cultural user disruption and causes of flight was explained by the President of Blue Shield International, Karl von Habsburg, who stated: "Cultural assets are part of the identity of the people who live in a certain place. If you destroy their culture, you also destroy their identity. Many people are uprooted, often have no prospects anymore and subsequently flee from their homeland."

=== 2023 Israel–Hezbollah conflict ===
Israel and Hezbollah have exchanged fire across the Israel-Lebanon border since 8 October 2023. Hezbollah has fired rockets at targets in Israel, while the IDF has struck targets in Lebanon with artillery and drones.

=== 2024 Israeli invasion of Lebanon ===
On 17 and 18 September 2024, Israel attacked Hezbollah members with bombs concealed inside pagers and other small electronic devices. On 20 September, an IDF airstrike hit Beirut. Similar bombardments followed throughout the rest of September.

On the evening of 30 September, the IDF invaded southern Lebanon with approximately 45,000 troops, while air strikes on Beirut and other targets throughout Lebanon continued. UNIFIL forces did not intervene, and remained in their positions. On 4 October, IDF told Irish UNIFIL personnel to withdraw from one of their positions. Representatives of the peacekeeping mission and the Irish government declined.

Due to the intensive military operations of Israel against Hezbollah in southern Lebanon, 150 Polish soldiers from the 9th rotation could not return to the country and had to wait in shelters until the conflict escalated. By November 1, all Polish soldiers from the 9th rotation had returned to Poland.

In the evening of 9 October, IDF soldiers "deliberately fired at and disabled" the video surveillance system at UNP 1-31 base, the lighting system, and a radio repeater at UNP 1-32A base with small arms fire, according to the UN. On 10 October 2024, Israeli troops opened fire on three UNIFIL positions in South Lebanon, including UNIFIL's main base at Naqoura. Two Indonesian personnel were injured after an Israeli tank fired on an observation tower. The same day, Israel demanded the immediate withdrawal of all UNIFIL personnel located within 5 km of the Israeli-Lebanese border (meaning all the mission's positions in South Lebanon). Contributing countries to the mission unanimously declined.

On October 11, the IDF again attacked the base at Naqoura. Two Sri Lankan peacekeepers were wounded, one seriously, and the perimeter wall was damaged by an IDF bulldozer. In the evening, the governments of France, Italy and Spain released a joint statement condemning the attacks. The US government also called on Israel not to attack UNIFIL bases. The UN called the attack a "serious development". UNIFIL bases suffered heavy damage in clashes between the IDF and Hezbollah on the evening of 11 October. On 12 October, one Indonesian UNIFIL soldier was injured by Israeli fire.

On the same day, 12 October, Poland, together with a group of 43 other countries participating in the mission, condemned Israel's attacks on UNIFIL forces, calling for an immediate cessation of the attacks and ensuring adequate protection for UN personnel in accordance with international law. The countries that joined the Polish initiative condemning the attacks on UNIFIL are: Armenia, Austria, Bangladesh, Brazil, Cambodia, China, Cyprus, Croatia, El Salvador, Estonia, Fiji, Finland, France, Germany, Ghana, Greece, Guatemala, Hungary, India, Indonesia, Ireland, Italy, Kazakhstan, South Korea, Latvia, Malaysia, Malta, Moldova, Mongolia, Nepal, Netherlands, North Macedonia, Peru, Qatar, Serbia, Sierra Leone, Spain, Sri Lanka, Tanzania, Turkey, United Kingdom, Uruguay.

On 13 October, the mission reported that two IDF Merkava tanks had forced their way inside a UNIFIL position after destroying its gate. According to a confidential report prepared by the government of one of UNIFIL's contributing countries that was reviewed by the Financial Times, the Merkava tanks had remained in the base for 45 minutes after UNIFIL objections, but within an hour of their departure, multiple white phosphorus munitions were fired within 100 metres of the base, injuring 15 peacekeepers. Later that day, Israeli attacks on UNIFIL personnel and positions were condemned in a joint statement by 40 countries contributing to the peacekeeping mission. On 20 October, the IDF attacked a UNIFIL base in Marwahin, demolishing an observation tower and perimeter fence with an army bulldozer.

On October 21, 2024, a Croatian staff officer returned home because Croatia had not provided him with any military personnel for some time due to the high risk involved.

On 25 October, UNIFIL said in a statement that one of its observation towers near Dhayra had come under fire from Israeli troops on 22 October when they noticed the peacekeepers observing them "conducting house clearing operations nearby". The mission said that the peacekeepers on duty withdrew from the tower "to avoid being shot" On 26 October, UNIFIL spokesperson Andrea Tenenti said the mission's work was continuing, and "We are still present at all our locations, and we mean every one of these sites."

=== 2024 Israel–Lebanon ceasefire agreement ===
On 27 November 2024, a ceasefire agreement was signed by Israel, Lebanon, and five mediating countries, including the United States.

Between the 27 November 2024 ceasefire and the start of the March 2026 war, Israeli forces were documented committing more than 15,400 violations of Lebanese sovereignty. These incidents included near-daily airstrikes, ground incursions, and the maintenance of five unauthorised military positions inside Lebanon. Over 15,400 violations were documented by UNIFIL and the Lebanese government. Approximately 8,100, involving drones, fighter jets, and helicopters. More than 2,600, including troop movements and firing across the Blue Line. Israeli fire killed at least 370 people and injured over 1,100 during this period. More than 64,000 people remained internally displaced as of late 2025 due to ongoing insecurity in border regions.

UNIFIL documented the construction of an Israeli wall extending past the Blue Line, making 4,000 square metres of Lebanese land inaccessible.

UNIFIL reported numerous deliberate and incidental attacks by Israeli forces. These incidents included direct tank fire, drone-dropped grenades, and the destruction of surveillance equipment, resulting in injuries and significant hindrance to peacekeeping operations. On 2 September 2025, Israeli drones dropped four grenades near peacekeepers clearing roadblocks near the Blue Line. One grenade landed within 20 metres of UN personnel. A similar incident occurred on 26 October 2025, where a drone dropped a grenade near a patrol moments before a tank fired towards them. On 16 November 2025, an Israeli Merkava tank fired heavy machine gun rounds within five metres of peacekeepers on foot inside Lebanese territory. UNIFIL described this as a "serious violation" of Resolution 1701.

UNIFIL reported no new military infrastructure from non-state actors after the 2024 truce. They discovered over 360 illegal weapon caches and 300 pieces of unexploded ordnance, which were referred to the Lebanese Armed Forces (LAF) for disposal.

On 1 February 2026 patrols along the Blue Line were temporarily suspended after the Israeli military reported the use of a "non-toxic chemical substance". A week later, a spokesperson from the UN noted that they had received reports of the spraying of highly concentrated glyphosate herbicide and expressed concerns.

=== 2026 Lebanon war ===
Since 2 March 2026, there has been an ongoing war in Lebanon between Israel and Hezbollah. It is a resumption of major fighting in the Israel–Hezbollah conflict that began in late 2023, and is part of the wider conflict in the Middle East. The ongoing war has killed more than 1,500 militants and civilians in Lebanon and displaced nearly 1 million, 20% of the country's population, creating a humanitarian crisis.

The IDF issued a statement demanding the evacuation of the civilian population from the UNIFIL area of operations to the north of the Litani River on 4 March 2026. The order instructed residents of southern Lebanese villages and towns to move immediately ahead of a new wave of strikes against Hezbollah targets.

On 6 March 2026, two Israeli missile strikes hit a UNIFIL battalion headquarters in Al-Qaouzah, injuring three UN peacekeepers from Ghana. According to the Ghana Armed Forces, two soldiers sustained critical injuries, while a third was left traumatised. The most severely wounded peacekeeper was evacuated to a hospital in Beirut for surgery, while the others received care at a UNIFIL medical facility. The strikes destroyed the base's Officers' Mess facility, which was engulfed in flames following the impact. The Israel Defense Forces (IDF) later admitted to the strike, stating it was a mistake. An internal investigation concluded that the fire, intended for Hezbollah targets, was "mistakenly carried out" using 120mm tank shells. UNIFIL condemned the attack as "unacceptable", noting that targeting peacekeepers performing Security Council-mandated tasks could amount to a war crime. The Ghanaian government lodged a formal protest at the United Nations headquarters in New York, demanding a thorough investigation and accountability. Israel apologised to both Ghana and the United Nations for the error. French President Emmanuel Macron and Lebanese President Joseph Aoun both issued strong condemnations of the strike.

On 15 March 2026, peacekeepers from UNIFIL were fired upon in three separate incidents while conducting routine patrols near their bases in southern Lebanon. UNIFIL stated the gunfire was likely carried out by non-state armed groups. The fire in Yatar hit as close as five metres from the peacekeepers. The sources of fire in the two other incidents were about 100 and 200 metres away, respectively. Two patrols returned fire in self-defence, and after brief exchanges, the patrols resumed their planned activities. No peacekeeper was injured.

An Indonesian UNIFIL peacekeeper was killed on 29 March 2026 when a projectile exploded in a UNIFIL position near Adchit Al Qusayr. Another peacekeeper was critically injured. A UNIFIL investigation concluded that the projectile which killed the Indonesian peacekeeper was a 120mm shell fired from an Israeli Merkava tank.

The next day, on 30 March 2026, a UNIFIL logistics convoy was hit by an explosion near the town of Bani Hayyan. Two members of the Indonesian contingent were killed. A third peacekeeper was severely injured, and a fourth was also hurt. The explosion was caused by an Improvised Explosive Device (IED). Investigators concluded that, based on the location and context, the device was most likely planted by Hezbollah.

UNIFIL reported that the Israel Defense Forces systematically destroyed 17 surveillance cameras at its headquarters in Naqoura between 3 and 4 April 2026. UNIFIL spokesperson Kandice Ardiel stated that the equipment appeared to have been targeted by "some kind of laser" to disable the mission's monitoring capabilities. Cameras were also destroyed at five other UNIFIL positions on the Blue Line from Ras Naqoura to Maroun ar Ras by the IDF.

On the evening of 7 April 2026, the IDF briefly detained a Spanish UNIFIL peacekeeper after intercepting a logistics convoy. The peacekeeper was released in less than an hour following "direct and immediate contacts" from UNIFIL's Head of Mission, Force Commander, and Liaison Branch. UNIFIL stated the detention was a "blatant violation of international law" and a breach of UNSCR 1701, which mandates freedom of movement for peacekeepers. Spain summoned Israel's chargé d'affaires to protest the "unjustified detention" of their soldier, who was part of a contingent delivering supplies. The Spanish National Court (Audiencia Nacional) has opened preliminary investigation proceedings against Israeli Prime Minister Benjamin Netanyahu following the detention of the Spanish peacekeeper. The court is investigating potential war crimes, illegal detention, and coercion.

On 8 April 2026, the IDF fired warning shots at an Italian UNIFIL logistics convoy. The incident occurred approximately 2 km from the UNIFIL base in Shama while the convoy was travelling toward Beirut. There were no injuries reported among the Italian personnel, but at least one vehicle sustained minor damage from the shots. The convoy immediately halted and returned to its departure base in Shama. The incident sparked a significant diplomatic row between Italy and Israel. Italian Foreign Minister Antonio Tajani summoned the Israeli ambassador to Rome to demand an immediate explanation, stating that Italian soldiers "are not to be touched". Prime Minister Giorgia Meloni called the actions "irresponsible" and a clear violation of UN Resolution 1701. Defence Minister Guido Crosetto expressed "firm and indignant protest", calling the targeting of clearly identified UN vehicles.

On 11 April 2026, UNIFIL reported that Israeli soldiers spray-painted the windows of a pedestrian access gate at their headquarters in southern Lebanon, obstructing visibility.

On 12 April 2026, UNIFIL reported that IDF soldiers twice rammed their vehicles with a Merkava tank near Bayada, southern Lebanon. One of these incidents caused significant damage to the peacekeepers' equipment.

On 17 April 2026, a 10-day ceasefire between Israel and Lebanon officially came into effect. Despite the pause in major strikes, UNIFIL spokesperson Tilak Pokharel noted that artillery and mortar shelling continued in some areas of southern Lebanon in the early hours of the ceasefire. Israeli airspace violations also persist.

On the morning of 18 April 2026, a UNIFIL patrol was attacked while clearing explosive ordnance in the village of Al-Ghandouriyah. One French peacekeeper was killed, and three others were wounded, two of them seriously. The team was working to clear explosives to re-establish access to isolated UNIFIL positions. UNIFIL reported the patrol came under small-arms fire from non-state actors. President Emmanuel Macron stated that evidence suggests responsibility lies with Hezbollah.

=== UNIFIL mandate ending ===
Following the 2024 ceasefire related to Israeli attacks on Hezbollah militias in southern Lebanon, negotiations began on extending the UNIFIL mission. Ultimately, in August 2025 the UN Security Council voted to terminate the mission at the end of 2026, under pressure from Israel and the US. The mandate of the peacekeeping force in southern Lebanon is valid until December 31, 2026. After this date, in 2027, the process of withdrawing the UNIFIL peacekeeping force is to begin, handing over the protection of the Blue Line to the Lebanese Armed Forces, however due to cost-cutting measures in November 2025, the number of UN peacekeepers was reduced from 10,500 to over 9,900 compared to the beginning of the year. By February 2026, the number of UN peacekeepers had fallen to 7,500 and another reduction in UN forces is planned by May.

In December 2025, the Italian Minister of Defence Guido Crosetto declared that Italy would leave troops in southern Lebanon after the end of the UNIFIL mandate, as part of participation in MCT4L and MIBIL missions.

Finland has declared that it will remain in the UNIFIL mission until the mandate expires in December 2026.

Austrian and Irish peacekeepers are to remain in Lebanon under the existing UNIFIL mandate until 2027. The South Korea declared the withdrawal of its forces from the UNIFIL mission by the end of 2027. In turn, the Polish peacekeeping forces that are part of IRISHPOLBATT are to remain until 31 August 2026.

On 13 March 2026, the Croatian officer ended his service due to Croatia's withdrawal of military contingents from Iraq and Lebanon.

== Contributing countries ==
As of 4 November 2026, the total number of personnel in the mission is 7,485:

Country	Troops	Support Roles	Note(s)
Armenia	32		
Austria	160		
Bangladesh	119	The Bangladesh Navy deployed the Type 056 class corvette BNS Sangram, led by Captain Faisal Mohammad Arifur Rahman Bhuiyan, from September 2020. Previously, the frigate BNS Osman and large patrol craft (LPC) BNS Madhumati were deployed to the mission from 17 May 2010 to 14 June 2014. The frigate BNS Ali Haider and LPC BNS Nirmul were deployed from 14 June 2014 to 2018. The corvette BNS Bijoy was deployed from 1 January 2018 to August 2020. More than two thousand personnel of the Bangladesh Navy have completed the mission in Lebanon.	
Brazil	10	Former Maritime Task Force (MTF) commander (2011–2021), Brazilian Navy contributed with either a Niteroi-class frigate or Barroso-class corvette. Currently, Brazil has a small contingent	
Brunei Darussalam	21		
Cambodia	181		
China	472	200 engineers currently in Lebanon clearing mines and unexploded ordnance, medical team, peacekeeping troops	
Colombia	1	Staff officer	
Cyprus	2		
El Salvador	34		
Estonia	1		
Fiji	1	In the past 134	
Finland	144	Part of the French Force Commander Reserve, FCR	
France	608	The French Army contributed 13 Leclerc main battle tanks in Lebanon to UNIFIL ground forces until February 2007. France also continuously deploys part of their peace keeping operations rotations of French Paratroopers. In addition, French Navy ships with 1,700 sailors are deployed off Lebanon in Opération Baliste, and assisting in UNIFIL operations.	
Germany	198	Maritime Task Force (MTF) commander (2006–2008, 2021–present). Contributes naval ships to secure the Lebanese coast and prevent arms smuggling	
Ghana	625		
Greece	1	Elli-class frigate, HS Kanaris, to patrol against arms smugglers	
Guatemala	2	Officers	
Hungary	15	Topographers has part of Irishpolbatt.	
India	631	One Standard Infantry Battalion of the Indian Army (Regulars), along with support components from the Corps of Engineers (Sappers), Corps of Signals and other logistic Arms and Services	
Indonesia	757	850 men in a mechanized infantry battalion, 75 men in a military police unit, 200 men in a force protection company, 11 men assigned to UNIFIL's headquarters staff, and 111 men aboard KRI Diponegoro (Sigma-class corvette of the Indonesian Navy)	
Ireland	267	Irishpolbatt	
Italy	761	Assumed charge of UNIFIL ground forces in February 2007	
Kazakhstan	14		
Kenya	2		
Latvia	3		
Malawi	1	Staff officer	
Malaysia	515	Administrative (200) and patrol/quick reaction team (160; including commandos and special forces). Excluding the Brunei unit.	
Mongolia	4	Medical team	
Nepal	553	Infantry battalion	
Netherlands	1	Infantry battalion Dutchbatt: 839, of which 7 UNIFIL staff (1979–1983); Infantry battalion Dutchcoy: 155 (1983–1985); Maritime task force: 1 frigate + 718 military personnel (2006–2008). One staff officer.	
Nigeria	1		
North Macedonia	4		
Peru	1		
Poland	140	Since 2019 Polish military contingent consists of a maneuver company with KTO Rosomak APCs and HMMWV armored trucks and HQ staff officers. The Polish contingent is part of the Irish-Polish operational battalion Irishpolbatt.	
Serbia	169	8 staff officers, 5 national support element and 164 infantry	
Sierra Leone	3		
South Korea	163	Dongmyeong Unit which includes a MM battalion, an armored platoon with TM-170 armored personnel carriers, an engineering company, an observation section and an EOD unit intended for the elimination of explosive ordnance. Additionally, the Korean contingent has forces under direct command, including medical forces, military police and counter-terrorism forces.	
Spain	667	De-mining and beach cleaning, mechanized infantry battalion (1 infantry platoon from El Salvador), cavalry squadron, combat engineers, helicopter unit	
Sri Lanka	117	Mechanized infantry company with combat support personal and vehicles	
United Republic of Tanzania	77		
Turkey	2		
United Kingdom	2	Staff officers	
Uruguay	1		
Zambia	1		

=== Former contributors ===
Country	Last number troops	Final date withdrawn	Support Roles	Note(s)
Argentina	3	19 November 2024		
Belarus	5	9 February 2023	The Belarus Contingent consist of one surgical team and staff officer.	
Belgium	105	December 2014	De-miners, medical and reconstruction teams, 1 Karel Doorman-class frigate	
Bulgaria	160	15 December 2006	One Wielingen-class frigate called Drazki.	
Canada	117	1 October 1978		
Croatia	1	13 March 2026	The Croatian contingent of 49 soldiers ceased operations in 2007–2019. In 2019–2026 the mission was performed by one officer.	
Denmark	204	November 2011	2 patrol boats as force protection for German contingent and 144 logistic soldiers, and 10 firefighters from the Danish Emergency Management Agency	
Iran	600	January 1979	One reinforced company of the Iranian battalion from the United Nations Disengagement Observer Force which was released later and replaced by 600 troop battalion	
Malta	6	15 May 2026	Several professional soldiers in the form of officers and non-commissioned officers who are part of the IRISHPOLBATT	
Moldova	33	28 April 2026		
Norway	900	28 November 1998	Infantry battalion NORBATT, engineering unit NORMAINTCOY, rotary wing force NORAIR, medical unit NORMEDCOY, and naval ships to secure the Lebanese coast and prevent arms smuggling	
Portugal	140	27 June 2012	Engineering unit	
Qatar	1	October 2026	The only Arab nation to contribute to UNIFIL, deployed 205 soldiers to Lebanon in 2007. They mostly provided humanitarian assistance, and three logistics officers worked at UNIFIL headquarters	
Senegal	559	1 November 1984		
Slovakia	6	31 July 2007	Medical team	
Slovenia	37	8 August 2023		
Sweden	600	April 2007	One company from UNEF II 1978 to establish UNIFIL, one field hospital 1980–1992, one logistics battalion 1986–1994. 1 Göteborg-class corvette patrol in years 2006–2007	
Ukraine	127	August 2006	Engineer-Demining Battalion was performed by the unit 3rd Engineer Battalion	

== Assessment and controversy ==
Since its formation, UNIFIL has been repeatedly criticised and condemned as incompetent, ineffectual, "a failure" of the United Nations and "largely meaningless". The New Republic reported in October 2006 that,

Our military and W. intelligence sources reveal that Hizballah waited only one day after Israel's final pull-out to set up checkpoints and declare its retaken strongholds with rockets "closed military zones", which neither the Lebanese army nor UN peacekeepers have dared enter.

A former Israeli diplomat, Itamar Rabinovich, criticised the efficacy of UNIFIL, describing it as "a joke" and stating "They've been there for 26 years and since then, there have been so many skirmishes [along the border]." Former Israeli Prime Minister Ehud Olmert also said "We didn't like very much UNIFIL which was very useless and very helpless. Look what happened. Did you hear of any particular efforts of the United Nations UNIFIL force in the south of Lebanon to prevent the attacks against Israel in the first place. So they were not useful and that is why we were unhappy with them."

Both Israel and Hezbollah have accused UNIFIL of bias. Israel claims the force has allowed, if not aided, Hezbollah's replenishment of military power. Hezbollah, in turn, alleges that "certain contingents" of UNIFIL are spying for, if not assisting, Israel. During deadly skirmishes between Lebanese and Israeli forces in 2010, UNIFIL was heavily criticized for failing to intervene, with two Indonesian soldiers filmed fleeing the battleground in a taxi.

UNIFIL has responded to the accusations of bias levied by both sides. On 26 July 2006, a former spokesman stated that upon the mission's deployment in 1978, UNIFIL was "accused of being sympathetic to Palestinians", as Hezbollah had not yet been established. "A peacekeeping force does not come here with pre-set enemies. There is no enemy [inaudible] in a peacekeeping force. UNIFIL is a peacekeeping force. It's not an Israeli combat force or an anti-terror force, as they would like it to be. As long as we don't serve their direct interests, they are going to denigrate it as much as they can."

In February 2021, Lebanese journalist and opponent of Hezbollah Lokman Slim was abducted and murdered while in a UNIFIL-controlled area of Lebanon. According to the Los Angeles Review of Books,

Lokman Slim was found slumped over in the passenger seat of his Toyota with four bullets to the head and one to the back on February 4. Though his car was found outside Addoussieh in South Lebanon, his phone was retrieved from a field 36 kilometers away in Niha al-Janoub, a village he frequented once a week to have lunch with a friend, a general in the Lebanese Army. That he was kidnapped and murdered but kilometers from the UNIFIL barracks, where around 600 French and 200 Finnish soldiers were stationed, was a message to more than activists.

=== Israeli concerns ===
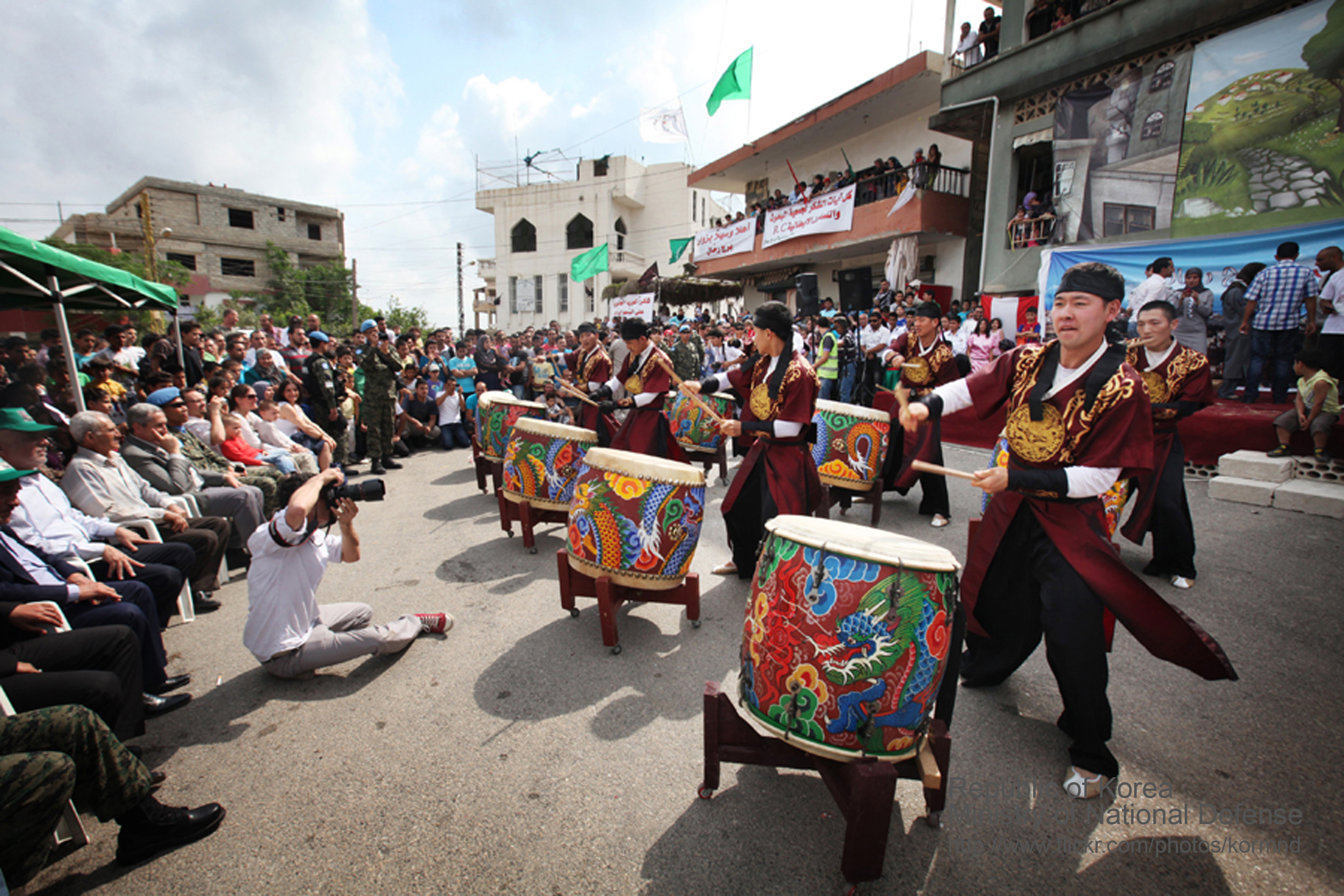
South Korean UNIFIL members performing for local Lebanese in 2012

Among Israel's criticisms of UNIFIL are that it maintains dialogue with Hezbollah, which it views as a terrorist organization, and treats Israeli and Hezbollah violations of UNSC Resolution 1701 equally, while Israel views its violations of Lebanese airspace as less severe than Hezbollah's violations including crossings of the blue line and rocket launches, namely because the presence of Hezbollah in southern Lebanon in and of itself is in violation of Resolution 1701. Israel and its primary allies in the west consider Hezbollah to be a terrorist organization and not a legitimate political party or representative of Lebanon. UNIFIL was accused of complicity in the fatal abduction of IDF soldiers in October 2000, and Israel further blamed it for obstructing its investigation by initially denying the existence of the attack and, upon the leaking of the incident's occurrence, refusing to supply videos for several months.

Prior to the July 2006 Lebanon War, Israel had been lobbying for UNIFIL to either take a more active role vis-a-vis Hezbollah—for example, preventing Hezbollah from stationing near UNIFIL posts to fire at the IDF and into northern Israel—or to step out of the region, which would thereby void the Lebanese government's excuse for not deploying Lebanese Armed Forces along the border.

UNIFIL also came under criticism during the 2006 Lebanon War for broadcasting detailed reports of Israeli troop movements, numbers, and positions on their website which "could have exposed Israeli soldiers to grave danger", while making no such reports about Hezbollah. UNIFIL's actions could have been motivated by the fact that Israel was, as a response to Hezbollah rocket fire (which Hezbollah alleges to have been a reaction to Israeli "border violations") and to the kidnapping of Israeli soldiers, conducting a ground invasion of Lebanon at that time. Israel was concerned when it was reported that Indonesia was being considered to replace Italy as commander of UNIFIL's naval force. As Indonesia does not recognize Israel, and the two countries have no diplomatic or military relations, Israel expressed concern that cooperation with the IDF, especially the Israeli Navy, could deteriorate.

A 2010 book published by Norwegian journalist Odd Karsten Tveit revealed that the Norwegian Army was complicit in the escape of two Lebanese men who were arrested by the Israeli Army and being held in Khiam prison. According to the book, in 1992, two detained Lebanese men escaped from Khiam prison. Fearing that they would face torture or execution if caught by the Israel Defense Forces or South Lebanon Army, the soldiers dressed the detainees in UN uniforms, and placed them in a UNIFIL convoy which left Southern Lebanon through Israeli roadblocks. Shortly afterward, Israeli Army commander Moshe Tamir visited the Norwegian battalion's camp, and accused Norwegian commander Hagrup Haukland of "sheltering terrorists". Immediately after the confrontation, the Lebanese men were smuggled onto a bus used by Norwegian peacekeepers on leave, which took them to Beirut.

=== Hezbollah concerns ===
Hezbollah supporters have accused UNIFIL of siding with Israel, especially since the passage of Resolution 1701 which they view as one-sided. On 16 October 2006, Lebanon's top Shiite cleric Grand Ayatollah Sayyed Mohammad Hussein Fadlallah declared that the UN force had "come to protect Israel, not Lebanon", echoing the sentiment of the leader of Hezbollah – Sayed Hassan Nasrallah, who previously said "They are ashamed of us, brothers and sisters. They are ashamed of saying they came to defend us, but they talk about defending Israel."

=== Southern Lebanese reception ===
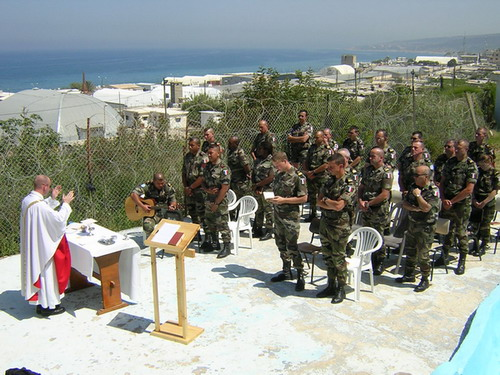
A 2004 Easter mass in South Lebanon by the French UNIFIL contingent

In the summer of 2010, relations soured between the French contingent and residents in several villages that led to injuries on both sides, after a French regiment began an exercise to identify Hezbollah members that included searching homes, taking photographs, using sniffer dogs, and questioning residents. Residents accused them of violating private property, treating them with contempt, and of not coordinating with the Lebanese army. The residents made clear that their conflict was only with the French contingent, and that relations with other contingents were good. Following discussions between UNIFIL commanders, ambassadors of countries with soldiers in UNIFIL, and the commander of the Lebanese army, an agreement was reached under which sniffer dogs would no longer be used, UNIFIL soldiers would refrain from entering Lebanese homes and yards, and only Lebanese army soldiers would carry out searches of homes.

Generally, relations between UNIFIL and local residents have been good. UNIFIL forces have offered various services to the locals, and have introduced elements of their own culture. India's UNIFIL contingent has carried out small-scale development projects, operates medical and dental clinics, veterinary care for local animals, and also runs entertainment camps for children and yoga classes.

The Indonesian UNIFIL contingent (INDOBATT) also gained a good reputation among the South Lebanese people through the Civil Military Coordination (CIMIC) program implemented by the contingent. This program has included many community-based activities, including computer courses for local residents, medical assistance and also technical assistance in rebuilding social facilities.

The French contingent has taught poetry courses to local Francophone residents as well as French vocabulary and grammar to primary school students in 15 schools, the Italian contingent has given cooking lessons, the South Korean contingent has taught Taekwondo, and the Chinese contingent has taught Tai chi.

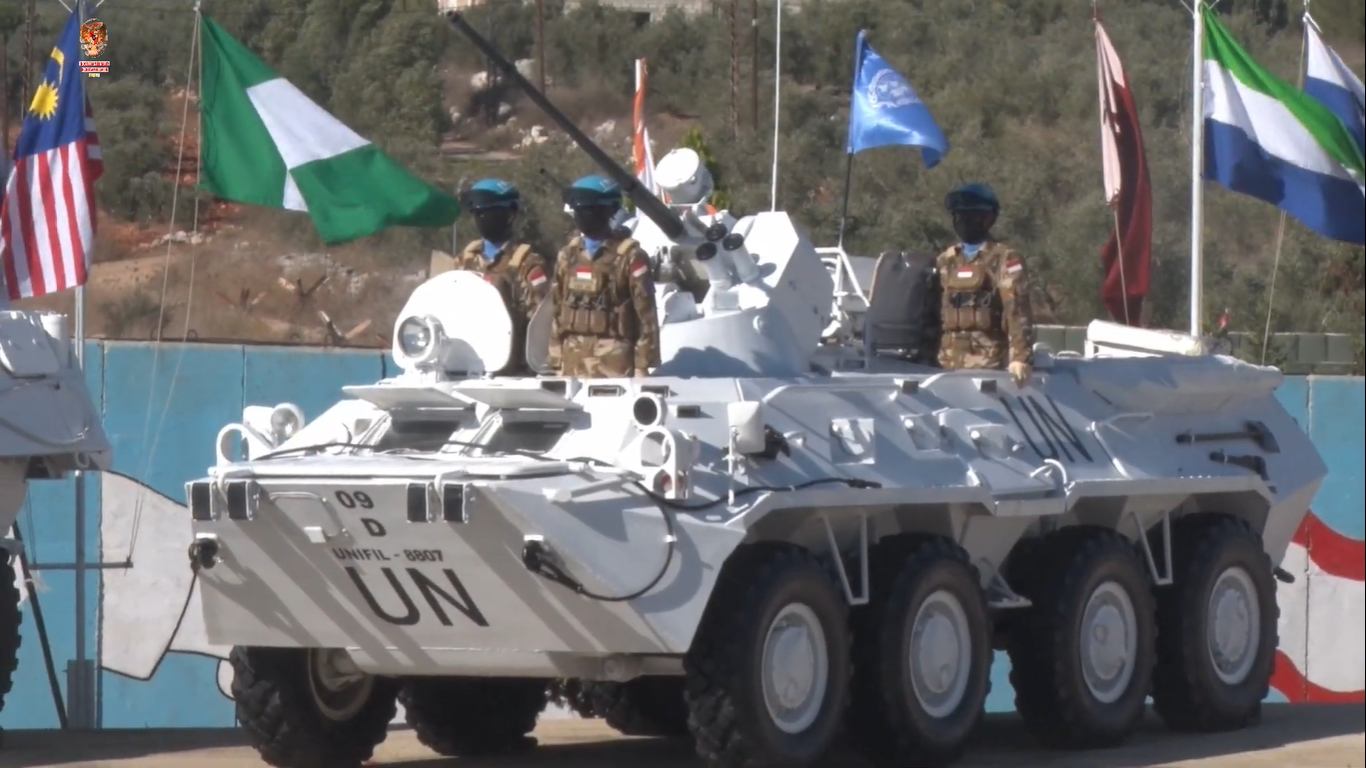
Korps Marinir BTR-80A of the Indonesian Contingent of UNIFIL during Medal Parade Ceremony at Indobatt Compound in Aadchit Al Qusayr, Southern Lebanon, 2020

An official source within the Lebanese government informed Al Jazeera that, despite UNIFIL's shortcomings, the force had been responsible for regularly hosting and mediating negotiations between Lebanese and Israeli forces, helping to defuse tensions. The source also claimed that prior to the mission's deployment in 1978, southern Lebanon was far more chaotic and unstable, and that UNIFIL's departure would lead to an outbreak of more conflict.

== Confrontations ==
=== Israel ===
On 22 September 2006, French Air Force jets were seen over the skies of Beirut during Hassan Nasrallah's victory speech, possibly trying to protect him from an Israeli assassination attempt. Nasrallah told the crowd that he had no fear in addressing the masses directly, rather than through armored glass. On 28 September, two Israeli Merkava tanks, an armored bulldozer, and a number of military vehicles entered Lebanon and established a road block 500 meters away from the road leading to Marwahin village.

The IDF force asked to advance deeper into Lebanese territory but they were confronted by four United Nations Leclerc tanks operated by French troops, which blocked their advance. The confrontation lasted for half an hour, in which Israeli soldiers confiscated the identity cards of photographers at the scene, claiming they may give pictures of the Israeli military to Hezbollah members. According to American and German correspondents, the French retreated, while the French commander claimed that the Israelis had turned back.

Following the war, Hezbollah was widely reported to be rearming with the help of Iran and Syria, which were reportedly smuggling weaponry and munitions into Lebanon to replenish Hezbollah's depleted stocks. Israel accused UNIFIL of failing to prevent Hezbollah's rearmament and thus failing to implement Resolution 1701. The Israeli Air Force began flying reconnaissance sorties over Lebanon to monitor Hezbollah's rearmament, with Israel announcing they would continue until Resolution 1701 was fully implemented. This led to repeated confrontations with UNIFIL.

On 3 October 2006, an Israeli fighter jet penetrated the 2-nautical-mile (3.7 km) defense perimeter of the French Navy frigate Courbet without answering radio calls, triggering a diplomatic incident. Israel apologized after official protests from the French government.

On 24 October, six Israeli Air Force F-16 jets flew over the German Navy intelligence ship Alster, patrolling off Israel's coast just south of the Lebanese border. The German Defense Ministry said that the planes had given off infrared decoys and one of the aircraft had fired two shots into the air, which had not been specifically aimed. The Israeli military said that a German helicopter took off from the vessel without having coordinated this with Israel, and denied vehemently having fired any shots at the vessel and said "as of now" it also had no knowledge of the jets launching flares over it.

Israeli Defense Minister Amir Peretz telephoned his German counterpart Franz Josef Jung to clarify that "Israel has no intention to carry out any aggressive actions" against the German peacekeeping forces in Lebanon, who are there as part of UNIFIL to enforce an arms embargo against Hezbollah. Germany confirmed the consultations, and that both sides were interested in maintaining good cooperation. The Alster's crew had recorded several overflights by Israeli jets in the previous weeks, but claimed that the Israeli aircraft had always stayed at high altitude. The week before the incident, Israeli jets had confronted a German naval helicopter, but turned back after the Germans identified themselves.

Shortly after the war, UN Secretary-General Kofi Annan, reporting to the Security Council, stated that there were no serious incidents or confrontations, but that peacekeepers reported Israeli flyovers "almost on a daily basis". UNIFIL commander Alain Pellegrini claimed that Israeli flyovers violated the cease-fire and Lebanese sovereignty, and warned that if the diplomatic efforts to stop the overflights failed, force might be used to stop them. Israeli military sources reported that Israel would bomb UNIFIL positions if Israeli aircraft were attacked. On 23 October, sources in the Israeli defense establishment said that intelligence gathered by the sorties had revealed that Hezbollah was rebuilding its military infrastructure. Israeli Defense Minister Amir Peretz told the cabinet that surveillance flights over Lebanon would continue in light of the fact that arms smuggling between Syria and Lebanon continued.

On 31 October 2006, eight Israeli F-15s flew over many areas of Lebanon, including Beirut. The jets also flew over a French position in Lebanon. According to the French Defense Minister Michele Alliot-Marie, the planes came in at what was interpreted as an attack formation, and the peacekeepers were "two seconds away" from firing at the jets with an anti-aircraft missile.

On 6 September, during a European Union meeting in Brussels, the French Defense Minister announced that the Israeli Air Force had stopped mock air attacks over UNIFIL positions. On 17 November, two Israeli F-15s overflew UN positions at low altitude and high speed while two reconnaissance planes circled the headquarters of the French battalion. French peacekeepers responded by readying their anti-aircraft batteries, and warned that Israeli warplanes conducting mock attacks could be fired on.

The IAF continued its reconnaissance flights over Lebanon, and despite strong protests, UNIFIL peacekeeping forces did not follow through on their threats to fire at Israeli aircraft. The Lebanese government reported hundreds of overflights by Israeli aircraft, and also claimed that Israeli troops had illegally crossed the border dozens of times, including into the disputed Shebaa farms area.

On 11 October 2024, IDF fired on UNIFIL positions in southern Lebanon, injuring two peacekeepers after striking a watchtower at UNIFIL's headquarters in Ras an-Naqoura. UNIFIL labeled the attacks as deliberate violations of international humanitarian law. Various international actors, including the US, EU, UK, Italy, France, Spain and Ireland, condemned the attack, calling for accountability and the protection of peacekeepers.

In late 2025, UNIFIL had to increase their number of complaints against the IDF.

=== Militias ===
A battle took place on May 9, 1978, in the town of Kaukaba when PLO soldiers attacked Norwegian peacekeepers. The battle took place about six weeks after the first Norwegian troops arrived in Lebanon. The skirmish is regarded as one of the hardest battles fought by Norwegian soldiers in the UNIFIL force, and the PLO soldiers got as close as 30 meters. Throughout the skirmish, the Norwegians fired about 200 machine gun shots, 50 shots from automatic weapons and two Carl Gustav RFK grenades. The PLO fired about ten times more shots from hand weapons, as well as eight gun grenades. Eventually the PLO gave up, and pledged not to fire at the Norwegians again. One Norwegian suffered light injuries during the attack. Official PLO casualties were one dead and one wounded. The Norwegian soldiers believed the real number of Palestinians dead to be closer to eight.

On 6 April 1980, clashes between UNIFIL peacekeepers and the South Lebanon Army, an Israeli-backed Lebanese militia, began when the SLA attacked Irish troops based in At Tiri. The Irish soldiers held their ground and called in Dutch and Fijian peacekeepers as reinforcements. The battle ended on 12 April when the Dutch contingent employed TOW missiles against the SLA. During the battle, two UNIFIL peacekeepers were killed: Stephen Griffin, a 21-year-old Private from the 46th Irish Battalion, from Rahoon in County Galway, and Sevati Sovonaivalu of the Fijian Army. One SLA soldier, 19-year old Massoud Bazzi, was also killed.

On 18 April 1980, two Irish soldiers were killed in the area. In December 2020, a Lebanese military court found ex-militia member Mahmoud Bazzi, brother of Massoud, guilty of the murders of Private Thomas Barrett and Private Derek Smallhorne in April 1980. The court sentenced Bazzi to life in prison. It immediately reduced this sentence to 15 years on the basis of him being aged 76 at the time of conviction.

On 24 June 2007, six UNIFIL soldiers, three Colombians and three Spanish, were killed after their vehicle was hit by an explosive device. Two others, both Spanish, were injured in the incident. No group has yet admitted responsibility, although the Israeli military believed the attack was perpetrated by members of al-Qaeda.

== Casualties ==
=== Fatalities ===
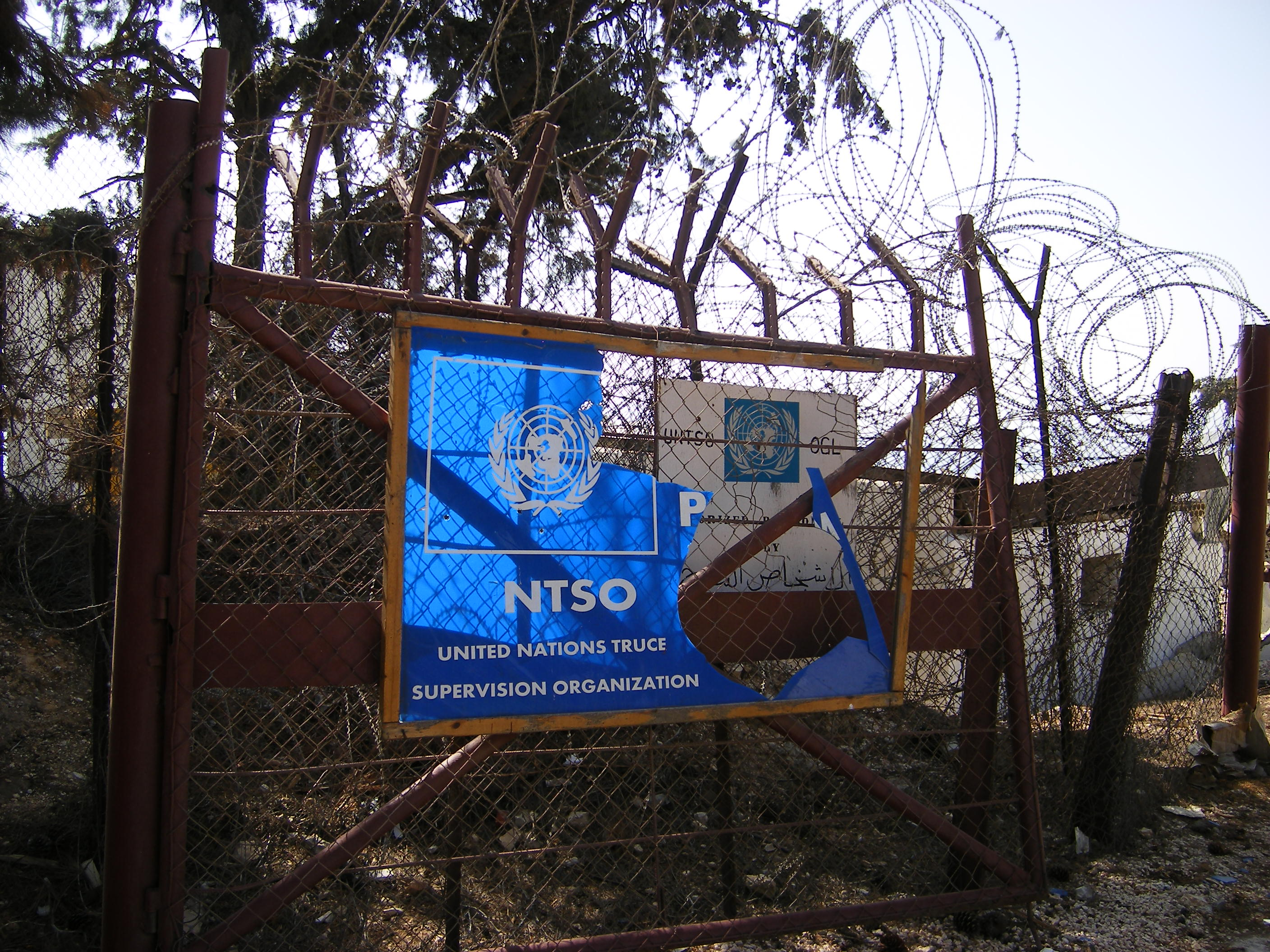
The entrance to the UN base where four UN peacekeepers were killed during the 2006 conflict

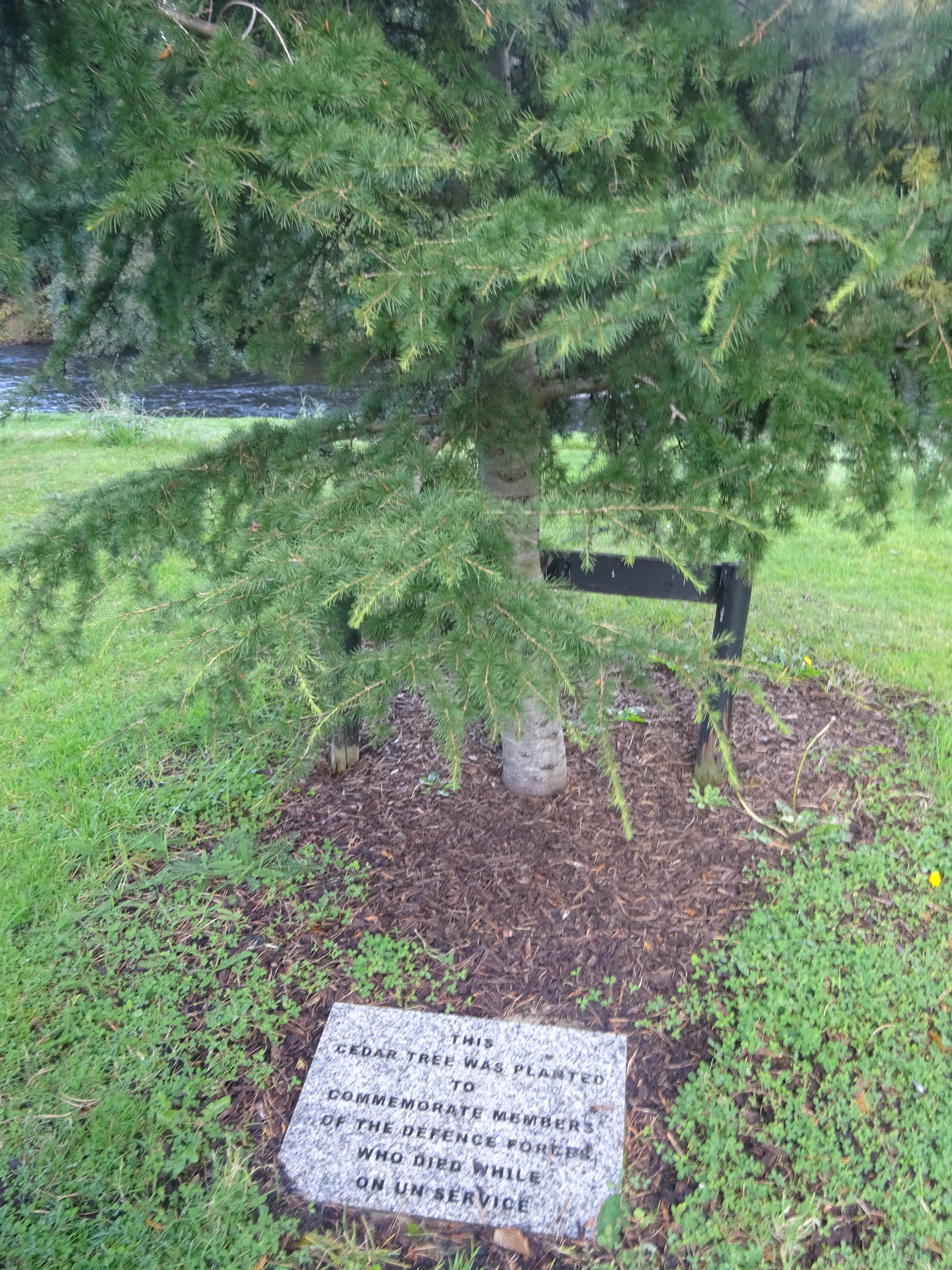
Lebanon cedar planted in Newbridge, County Kildare, Ireland to commemorate Irish soldiers who died on UN service.

As of 26 April 2026, UNIFIL has had 348 fatalities since 1978. They include the following nationalities:

Country	Death Total
Bangladesh	1
Belgium	4
Canada	1
China	1
Denmark	1
El Salvador	1
Fiji	36
Finland	11
France	42
Ghana	39
India	6
Indonesia	7
Iran	1
Ireland	48
Italy	7
Lebanon	11
Malaysia	4
Nepal	31
Netherlands	9
Nigeria	10
Norway	21
Philippines	1
Poland	8
Senegal	16
Serbia	1
Spain	16
Sri Lanka	1
Sweden	7
Turkey	1
United Kingdom	4

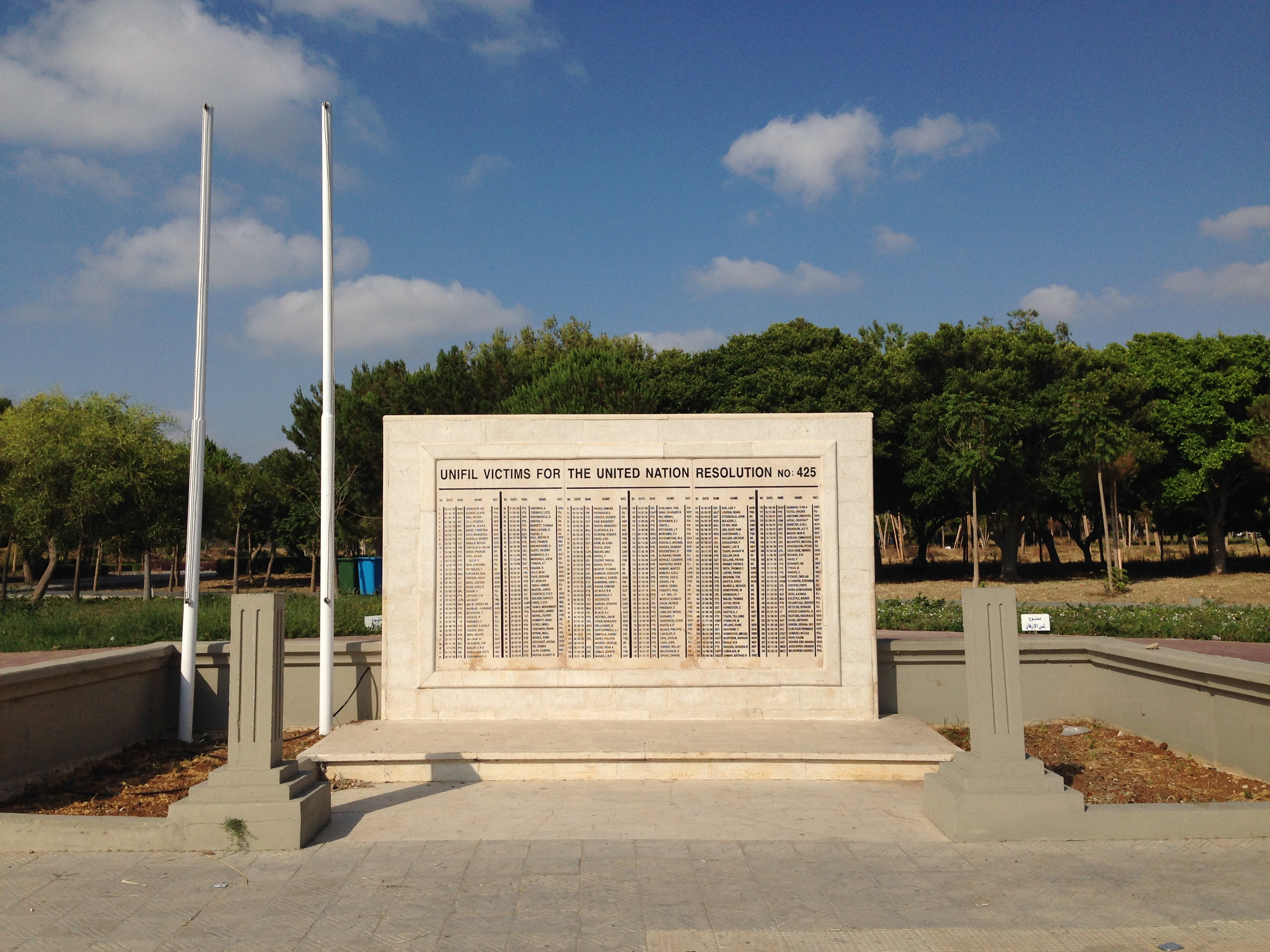
Unfinished memorial for UNIFIL casualties in Tyre, 2019

Incidents

Date	Incident
29 March 1978	A Swedish soldier, Karl-Oscar Johansson was killed and another, Marc Lindoberg, was injured when their vehicle hit a landmine in the vicinity of the Khardala Bridge. Johansson was UNIFIL's first fatality.
1979	Three Fijian soldiers shot in ambush by PFLP.
16 March 1981	Three Nigerian soldiers killed in bombardment by SLA artillery.
25 June 1981	Two Fijian soldiers were killed and one wounded by PLO gunmen. They had been among the nine Fijian soldiers captured by the PFLP in an ambush. Three of them where tortured and 'executed' one by one by being shot in the head. One survived.
27 October 1982	An Irish soldier, Private Michael McAleavey, opened fire and killed three other Irish soldiers. He originally claimed Lebanese gunmen had killed them, but later admitted the killings, saying he had "snapped" due to dehydration and heat exhaustion. He received a life sentence at court martial, being paroled in 2009.
22 August 1986	An Irish soldier was killed and two others wounded by a roadside bomb. Two heavily armed men with bomb-making equipment were subsequently caught by a UNIFIL patrol and handed over to Lebanese police.
28 September 1986	Three French soldiers were killed by a roadside bomb while jogging. UN officials attributed the attack to Shiite fundamentalists, particularly Hezbollah.
20 November 1986	Three Fijian soldiers and three Lebanese were killed in a suicide car bombing, and three UNIFIL soldiers, two Lebanese civilians, and an SLA soldier were injured. The car, with two occupants inside, had run through a UNIFIL roadblock, apparently aiming for the Israeli border, but after being fired at as it approached an SLA roadblock, it returned to the UNIFIL roadblock, and exploded as Fijian and SLA soldiers approached.
11 January 1987	An Irish soldier, Corporal Dermot McLoughlin, was killed when an Israeli tank shelled an Irish UNIFIL position. The Israelis had opened fire after spotting a large squad of guerrillas near the position. Two senior Israeli officers were later disciplined over the incident.
24 February 1989	An Irish soldier was shot dead by SLA in Haddatha.
21 March 1989	Three Irish soldiers were killed by a landmine on the road to their outpost near Baraachit. Officers on the ground are reported as believing that the SLA were responsible and that UNIFIL were being deliberately targeted.
19 February 1990	Two Nepali soldiers were killed and six injured by SLA mortar fire that hit their compound. The SLA and IDF claimed that the fire had come in response to Hezbollah RPG and mortar fire.
3 September 1991	A Swedish soldier, Kenneth Fransson was killed when he was caught in the middle of a shootout between Palestinians and SLA soldiers in Naqoura.
15 September 1991	A Swedish soldier was killed and five Swedish and French soldiers were wounded when Palestinian gunmen intending to carry out an attack on the Israeli city of Nahariya en route to their target by boat mistakenly landed in Naqoura and confronted UNIFIL troops. One of the gunmen was also killed, another injured, and four captured. In a separate incident, two gunmen ambushed a Nepali UNIFIL patrol near Yater, just north of the security zone, killing one soldier and wounding another. One of the gunmen was killed by return fire while the other escaped.
23 February 1993	A Nepali soldier was killed and another seriously wounded after being caught in an exchange of fire between Hezbollah and the SLA in the vicinity of their post. The UN claimed that they had been killed by SLA shelling, while a senior IDF officer said it was uncertain who was at fault.
27 December 1993	A Norwegian soldier, Private Gorm Bjørnar Hagen, was killed and another, Lieutenant Øyvind Berg, was wounded when an Israeli tank patrol engaged in a nighttime search for guerrillas mistook a Norwegian UNIFIL unit for enemy fighters and fired three tank shells at them. The Israeli unit subsequently assisted the Norwegian unit and called in a helicopter to airlift the injured soldier to an Israeli hospital.
20 March 1995	A Nepali soldier was killed and three others wounded by Israeli shelling near Yater.
18 April 1996	4 Fijian soldiers were wounded when the headquarters compound of the Fijian battalion of the United Nations Interim Force in Lebanon in the village of Qana came under fire by Israeli artillery, at the time where more than 800 Lebanese had sought refuge inside the compound in which an estimated 100 persons were killed and a larger number wounded. This incident is known as Qana massacre.
31 May 1999	An Irish soldier, Pte. William Kedian was killed in an exchange of fire between Hezbollah and the SLA.
9 January 2005	A French officer was killed and a Swedish officer and a Lebanese civilian were wounded by Israeli shelling that was in retaliation to a Hezbollah attack that killed an Israeli soldier. A Hezbollah fighter was also killed.
25 July 2006	Four UN observers, one each from Canada, Finland, Austria, and China, were killed in an Israeli airstrike that hit their position in Khiam during the 2006 Lebanon War.
25 September 2006	A French engineer officer was killed in a road accident near the town of Sofar.
9 March 2007	Three Belgian soldiers were killed in an armoured vehicle accident.
24 June 2007	Three Colombian and three Spanish soldiers were killed in a bomb blast between Marjayoun and Khiam.
25 July 2007	A French soldier was killed near the village of Chamaa while clearing unexploded munitions.
11 October 2007	A British man, Craig Appleby (36) was killed while clearing munitions near Bint Jbeil.
12 November 2007	Two French soldiers were wounded as a result of the accidental discharge of a weapon. One of the wounded men subsequently died while being evacuated to Hospital.
15 June 2008	A Spanish soldier was killed and two injured in a road accident.
3 September 2008	A Belgian soldier was killed near the village of Aitaroun while clearing munitions left over from the 2006 conflict.
27 May 2011	Six Italian soldiers were wounded when their VM-90 military truck was destroyed by a roadside bomb near Sidon.
4 August 2020	The Bangladesh Navy corvette BNS Bijoy was anchored in the Port of Beirut during the 2020 Beirut explosion. The ship received moderate damage and 21 crew members were injured in the blast.
14 December 2022	An Irish soldier, Pte. Seán Rooney (23) was killed, and three wounded when their convoy of two armoured vehicles was surrounded by a mob and fired on while en route to Beirut.
15 October 2023	UNIFIL mentioned that its headquarters in Naqoura, was hit by a rocket during the 2023 Israel–Lebanon border clashes with no injuries reported.
28 October 2023	UNIFIL reported that a shell landed in its headquarters, the second such incident since the border clashes began. Later that day, a UNIFIL peacekeeper was injured after two mortar shells hit their base near Houla.
30 March 2024:	UNIFIL reported three observers from the UN Truce Supervision Organization and a Lebanese translator were wounded when a shell exploded near them while they were patrolling the southern Lebanese border with Israel. Israel denied reports that it was responsible for the attack.
2 September 2024	Two people, including an independent contractor working for UNIFIL, were killed during an Israeli airstrike against a vehicle on the Tyre-Naqoura road in Lebanon.
15 November 2024	One French soldier were killed and three people were injured in road incident near the village of Shama
28 June 2025	One Turkish air infantry colonel died of a heart attack.
29 March 2026	An Indonesian soldier was killed by a 120mm shell fired from an Israeli Merkava tank. The second Indonesian soldier, a 31-year-old corporal Rico Pramudia, died of his wounds on April 24.
30 March 2026	Two Indonesian soldiers were killed by an explosion caused by an IED most likely planted by Hezbollah.
18 April 2026	French soldier staff sergeant Florian Montorio killed in shooting ambush.
22 April 2026	French chief corporal Anicet Girardin died after returning to France from wounds sustained in an ambush.
4 June 2026	Serbian soldier Sergeant Milovan Jovanovic died after sustaining injuries during a shelling near Marjayoun. Two other peacekeepers from El Salvador and Spain were also injured at the scene.

=== Injuries ===
==== Compensation for tortious injury ====
A verdict of Trondheim District Court in 2006 resulted in the Norwegian government being ordered to pay 1.216 million kroner as compensation for tortious injury that Knut Braa acquired as a UNIFIL soldier.

== Leadership ==
=== Commanders of the force ===
Start date	End date	Name	Country
March 1978	February 1981	Emmanuel A. Erskine	Ghana
February 1981	May 1986	William O'Callaghan	Ireland
June 1986	June 1988	Gustav Hägglund	Finland
July 1988	February 1993	Lars-Eric Wahlgren	Sweden
February 1993	February 1995	Trond Furuhovde	Norway
April 1995	1 October 1997	Stanisław Woźniak	Poland
February 1997	September 1999	Jioje Konousi Koronte	Fiji
30 September 1999	1 December 1999	James Sreenan	Ireland
16 November 1999	15 May 2001	Seth Kofi Obeng	Ghana
15 May 2001	17 August 2001	Ganesan Athmanathan	India
17 August 2001	17 February 2004	Lalit Mohan Tewari	India
17 February 2004	2 February 2007	Alain Pellegrini	France
2 February 2007	28 January 2010	Claudio Graziano	Italy
28 January 2010	28 January 2012	Alberto Asarta Cuevas	Spain
28 January 2012	24 July 2014	Paolo Serra	Italy
24 July 2014	24 July 2016	Luciano Portolano	Italy
24 July 2016	7 August 2018	Michael Beary	Ireland
7 August 2018	28 February 2022	Stefano Del Col	Italy
28 February 2022	24 June 2025	Aroldo Lázaro Sáenz	Spain
24 June 2025	Present	Diodato Abagnara	Italy

=== Deputy Commanders of the Force ===
Start date	End date	Name	Country
2 December 2022	Present	Maj Gen Chok Bahadur Dhakal	Nepal

=== Commanders of the Maritime Task Force ===
Start date	End date	Name	Country
September 2006	16 October 2006	Giuseppe De Giorgi	Italy
16 October 2006	March 2007	Andreas Krause	Germany
March 2007	September 2007	Karl-Wilhelm Bollow	Germany
September 2007	February 2008	Christian Luther	Germany
February 2008	August 2008	Ruggiero di Biase	Italy
September 2008	February 2009	Jean-Louis Kerignard	France
March 2009	May 2009	Jean-Thierry Pynoo	Belgium
August 2009	August 2009	Ruggiero Di Biase	Italy
September 2009	November 2009	Jürgen Mannhardt	Germany
December 2009	February 2011	Paolo Sandalli	Italy
February 2011	February 2012	Luiz Henrique Caroli	Brazil
February 2012	February 2013	Wagner Lopes de Moraes Zamith	Brazil
February 2013	February 2014	Joese de Andrade Bandeira Leandro	Brazil
February 2014	February 2015	Walter Eduardo Bombarda	Brazil
February 2015	February 2016	Flavio Macedo Brasil	Brazil
February 2016	February 2017	Claudio Henrique Mello de Almeida	Brazil
February 2017	February 2018	Sergio Fernando de Amaral Chaves Junior	Brazil
February 2018	February 2019	Eduardo Machado Vazquez	Brazil
February 2019	February 2020	Eduardo Augusto Wieland	Brazil
February 2020	December 2020	Sergio Renato Berna Salgueirinho	Brazil
December 2020	Present	Axel Schulz	Germany

=== Personal representatives of the Secretary-General for Southern Lebanon ===
Start date	End date	Name	Country
March 1978	?	Jean Cuq	France
2000	15 January 2001	Rolf Göran Knutsson	Sweden
15 January 2001	April 2005	Staffan de Mistura	Italy
April 2005	2007	Geir Pedersen	Norway

== See also ==
- List of extrajudicial killings and political violence in Lebanon
- 1978 South Lebanon conflict
- 1982 Lebanon War
- 1996 shelling of Qana
- 2006 Lebanon War
- 2010 Israel–Lebanon border clash
- Attacks on United Nations personnel during the 2006 Lebanon War
- January 2015 Shebaa farms incident
- Lebanese Civil War
- Multinational Force in Lebanon
- South Lebanon Army
- Apurba Kumar Bardalai
- Killing of Private Seán Rooney
