= Du Zhaoyu =

United Nations Truce Supervision Organization peacekeeper (1972–2006)

- Native name: 杜照宇
- Born: November 1972 Huantai County, Shandong, China
- Died: 25 July 2006 (aged 33) Khiam, Lebanon
- Allegiance: China
- Branch: People's Liberation Army; United Nations Truce Supervision Organization; United Nations Interim Force in Lebanon
- Rank: Lieutenant colonel
- Conflicts: 2006 Lebanon War †

Du Zhaoyu (November 1972 — 25 July 2006) was a lieutenant colonel in the Chinese People's Liberation Army who served as member of the United Nations Truce Supervision Organization and the United Nations Interim Force in Lebanon. He was killed by an Israeli bombing of the United Nations peacekeeping force in southern Lebanon on 25 July 2006, during the 2006 Lebanon War.

== Early life ==
Born in 1972 in Huantai County in Zibo, Shandong, with ancestral home in Jing County, Hebei, Du attended primary school in Jinan. After graduating from primary school in 1984, he continued with his studies at Jinan No. 7 Middle School. He graduated from high school there in July 1990.

== Military career ==
Upon graduation from high school in 1990, Du was admitted to the International Relations College of the People's Liberation Army and in 1993, he became a member of the Chinese Communist Party (CCP). In 1994 after graduating with undergraduate degree in 1994, he studied for a master's degree at the School of International Relations of the People's Liberation Army. In July 1997, he graduated with a master's degree from the school and served as staff officer of the Ministry of National Defense of China, and secretary to the military attaché at the Chinese Embassy in India.

In December 2005, he was sent to the United Nations Truce Supervision Organization in the Middle East to perform peacekeeping tasks and was assigned as a United Nations military observer in Lebanon. In an eight-month term, Du Zhaoyu, together with other observers at the post, carried out more than 150 patrol missions, travelled more than 16,000 kilometers in total, submitted more than 200 observation reports, and presided over the investigation and handling of border incidents.

=== Death ===
On the evening of 25 July 2006, local time (during the 2006 Israel-Lebanon War), Israel bombed an observation post of the United Nations peacekeeping force in the village of Khiam in southern Lebanon. Du Zhaoyu and three other United Nations observers died. Chairman of the Central Military Commission Hu Jintao, Minister of National Defense Cao Gangchuan and Commander of the PLA Ground Force Liang Guanglie offered condolences to Du's family.

Du's body arrived in China on 2 August. His memorial service at Babaoshan Revolutionary Cemetery was attended by Hu Jintao and other top military and civilian officials. On 29 August 2006, he was posthumously awarded the First class of the Meritorious Service Medal and on 30 May 2007, he was posthumously awarded the Dag Hammarskjöld Medal.

A memorial honoring Du and three other UN observers who were killed on 25 July 2006 is located at the village of Khiam. On 2021, more than 50 people including UNIFL personnel and Chinese Embassy in Lebanon staff paid tribute to Du at the memorial.

== See also ==
- International incidents during the 2006 Lebanon War
