= United Nations Security Council Resolution 43 =

United Nations Security Council resolution

UN Security Council Resolution 43
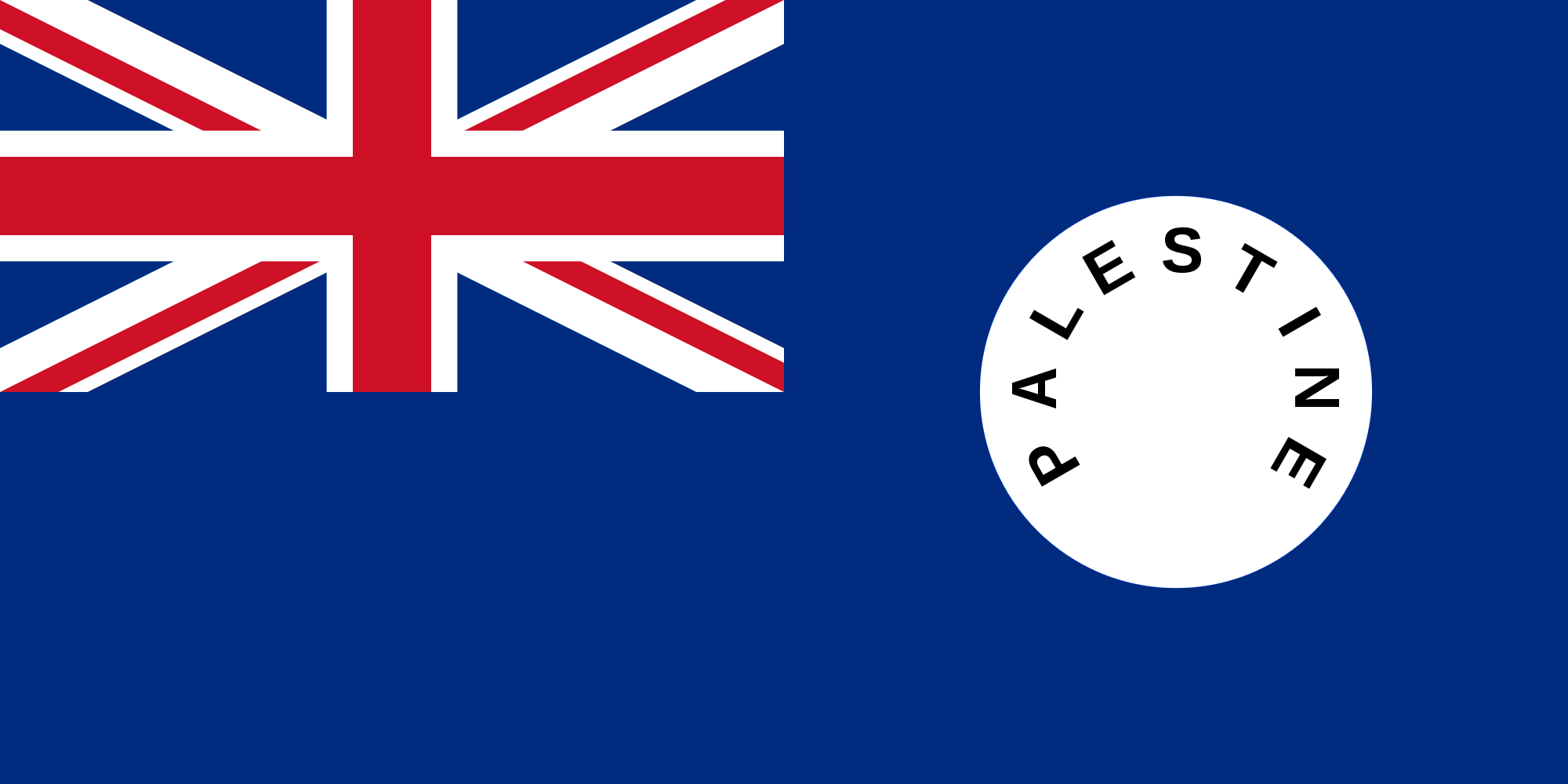
- Palestine flag
- Date: April 1 1948
- Meeting no.: 277
- Code: S/714, I (Document)
- Subject: The Palestine question
- Voting summary: 11 voted for; None voted against; None abstained
- Result: Adopted

Security Council composition
- Permanent members: China; France; Soviet Union; United Kingdom; United States
- Non-permanent members: Argentina; Belgium; Canada; Colombia; Syria; Ukrainian SSR

United Nations Security Council Resolution 43 was adopted unanimously on 1 April 1948. The Council, noting the violence and disorder in Palestine, called upon the Jewish Agency for Palestine and the Arab Higher Committee to arrange and enforce a truce. The Council called upon armed groups in Palestine to cease acts of violence.

== See also ==
- Arab–Israeli conflict
- List of United Nations Security Council Resolutions 1 to 100 (1946–1953)
- United Nations Security Council Resolution 46
- United Nations Security Council Resolution 48
- United Nations Security Council Resolution 49
- United Nations Security Council Resolution 50
