= International incidents during the 2006 Lebanon War =

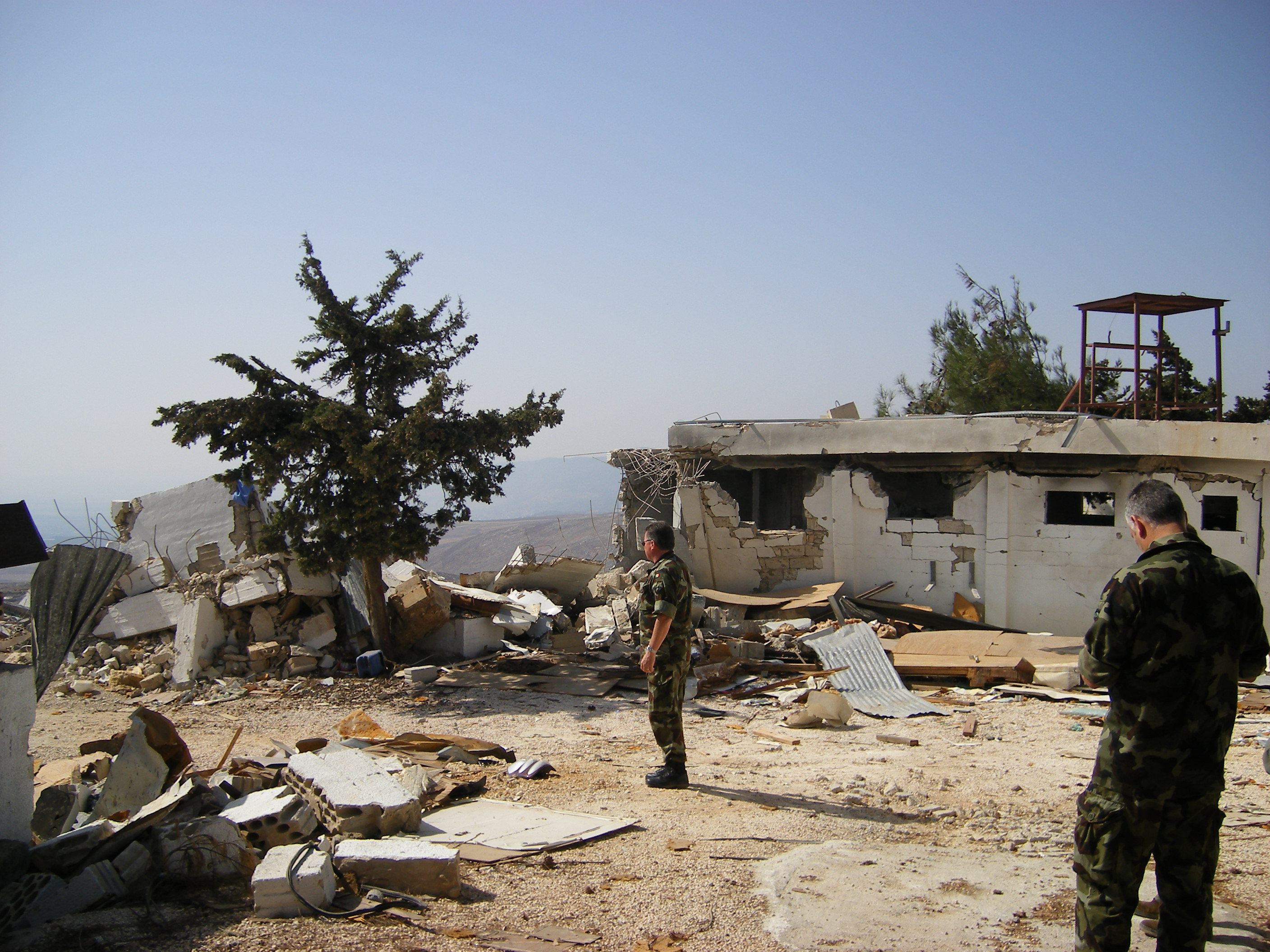
Aftermath of IDF airstrike on UN patrol base Khiam, Lebanon, 2006

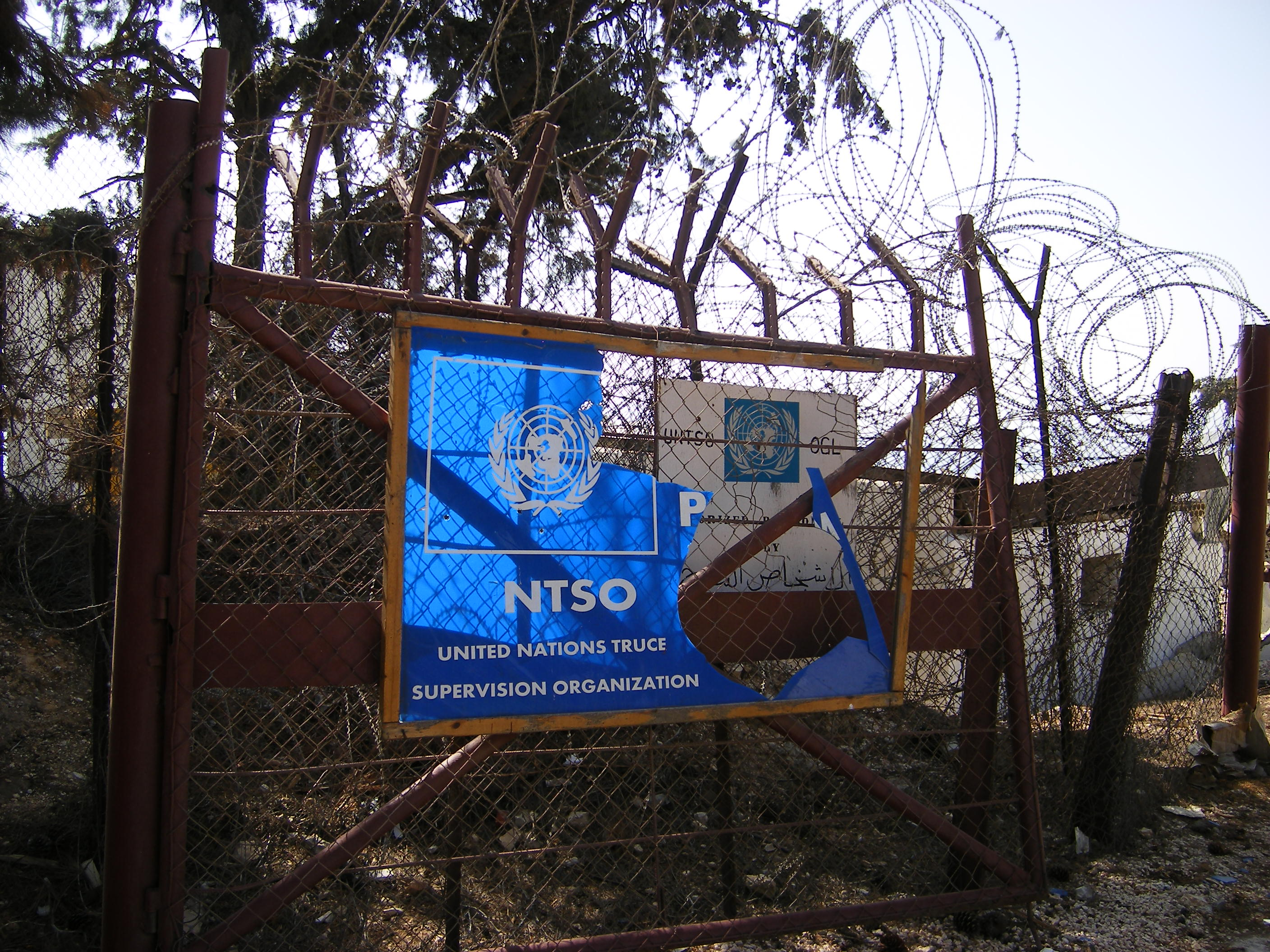
The entrance to the UN base where four UN peacekeepers were killed during the 2006 Lebanon conflict

During the 2006 July War, a number of international incidents occurred in Lebanon, largely involving United Nations personnel who have come under a number of attacks by Israeli forces.

Most notably on 25 July 2006, four unarmed United Nations Truce Supervision Organization (UNTSO) peacekeepers were killed during an Israeli air strike on a UN observation post in southern Lebanon. Israel later stated that the attack was an error due to the incorrect identification of the UN position as a militant enemy post. The observation post was built in 1948, had clear UN markings, and UN staff (including Deputy Secretary-General Mark Malloch Brown) had contacted the IDF at least 14 times telling them to call off the attack.

== UN operations in Lebanon ==
The United Nations Truce Supervision Organization (UNTSO) was created on 29 May 1948 following the founding of the state of Israel on 14 May 1948. Massive civil unrest and armed resistance from Palestinians against Zionism, alongside the immediate outbreak of war between Israel and Lebanon, Syria, Jordan and Egypt in support of Palestine, led the UN Security council to adopt UN Security Council Resolution 50 calling for an immediate truce and establishing a military force to oversee that it be carried out. The first Peacekeepers arrived in Palestine in June 1948, and saw their first casualty in July while investigating an alleged violation of the truce provisions by Israeli forces. Since then, UNTSO command structure was expanded to support UNIFIL and other similar operations in the region.

The United Nations Interim Force in Lebanon, or UNIFIL, was created by the United Nations through Security Council Resolution 425 and 426 on 19 March 1978. UNIFIL's objective was to confirm Israeli withdrawal from Lebanon, to restore international peace and security, and to help the Lebanese Government restore effective authority in the area. The first UNIFIL troops to arrive in the area on 23 March 1978 were reassigned from other UN peacekeeping operations in the area (namely UNEF and UNDOF). During the 1982 Lebanon War, U.N. positions were overrun, primarily by the South Lebanon Army forces under Major Saad Haddad. These were the indigenous Lebanese forces supported by the IDF. During the occupation, UNIFIL's function was mainly to provide humanitarian aid.

In 1999, Israel undertook a full withdrawal, which concluded in 2000 and enabled UNIFIL to resume its military tasks. The UN Security Council extended UNIFIL's mandate until 31 August 2006. About 50 members of the unarmed UNTSO were evacuated to lightly armed UNIFIL positions for security reasons during the 2006 July War in Lebanon. During this time (as in past conflicts) the peacekeeping force mainly came under attack from Israeli forces.

On 15 July 2006, the IDF unilaterally established a "security zone" along the Blue Line and informed the UNIFIL that any person or vehicle entering and approaching the Blue Line, including United Nations personnel, would be shot. This zone was directly within UNIFIL's area of operation, enveloped multiple UNIFIL positions, and Israeli policy made it impossible for UNIFIL positions to be evacuated or carry out their oversight role for either side of the conflict.

== 25 July 2006 attack on UN observation post ==
=== Attack ===
On 25 July 2006, the UNIFIL Khiyam base, which was primarily a simple white three-story building with UN markings, faced heavy artillery and aerial bombardment by the IDF over a period of 6 hours. According to the IDF, this was meant to target Hezbollah positions some 150 meters away, who were reportedly firing on them. A UN investigation found that no Hezbollah attack had taken place in that area that day. According to the UN, the post called an Israeli liaison officer at least 14 times throughout the day to call off the bombardment and an Israeli official promised to halt the bombing each time. The site of the observation post was well known, having been built in 1948 and clearly marked. Both sides in the conflict had the coordinates of the compound.

At 6:30pm, four artillery shells impacted and exploded within the position, destroying the main building and damaging the shelter underneath. The four unarmed United Nations Truce Supervision Organization (UNTSO) peacekeepers from Austria, China, Finland and Canada who occupied the post at the time were forced to flee to the damaged shelter underneath the building. At 7:25pm a 500 kilogram precision-guided bomb struck and destroyed both the base and bunker underneath, burying and killing everyone inside.

A UNIFIL rescue team of Indian soldiers was immediately dispatched to the scene. They recovered the bodies of three observers from the rubble while there was still active hostilities. Danny Ayalon, Israel's ambassador to the United States, said that "UNIFIL obviously got caught in the middle" of a gunfight between Hezbollah guerillas and Israeli troops. "We do not have yet confirmation what caused these deaths. It could be [Israel Defense Forces]. It could be Hezbollah," he said.

=== Victims ===
By 8 August 2006, the bodies of observers were retrieved and identified. The four victims of the attack, from UNTSO Team Sierra, were:

- Sierra Team Leader: Major Hans-Peter Lang, 44, from Güssing, Austria. He was survived by an 11-year-old son and his 70-year-old mother.
- Sierra Deputy Team Leader: Lieutenant Senior Grade Jarno Mäkinen, 29, from Kaarina, Finland. Lt Mäkinen was a former unit commander in the Nyland Brigade. He was transferred to the UNTSO in November 2005.
- Major (Posthumously promoted lieutenant colonel) Du Zhaoyu (杜照宇), 34, from Jinan, China. He had served as secretary to the military attache in the Embassy of China, New Delhi, India. He left his wife and a one-year-old son.
- Major Paeta Derek Hess-von Kruedener, from Kingston, Canada. A member of the Princess Patricia's Canadian Light Infantry, he had previously served in Cyprus, Bosnia and Congo before serving in UNTSO from October 2005.

=== Responses ===
==== United Nations ====
Secretary-General Kofi Annan initially stated that he was "...shocked and deeply distressed by the apparently deliberate targeting by Israeli Defence Forces." "This coordinated artillery and aerial attack on a long-established and clearly marked U.N. post at Khiyam occurred despite personal assurances given to me by Prime Minister Ehud Olmert that U.N. positions would be spared Israeli fire," he said in a statement. "Furthermore, General Alain Pellegrini, the U.N. force commander in south Lebanon, had been in repeated contact with Israeli officers throughout the day, stressing the need to protect that particular U.N. position from attack."

At a later press conference the day after a phone call with Israeli prime minister Ehud Olmert, Annan seemed to soften his stance and clarified that "[t]he statement said 'apparently deliberate targeting,'" stressing that the word "apparent is important in this." He added that he spoke to Olmert and accepted his "deep sorrow" for the incident, which he said Olmert "definitely believes" was a mistake that will be investigated.

The United Nations Security Council failed to agree on a statement responding to the Israeli attack after the United States refused to accept language condemning: "any deliberate attack against U.N. personnel." On 27 July, the Security Council issued a statement calling on the Israeli government to conduct a comprehensive inquiry into the incident and stressed that "Israel and all concerned parties" must comply with their obligations under international humanitarian law on the protection of UN personnel. Many within the UN called for a joint UN-Israeli investigation into the incident. Israel refused.

A UN officer stationed in Lebanon would later note that the biggest area to maneuver heavy armor was in the valley directly below the UNIFIL Khiyam base, and if the IDF did not want this observed, they would have to get rid of it.

==== Israel ====
Danny Ayalon, Israeli ambassador to the United States, called Annan's statement "outrageous". Israel's U.N. ambassador, Dan Gillerman, said he, too, was "deeply distressed" that Annan alleged that the strike was deliberate. "I am surprised at these premature and erroneous assertions made by the secretary-general, who while demanding an investigation, has already issued its conclusions," Gillerman said in a statement. Many right-leaning and Israeli news outlets described Annan’s statement as indicative of the UN's anti-Israel bias.

An Israeli senior commander stated that Hezbollah forces fired rockets from as little as 30–40 metres (98–131 ft) from UNIFIL bases, seeking to avoid Israeli counter-fire, and had sought refuge in UNIFIL bases on occasion. UNIFIL maintained that Hezbollah fighters were not allowed into any of its bases. However, they reported more than 20 instances of rockets being fired from less than 500m from their positions, as well as a number of cases of small arms and mortar fire from within 100m. Additionally, UNIFIL reported several instances of their positions and vehicles being hit by Hezbollah mortars, small arms fire, or rockets.

On 26 July 2006, Prime Minister Ehud Olmert phoned Kofi Annan and expressed his deep regret over the death of the four UN observers. He promised that Israel would thoroughly investigate the incident and would share the findings with Annan, but said that he was taken aback by secretary general’s statement saying that the Israeli attack on the UN post was "apparently deliberate".

Ambassador Gillerman ruled out major U.N. involvement in any potential international force in Lebanon, deriding the UN peacekeepers in Lebanon, saying that "It has never been able to prevent any shelling of Israel, any terrorist attack, any kidnappings... They either didn't see or didn't know or didn't want to see, but they have been hopeless." On the question of what would replace the UN peacekeepers, Gillerman stated that more "professional" troops "from countries who have the training and capabilities to be effective" were needed for such a volatile situation.

In an interview with Reuters, Israeli Foreign Ministry spokesman Mark Regev said that "Israel sincerely regrets the tragic death of the UN personnel in south Lebanon. We do not target UN personnel and, since the beginning of this conflict, we have made a consistent effort to ensure the safety of all members of (the UN peacekeeping force). This tragic event will be thoroughly investigated."

==== Canada ====
In response to the killing, a Board of Inquiry was convened by Lieutenant Governor J.C.M. Gautier. The board report had found Israel to be at fault for the incident, and noted that Israel had refused to cooperate with the investigation, providing only a "non-paper" summary of its own investigation.

Canada’s prime minister during the conflict, Stephen Harper, a staunch supporter of Israel and critic of the UN, said he did not believe Israel targeted the post, and pointed to the fact that Israel has been "co-operating with us in our evacuation efforts, in our efforts to move Canadian citizens out of Lebanon, and also trying to keep our own troops that are on the ground involved in the evacuation out of harm's way."

Hess-Von Krudener's widow, Cynthia Hess-Von Kruedener said in a 2008 CBC interview the she believed that the bombing was a deliberate act by Israeli forces, due to her husbands reporting of what he suggested were war crimes committed by Israeli forces. She remarked in a letter, in response to the Canadian government's inquiry into the incident:

If 6 hours of artillery shelling was an operational error – and bombing a UN bunker was an operational error – what are the odds that two operational errors (land and air) occurred within an hour of each other and in the same place? ... This was not an accident.

==== Ireland ====
Ireland's foreign minister Dermot Ahern and its defence minister Willie O'Dea were angered because Irish peace keeping troops had been on duty in the observation post 24 hours before the strike. They also said that a senior Irish soldier working for the UN forces was in contact with the Israeli Defence Force's UNIFIL liaison office six times to warn them that their bombardment was endangering the lives of UN staff. Both Ministers called in the Israeli ambassador to Ireland to express their anger and dissatisfaction.

Ireland has filed an official protest with Israel.

==== China ====
China strongly condemned the action and demanded a thorough investigation and formal apology from Israel for the attack. 180 Chinese military officers and engineers were in Lebanon as part of UN peacekeeping operations at the time. Lt. Colonel Du Zhaoyu's body was brought back to China in a large ceremony attended by PLA Assistant Chief of General Staff Zhang Qinsheng and China's Assistant Foreign Minister Cui Tiankai, along with over 100 Chinese military officers. In 2021, representatives from the Chinese contingent of the UN Peacekeepers and the Chinese embassy to Lebanon took part in a memorial ceremony at the site of the attack.

==== Austria ====
Austria's foreign minister, Ursula Plassnik, told her Israeli counterpart by telephone that the bombing was unacceptable and urged Israel to stop its attack on the area.

=== Investigation into the bombing ===
==== United Nations Investigation ====
The UN Investigations on the 25th of July incident found no justification for it or the 29 other instances it found of the IDF "directly attacking" UN peacekeeping personnel during the month-long conflict. It additionally found that the IDF justification for these attacks and repeated attacks on Civilian infrastructure, which generally centered around Hezbollah either hiding within/near or utilizing these facilities, was too broad and fell apart under scrutiny. One report summary states that "[b]y using this argument, the IDF effectively changed the status of all civilian objects by alleging that they might be used by Hezbollah. Further, the Commission is convinced that damage inflicted on some infrastructure was done for the sake of destruction."

The report into the wider conflict concludes:

- UNIFIL positions were clearly marked and most (including the one attacked) were located on prominent hilltops to carry out their observation role. The IDF was provided the exact 12-figure coordinates for all of them.
- There were 30 recorded direct attacks on UNIFIL personnel and positions and 208 "close firings" by the IDF. Many of them injured or killed UN personnel. As they are not parties to the conflict, UN personnel are considered civilians and any intentional targeting of UN positions and personnel is a war crime by the International Criminal Court. "The Commission does not see how the IDF can possibly justify the 30 direct attacks on UN positions and the deaths and injury to protected UN personnel."
- There was a dramatic increase in direct hits on UNIFIL positions by the IDF after the announcement of the ceasefire on 13 August. On the 13th the UN recorded five direct hits on three UNIFIL positions. The next day this number nearly doubled and was directed at more positions. The escalation of these attacks cannot be justified as being of any reasonable necessity in any conflict against Hezbollah.
- 85 artillery shells impacted inside UNIFIL bases over those two days, causing massive damage to all positions. UNIFIL personnel were forced into shelters and could not perform their duties.
- There were no Hezbollah attacks coming from within the vicinity of the UNIFIL Khiyam base on 25 July 2006, and even if there were, the fact that Israel utilizes precision-guided munitions makes the idea UN positions being caught as collateral damage due to targets being in "the vicinity" dubious.
- The killing blow on UNIFIL Khiyam base was delivered by a 500 kilogram precision-guided aerial bomb dropped by an IDF plane. The Israeli government has admitted this and accepted full responsibility. UNIFIL had protested to the IDF after each incident of attacks in or near the base, and Israeli refusal to allow the UN access to IDF documents and personnel has prevented them from ascertaining why the attacks on UN positions were not halted.
- There were 6 incidents of Hezbollah targeting UNIFIL positions and 62 incidents where Hezbollah fired their rockets from the close proximity of UN positions towards Israel. This proximity placed UN personnel directly in danger due to the bombing tactics utilized by Israel.

==== Israeli Investigation ====
Israel launched an investigation into the bombing and concluded that the incident was a case of "human error". The report says incorrectly copied military maps meant the post was wrongly identified, and Israeli aircraft attacked the post in the belief it was a Hezbollah position. Israel's foreign ministry spokesman, Mark Regev, assured that the report concludes the attack was human error and that the UN and relevant countries had been allowed to read the report. Israel did not make the report public.

==== Canadian Investigation and 18 July email message ====
In 2008, a Canadian board of inquiry released a report on the attack. The report blamed the Israeli Defence Forces for the incident. It also stated that both the Israeli military and the UN refused to provide requested documents for the investigation, and Israel failed to make their investigation available to Canadian authorities. Instead, Israel provided a summary "which lacked sufficient detail to explore certain issues to their fullest extent." Citing "security reasons", the Canadian report was removed from the Canadian government's website under Conservative Prime Minister Stephen Harper and has not been restored as of November 2023. Major Paeta Hess-von Kruedener's widow, Cynthia, denounced this decision and accused Prime Minister Harper of shielding Israel.

In an email dated 18 July received by CTV and published 24 July, the deceased Canadian peacekeeper Major Paeta Hess-von Kruedener, stated: "What I can tell you is this: we have on a daily basis had numerous occasions where our position has come under direct or indirect fire from both artillery and aerial bombing. The closest artillery has landed within 2 meters of our position and the closest 1000 lb aerial bomb has landed 100 meters from our patrol base. This has not been deliberate targeting, but has rather been due to tactical necessity."

According to retired Canadian major general Lewis MacKenzie, interviewed on CBC radio on 26 July, Hess-von Kruedener's phrase "due to tactical necessity" was "veiled speech in the military. What he was telling us was Hezbollah fighters were all over his position and the IDF were targeting them." However, von Kruedener's widow stated on 29 July that she blamed the IDF for her husband’s death. She said "Why did they bomb the UN site? In my opinion, those are precision-guided missiles [so] then that it is intentional....And that wasn't the only day they were firing on that base. My information from him [her husband] is that week upon week they had been firing on there, bombing near it."

=== Memorial ===
As of 2023 the base remains in ruins. On its grounds is now a memorial consisting of two T-shaped walls with the portraits of the fallen UN peacekeepers hanging from it. In 2021, a ceremony was held at the site attended by representatives from the UN and the countries of the victims marking the 15th anniversary of the attack.

== Other incidents ==
The UNIFIL press releases mention dozen of attacks and near misses on its presence during the present conflict. UNIFIL recorded a total of 30 instances of direct attacks and 208 "close firings" on UNIFIL positions by the IDF, and 6 direct attacks by Hezbollah.

- UN personnel were pelted with stones by an angry Lebanese crowd after recovering bodies from the aftermath of an IAF airstrike on a convoy fleeing Marwaheen close to Tyre.
- Shrapnel from tank shells fired by the IDF seriously wounded an Indian soldier on 16 July.
- A UNIFIL international staff member and his wife were killed after the Israeli air force bombed the Hosh district of Tyre, Lebanon, where they lived on 17 July. Their bodies were recovered from the rubble on 26 July.
- Hezbollah fire wounded an Italian OGL observer on the border on 23 July.
- An IDF tank shell hit a UNIFIL position south of Rmaich on Monday 24 July, wounding four Ghanaian soldiers.
- On 25 July, Hezbollah opened fire on a UNIFIL convoy, forcing it to retreat.
- On 29 July, two Indian UN soldiers were wounded after their post was damaged during an IAF airstrike in Southern Lebanon.
- On 30 July, following an airstrike on a house in Qana where 28 civilians are confirmed killed with 13 missing, thousands of Lebanese protesters who had reportedly gathered spontaneously in the city centre attacked the UN building in Beirut along with UN staff.
- On 6 August, a Hezbollah rocket hit the headquarters of the Chinese UNIFIL contingent, injuring three Chinese peacekeepers.
- On 6 August, UNIFIL announced that "[s]ince the outbreak of hostilities, four military observers from OGL, one UNIFIL international staff member and his wife were killed, and four Ghanaian soldiers, three Indian soldiers, three Chinese soldiers and one OGL military observer were wounded as a result of firing."
- On 12 August, UNIFIL announced that a Ghanaian peacekeeper had been wounded by IDF artillery fire near the southern village of Hariss.
- On 14 August, the IDF targeted what it said was a Palestinian faction in the Ein el-Hilweh refugee camp in Saida. Two missiles were fired into a civilian residential area and killed UNRWA staff member Mr. Abdel Saghir.

== Total casualties ==
Country	Civilian	Military
Austria		1 dead
Canada		1 dead
China, People’s Republic of		1 dead 3 wounded
Finland		1 dead
Ghana		5 wounded
India		3 wounded
Italy		1 wounded
Nigeria	1 dead	
Total	1 dead	4 dead 12 wounded

== Israeli flyovers ==
In the aftermath of the war, aircraft of the Israeli Air Force began fly over Lebanon. In September 2006, Major General Alain Pellegrini of France, commander of UNIFIL, warned that the flyovers violated the cease-fire, and that force might be used to stop the incursions. In October 2006, a number of incidents between the Israeli Air Force and UN peacekeepers took place:

- On 3 October 2006, an Israeli fighter jet penetrated the 2-nautical-mile (3.7 km) defence perimeter of the French frigate Courbet, triggering a diplomatic incident between Israel and France. Israel apologized after official protests from France.
- On 24 October 2006, six Israeli fighter jets flew over a German vessel patrolling off Israel's coast just south of Lebanon, after a helicopter took off from the vessel without Israeli permission. The German Defense Ministry claimed that the planes fired flares, and one fired two shots into the air. Israeli officials denied the claim of two shots being fired, but claimed they did not know whether flares had been used.
- On 31 October 2006, eight Israeli F-15 fighter jets flew over many areas of Lebanon, including Beirut. The jets also nose-dived over a French peacekeeping position in what was interpreted as attack formation. French troops responded by readying an anti-aircraft missile. According to French defence minister Michele Alliot-Marie, the troops were "seconds away" from firing the missile at the jets.

== See also ==
- Israel and the United Nations
- United Nations Interim Force in Lebanon
- United Nations Truce Supervision Organization
- Attacks on humanitarian workers
