= Battle of Khiam (2026) =

Battle during the 2026 Lebanon War

- Part of 2026 Lebanon War and 2026 Iran War
Date	4 March 2026 – c. 24 May 2026
Location	Al-Khiyam, Lebanon
Status	Israeli victory

Belligerents
Israel	Hezbollah; Amal Movement

Units involved
Israel Defense Forces; Israeli Ground Forces; 91st Division; Givati Brigade; Israeli Air Force	Hezbollah military; Local garrison; Radwan Force

Casualties and losses
Unknown	Unknown

The Battle of Khiam (or Battle of Al-Khiyam) was a battle in the 2026 Lebanon war, within the context of the wider 2026 Iran war. The battle began in early March 2026, following the outbreak of large-scale hostilities between Israel and Hezbollah on 2 March 2026, when Hezbollah resumed rocket attacks on Israel and Israeli forces launched a sustained air and ground campaign across southern Lebanon. Khiam (also known as Al-Khiyam), a strategically significant hilltop town near the Israeli border and a key gateway to the Beqaa Valley, quickly became one of the primary focal points of fighting as Israeli forces sought to expand a security zone and disrupt Hezbollah supply lines.

== Background ==
=== Importance of Khiam ===
Pretty much like Bint Jbeil, Khiam, over the years, has become a symbol of "resistance" in Hezbollah's narrative after not capitulating in the Battle of Khiam that took place in 2000 and the one that took place in 2024. The town is also symbolically and ideologically important to the Israeli, who see it as the launchpoint of the 2006 Lebanon War.

The town strategic and military value is also significant due to its location adjacent to the Marjeyoun Plain, the Israeli border, the proximity to roads connecting the supply lines between Hezbollah positions in the Bekaa Valley and Southern Lebanon and the nearby Shebaa Farms which are a contested territory for economic and social reasons.

=== Start of hostilities ===
During the campaign, U.S. and Israeli strikes killed Iran's Supreme Leader, Ali Khamenei. Following Iranian confirmation of his death on 1 March, Hezbollah Secretary-General Naim Qassem vowed to retaliate and "undertake our duty of confronting the aggression", stating that Hezbollah would not leave "the field of honour and resistance".

On 2 March, Hezbollah launched several projectiles into northern Israel, its first such attack since the 2024 ceasefire, targeting a missile defence site near Haifa. The group described the attack as a "defensive act" aimed at forcing Israel to halt its operations in Lebanon and withdraw from occupied areas, stating it was unrelated to the Iran war.

The Israel Defense Forces (IDF) said one projectile was intercepted while others landed in open areas. In response, Israel carried out overnight airstrikes in Beirut and across southern Lebanon, issuing evacuation orders for dozens of communities. The IDF stated the strikes targeted senior Hezbollah figures and infrastructure; it later reported killing Hezbollah intelligence chief Hussain Makled, while early reports suggested other senior leaders may also have been targeted.

== Timeline prior to ceasefire (4 March - 16 April) ==
=== 4 March ===
Israeli airstrikes and artillery strikes on the town intensified and Lebanese media recorded the first instance of Israeli boots on the ground within the town. It was also reported that Hezbollah responded by attempting to strike the headquarters of the Israeli Aerospace Industries (IAI) company with a swarm of drones. The incursion was followed by evacuation orders by the IDF telling residents to evacuate the town and flee past the Litani River. This was the start of the de facto battle, even if pro-Hezbollah and pro-Houthi newspapers, such as Ansarollah, claimed it started on 10 March 2026.

In order to secure nearby territories, the IDF, also attempted to occupy the nearby locality of Dhaira, meeting resistance.

=== 5 March ===
Hezbollah confirmed reports of direct clashes within the town of Khiam and Dhayra between their own militants and the IDF, claiming alleged Israeli casualties, however, not specifying the quantity. The confrontation, once again according to Hezbollah, led the IDF to retreat its previously spotted vehicles and soldiers away from Khiam and back to the town of Tal al-Hamamis, where Hezbollah then attacked them with a barrage of missiles.

=== 6 March ===
It was reported that Hezbollah utilised heavy machine guns and anti-tank rockets in their attempt to repel an Israeli vehicle incursion attempting to enter the town another time from its eastern sector. It was reported that Hezbollah also deployed the elite Radwan Force.

=== 7 March ===
Hezbollah claimed an ambush on IDF forces attempting to enter within the town. The fighting was described as intense.

=== 8 March ===
Reports from the town suggested that the IDF pursued artillery and white phosphorus shelling against positions.

=== 10 March ===
Hezbollah reported about allegedly ambushing three Merkava Israeli tanks in the proximity of Khiam at approximately 02:30 a.m (local time). This led the IDF to retreat from the town for the third time according to reports.

=== 11 March ===
Ansarollah, a newspaper tied to both Hezbollah and the Houthis, reported the start of "Operation Al-Asf al-Ma'kul", which had the objective to target Israeli assemblies south of Khiam, as well as the Manara and Markaba locations.

=== 14 March ===
Direct clashes between Hezbollah and the IDF were once again reported and they lasted overnight.

=== 15 March ===
Following the outcome of the battle that occurred on the previous day, the IDF advanced towards the town itself, once again being met with heavy clashes on its way to the town. Hezbollah claimed to have hit another Merkava tank in the proximity of the detention center of Khiam during the clashes. Two significant strikes by the IDF hit the town.

=== 16 March ===
Operations against Hezbollah by Israel intensified, including in Khiam, targeted alongside other sites by the 91st Division. IDF attempts to enter the town were confirmed to have been repelled and met with Hezbollah's resistance by local residents according to The New York Times. Strikes on the town continued up to the following day, with smoke visible from nearby villages.

=== 19 March ===
According to the Israel, the town, following clashes was "almost on the verge" of being captured by the IDF. The Israeli source also confirmed that Hezbollah was adopting a guerrilla strategy of fighting in "small groups" in an attempt to repel their advances.

=== 21 March ===
Hezbollah confirmed ongoing clashes with the IDF within the eastern quarters of the town.

=== 22 March ===
Following the clashes in the eastern quarter, the IDF advances towards the northern quarters in an attempt to bypass the northern-eastern and southern-eastern quarters (in the area of the local prison) and penetrate the town's centre from there. A four hours long close combat gun battle, with the use of medium machine guns from both sides, was recorded between Hezbollah and the IDF in the streets of the town. Successful Israeli advances in the town were recorded.

=== 23 March ===
A mosque was bombed by the IDF, drawing condemnation from The Council on American-Islamic Relations. The IDF was reported as "operating inside the town" itself, however, yet to fully control it.

=== 24 March ===
Israel reported that the Givati Brigade was conducting clearing operations in the town. The following day the IDF clarified that they were "carrying out systematic work in the town to locate terrorists", blaming Lebanon for not doing so. Fierce clashes in northern-eastern Khiam were also recorded.

=== 27 March ===
The Givati Brigade claimed to have located a Hezbollah tunnel beneath a church and a school in the town, stating it was proof of the exploitation of local civilians and civilian infrastructure by Hezbollah. Reports of military depots containing mines, machine guns, rifles, shells, and additional military equipment attributed to the Amal Movement surfaced.

=== 29 March ===
Some sources stated that the town had been effectively "conquered" by the IDF. Reports suggested that the IDF had gained full control of the prison area of Khiam, however, Hezbollah continued to attempt resistance through the use of drone warfare in the area.

=== 30 March ===
Satellite images revealed that Khiam Detention Center, also known as Khiam's prison, was demolished and razed by the IDF following its capture the previous days.

=== 1 April ===
It was reported that heavy clashes took place with light and medium weapons, rockets, and artillery near the town. Clashes seems to have focused on the eastern quarters of the town.

=== 16 April ===
It was reported that, despite earlier claims by Israeli sources of "having conquered" Khiam, the town northern quarters remained unconquered.

== Timeline following ceasefire (17 April - 24 May) ==
=== 17 April ===
Following the signing of the ceasefire satellite footage showed various residential buildings in Khiam, and other Lebanese towns, being systematically demolished.

=== 22 April ===
During operations the IDF uncovered Hezbollah weapons caches composed of various weapons, observation equipment, an RPG launcher, ammunition, and a Hezbollah flag.

=== 5 May ===
Eyal Zamir visited the area and stated that the IDF's main role in the operation was to "to eliminate every threat facing the town and the soldiers".

=== 17 May ===
Severe ground clashes between Hezbollah and the IDF were reported by L'Orient Le Jour within the city of Khiam itself.

=== 21 May ===
Hezbollah claimed that the battle in the town was still ongoing, allegedly detonating an explosive against Israeli forces at 6:30 p.m and confronting the forces in the southern district of the town.

=== 24 May ===
A map by the Institute for the Study of War showed the town of Khiam as under the full occupation of the Israeli Defense Forces.
