= United Nations Security Council Resolution 46 =

United Nations Security Council resolution

UN Security Council Resolution 46
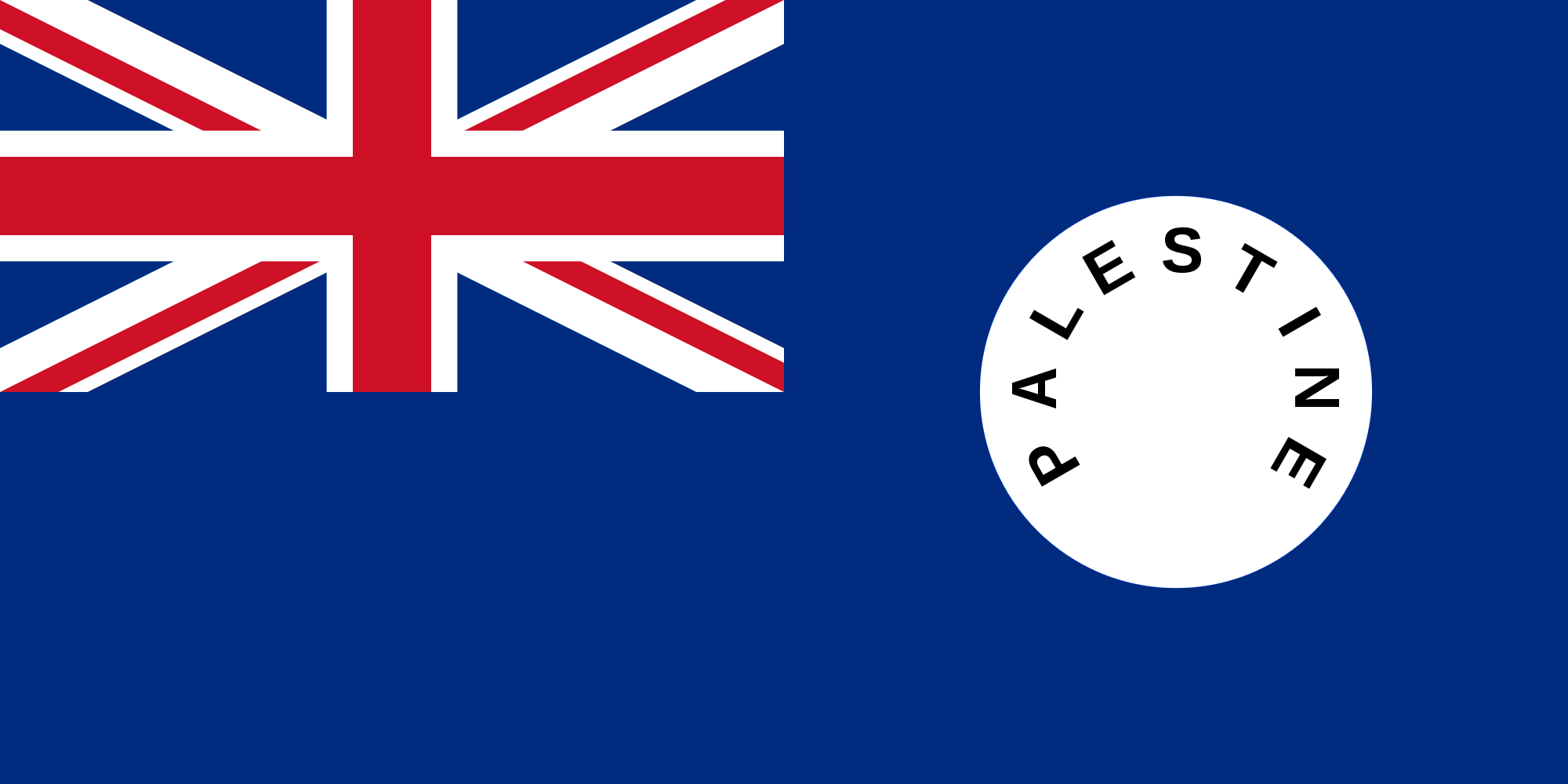
- Palestine flag
- Date: April 17 1948
- Meeting no.: 279
- Code: S/723 (Document)
- Subject: The Palestine Question
- Voting summary: 9 voted for; None voted against; 2 abstained
- Result: Adopted

Security Council composition
- Permanent members: China; France; Soviet Union; United Kingdom; United States
- Non-permanent members: Argentina; Belgium; Canada; Colombia; Syria; Ukrainian SSR

United Nations Security Council Resolution 46 was adopted on 17 April 1948. The Council, referencing Resolution 43, stated that the United Kingdom was the mandatory power in charge of the Palestinian territory and was thus responsible "for the maintenance of peace and order" in the area, and that all members of the United Nations should provide their cooperation and support.

The Council called upon all persons and organizations in Palestine, especially the Arab Higher Committee and the Jewish Agency, to cease acts of violence, prevent the entry of combatants to the territory, stop the import of weapons, refrain from political activity, cooperate with British authorities, and refrain from any actions that may endanger places of worship.

The Council also called upon the United Kingdom and the countries bordering Palestine to enforce these requests.

Resolution 46 passed with nine votes to none. The Soviet Union and the Ukrainian SSR abstained.

== See also ==
- United Nations Security Council Resolution 48
- United Nations Security Council Resolution 49
- United Nations Security Council Resolution 50
- List of United Nations Security Council Resolutions 1 to 100 (1946–1953)
