= United Nations Truce Supervision Organization =

UN peacekeeping mission in the Middle East

Coordinates: 31°45′16″N 35°14′10″E

- Abbreviation: UNTSO
- Formation: 29 May 1948; 78 years ago
- Type: Peacekeeping Mission
- Legal status: Active
- Headquarters: Jerusalem
- Parent organization: UN Security Council
- Website: untso.unmissions.org

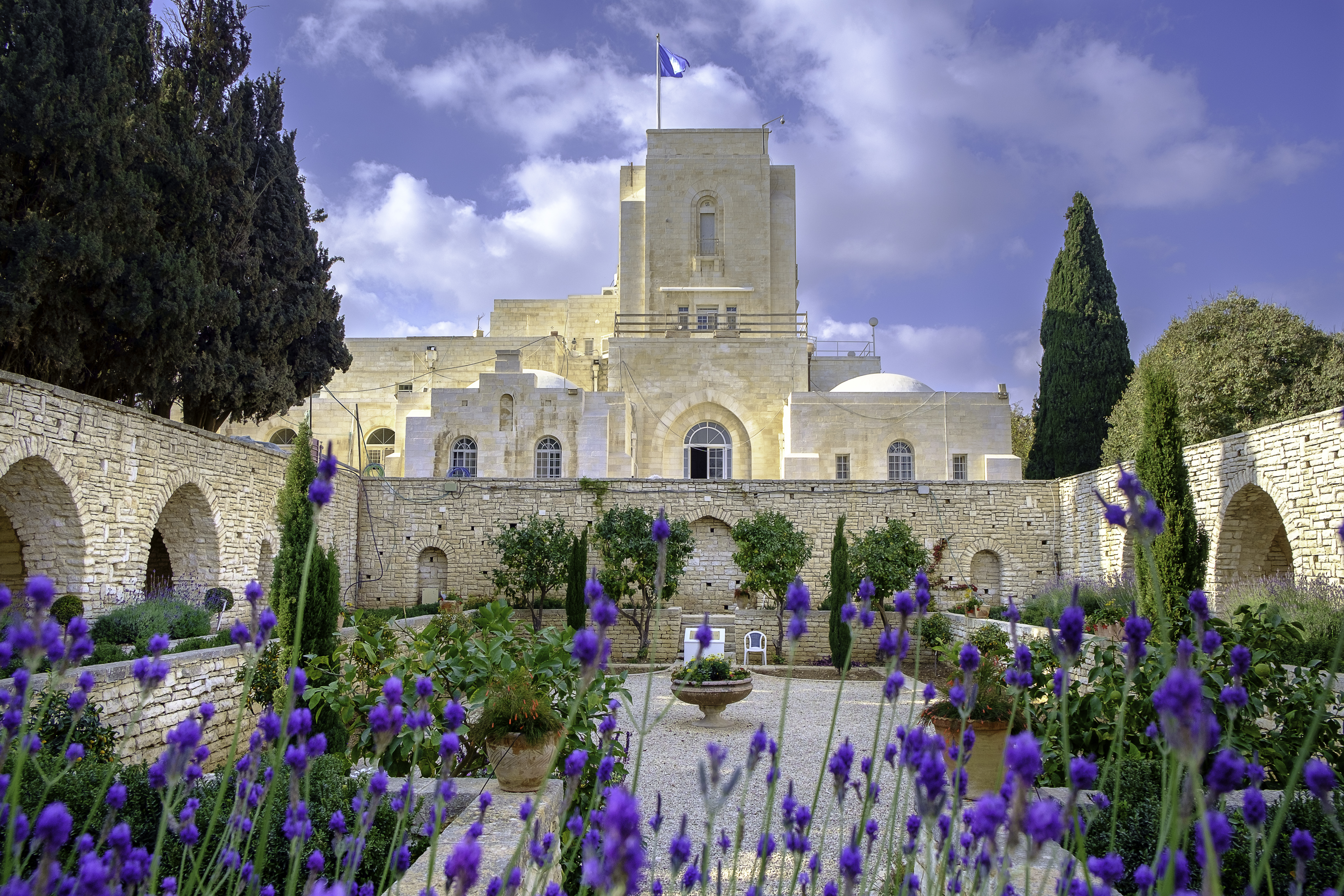
UNTSO headquarters, Armon Hanatziv neighborhood, Jerusalem

The United Nations Truce Supervision Organization (UNTSO) is an organization founded on 29 May 1948 for peacekeeping in the Middle East. Established amidst the 1948 Arab–Israeli War, its primary task was initially to provide the military command structure to the peacekeeping forces in the Middle East to enable the peacekeepers to observe and maintain the ceasefire, and in assisting the parties to the Armistice Agreements in the supervision of the application and observance of the terms of those Agreements. The organization's structure and role has evolved over time as a result of the various conflicts in the region and at times UNTSO personnel have been used to rapidly deploy to other areas of the Middle East in support of other United Nations operations. The command structure of the UNTSO was maintained to cover the later peacekeeping organisations of the United Nations Disengagement Observer Force (UNDOF) and the United Nations Interim Force in Lebanon (UNIFIL) to which UNTSO continues to provide military observers.

== Background ==
On 29 November 1947, the United Nations General Assembly adopted Resolution 181 on "the future constitution and government of Palestine" setting forth a "Plan of Partition with Economic Union". The result of the vote was 33 in favour, 13 against and 10 abstentions. (Note: "A vote was taken by roll-call. The result of the vote was as follows: In favour: Australia, Belgium, Bolivia, Brazil, Byelorussian Soviet Socialist Republic, Canada, Costa Rica, Czechoslovakia, Denmark, Dominican Republic, Ecuador, France, Guatemala, Haiti, Iceland, Liberia, Luxembourg, Netherlands, New Zealand, Nicaragua, Norway, Panama, Paraguay, Peru, Philippines, Poland, Sweden, Ukrainian Soviet Socialist Republic, Union of South Africa, Union of Soviet Socialist Republics, United States of America, Uruguay, Venezuela. Against: Afghanistan, Cuba, Egypt, Greece, India, Iran, Iraq, Lebanon, Pakistan, Saudi Arabia, Syria, Turkey, Yemen. Abstained: Argentina, Chile, China, Colombia, El Salvador, Ethiopia, Honduras, Mexico, United Kingdom, Yugoslavia. The report was adopted by 33 votes to 13, with 10 abstentions.") The report consisted of four parts: future constitution and government of Palestine; boundaries; city of Jerusalem; and capitulations. It called for the creation of Arab and Jewish states no later than 1 October 1948, with Jerusalem as corpus separatum under an international regime to be administered by the U.N. with the Trusteeship Council being the designated body in this regard. The plan also included steps to be taken prior to independence, including the issues of citizenship, transit, economic union between the two states, access to holy places and religious and minority rights. Resolution 181 (II) also established the United Nations Palestine Commission to carry out the plan. The Trusteeship Council was to administer Palestine for ten years.

As the civil war in Palestine began to escalate the Security Council voted on and adopted Resolution 42 (1948) of 5 March 1948, appealing to all governments and peoples, particularly in and around Palestine, to take all possible action to prevent or reduce such disorders as were occurring in Palestine. The Trusteeship Council decided on 10 March 1948 in resolution 32 (II) "that the statute on Jerusalem was in satisfactory form and agrees that the question of its formal approval, together with the appointment of a governor of the city, shall be taken up at a subsequent meeting to be held not later than one week before 29 April 1948", the deadline given to the council by the assembly. On 21 April 1948, the Trusteeship Council transmitted the Resolution along with the draft statute to the General Assembly.

The situation in Palestine was becoming even more chaotic when the Security Council met on 1 April 1948 it adopted Resolution 43 (1948), calling for an "immediate truce be effected in Palestine" and for "the Jewish Agency for Palestine and the Arab Higher Committee to make representatives available to the Security Council for the purpose of arranging a truce between the Arab and Jewish communities of Palestine; and emphasizes the heavy responsibility which would fall upon any party failing to observe such a truce". The Security Council adopted Resolution 44 (1948), invoking Article 20 of the U.N. Charter on 1 April 1948 where the Security Council requested the Secretary-General to convoke a special session of the General Assembly to consider further the future of the government of Palestine.

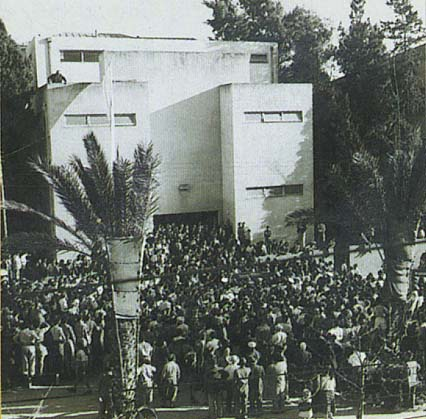
A large crowd assembled outside the Dizengoff House to hear the declaration of Israel's independence, 14 May 1948

By 17 April 1948, the situation in Palestine had deteriorated further and the Security Council adopted Resolution 46 (1948), calling upon all persons and organizations in Palestine to immediately cease all military activities, as well as acts of violence, terrorism and sabotage; to refrain from any actions endangering the safety of the Holy Places in Palestine and refrain from importing or acquiring or assisting or encouraging the importation or acquisition of weapons and war materials (arms embargo). It also requested the government of the U.K., as the Mandatory Power, to supervise the execution of those measures and to keep the Security Council and the General Assembly informed on the situation in Palestine.

The General Assembly then convened for its second special session between 16 April to 14 May 1948, during which it considered a working paper submitted by the United States (U.S.) on the question of the "Trusteeship of Palestine", which was opposed by the Union of Soviet Socialist Republics (U.S.S.R.) as well as the Jewish Agency. The assembly adopted resolution 185 (S-2) of 26 April 1948, asking the Trusteeship Council to study measures for the protection of Jerusalem, its inhabitants and to submit proposals to the General Assembly.

On 14 May 1948, the assembly adopted Resolution 186 (S-2), which affirmed its support for the efforts of the Security Council to secure a truce in Palestine. The assembly also decided to appoint a U.N. Mediator to Palestine and specified the functions of the mediator, relieving the Palestine Commission from further "exercise of responsibilities" under resolution 181 (II). Bernadotte was appointed Mediator. After receiving proposals from the Trusteeship Council, the assembly adopted Resolution 187 (S-2), recommending to the Mandatory Power the appointment of a Special Municipal Commissioner for Jerusalem.

The Jewish state of Israel was proclaimed on 14 May 1948, taking effect at midnight that day, as the British mandate expired the following day. The U.S. had proposed the establishment of a trusteeship for Palestine; nevertheless, the U.S. government recognized the Jewish state as did the U.S.S.R. The 1948 Arab–Israeli War broke out shortly afterwards when Lebanon, Syria, Jordan and Egypt invaded the newly proclaimed state.

== History ==
According to the United Nations, "following the wars of 1948, 1956, 1967 and 1973, [UNTSO's] functions...[have evolved]... in the light of changing circumstances, but they [have] remained in the area, acting as go-betweens for the hostile parties and as the means by which isolated incidents could be contained and prevented from escalating into major conflicts."

=== Establishment ===
In response to a request from Count Folke Bernadotte, the Swedish United Nations Mediator for Palestine, the Secretary-General of the United Nations, Trygve Lie, sent 50 members of the United Nations guard force from Lake Success to assist the mediator in supervising the truce in the former British Mandate of Palestine in 1948. The first peacekeeping operation was established by the United Nations. All the members of the party were experienced international civil servants with a background of service with the United Nations Secretariat at Headquarters. While on duty in Palestine, they were to continue to wear United Nations guard uniforms. United Nations military observers (UNMOs) remain in the Middle East to monitor ceasefires, supervise armistice agreements, prevent isolated incidents from escalating and assist other UN peacekeeping operations in the region. This resolution formed the basis for the establishment of the first UN peacekeeping operation which became known as the United Nations Truce Supervision Organization (UNTSO).

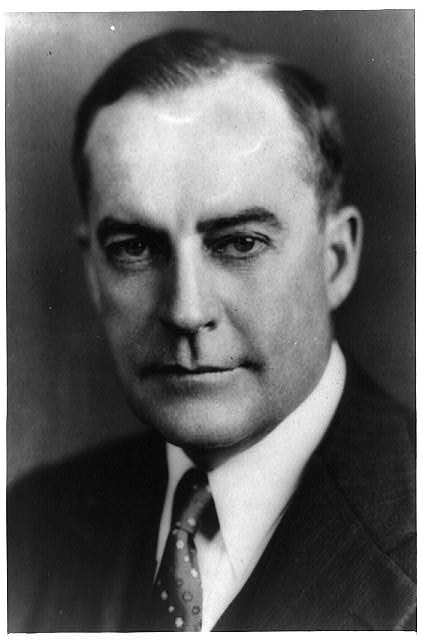
Thomas C. Wasson, US member of the Truce Commission, assassinated in Jerusalem, 22 May 1948

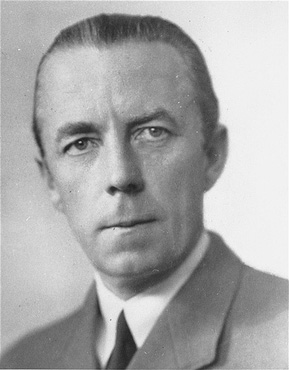
Count Folke Bernadotte, the United Nations Mediator for Palestine

Prior to this, in November 1947, the United Nations General Assembly endorsed a plan for the partition of the then British Mandate of Palestine, providing for the creation of an Arab State and a Jewish State, with Jerusalem to be placed in Trusteeship with international status. The plan was not accepted by the Palestinian Arabs and Arab States and only partially accepted by the Jewish Agency. (Note: Able Hillel Silver, Chairman of the American Section of the Jewish Agency made the case for a Jewish state to the ad hoc committee on Palestine at the UN on 2 October 1947. The Jewish Agency announced acceptance of 10 of the 11 unanimous recommendations of the UN partition plan and rejection of the minority report. Of the majority report (the Partition Plan areas), Silver vacillated saying that he was prepared to "recommend to the Jewish people acceptance subject to further discussion of the constitutional and territorial provisions".) On 14 May 1948, the United Kingdom relinquished its mandate over Palestine and the State of Israel was proclaimed. The following day, the Arab States invaded.

The General Assembly adopted Resolution 186 (S-2) on 14 May 1948. This affirmed its support for the efforts of the Security Council to secure a truce in Palestine, and it decided to appoint a UN Mediator. Bernadotte was appointed was sent to Palestine. On 22 May 1948, the Security Council adopted Resolution 49 (1948), calling for an abstention from any hostile military action in Palestine. The resolution also called upon the parties to facilitate the task of the UN Mediator. On 22 May 1948, Thomas C. Wasson, the US Consul and a member of the UN Truce Commission, was assassinated in Jerusalem.

On 29 May 1948, UN Security Council Resolution 50 (1948), called for a cessation of hostilities in Palestine and decided that the truce should be supervised by the Bernadotte with the assistance of a group of military observers. The first group of military observers, which later became known as UNTSO, arrived in the region in June 1948, when the Security Council threatened Chapter VII intervention. To enforce the first of two truces, lasting four weeks, the United Nations then established an observer formation, with members drawn from Belgium, France, and the United States. On 6 July the UN observers had their first casualty with the death of the French Observer Commandant Rene de Labarriere, who was wounded near the Afoula area and later died in the Jewish Hospital at Afoula. He was wounded while investigating an alleged violation of the truce provisions by Jewish forces.

The mediator was instructed on 29 May 1948 to create a one-month truce in Palestine. The mediator concept was teamed with the Truce Commission for supervisory over-watch of the Truce Plan. The month-long truce went into effect on 11 June 1948. On the same day, the first group of 36 observers arrived via Cairo, Egypt, and continued to arrive for the next three days. The first truce did not last long due to widespread violence. As a result, the observers were withdrawn on 9 July 1948. The second truce, indefinite in length, was called by the United Nations Security Council on 15 July 1948. This declaration was to be put into effect on 18 July 1948. It was from Security Council Resolution 54 that the mediator was instructed to supervise the observance of the truce and to establish procedures for examining alleged breaches of the truce since 11 June 1948, and authorized the mediator to deal with breaches so far as it was within the capacity of the mediator to do so by appropriate local action. The Security Council Resolution 54 also requested the mediator to keep the Security Council informed concerning the operation of the truce and, where necessary, to take appropriate action. During the autumn of 1948, UNTSO was re-established with an increase in size to supervise the Second Truce. The first group of observers to serve in Palestine under the UN Mediator, Bernadotte, arrived in Rhodes on 20 July. It included 41 Americans and about 25 Belgians and were deployed on 21 July 1948. The initial group was quickly expanded to 93 in total because of the large area that had to be covered. As the number of personnel grew, the United Nations Secretariat (of Personnel) supported the creation of the United Nations Truce Supervision Organization (UNTSO), the same organization UN military observers are assigned to today. Initially, the command was headed by a Chief-of-Staff (a general officer from one of the participating countries) in accordance with the personal direction of the mediator (a civilian).

On 17 September 1948, UN Mediator Count Folke Bernadotte, and Colonel André Serot, while on an official tour of duty to Jerusalem, were murdered "in cold blood... in the Katamon quarter of Jerusalem by Jewish assailants." After the assassination, the talks between the warring parties began under the supervision of Acting Mediator Ralph Bunche. Bunche, Chief of the UN Mission in Palestine, in his letter to the Israeli Foreign Minister Moshe Shertok wrote that the incident was "an outrage against the international community and an unspeakable violation of elementary morality. His [Bernadotte's] safety, therefore, and that of his Lieutenants under the ordinary rules of law and order was a responsibility of the Provisional government of Israel whose armed forces and representatives control and administer the area. The act constitutes a breach of the truce of the utmost gravity for which the Provisional Government of Israel must assume full responsibility." The Provisional Government of Israel did not submit the report to the Security Council or to the Acting Mediator regarding the progress of the investigation into the assassination of Count Bernadotte.

The General Armistice Agreements (GAAs) came out of the mediator-chaired talks. On 11 August 1949, it was decided by the Security Council that the mediator's function had been completed and that the role in observing the ceasefire should be passed to the Chief of Staff of the UNTSO. In 1949, UNTSO military observers remained to supervise the 1949 Armistice Agreements between Israel and its Arab neighbours, which were for many years the main basis of the uneasy truce in the whole area. UNTSO's activities have been and still are spread over territory within five States, and therefore it has relations with five host countries – Egypt, Israel, Jordan, Lebanon and Syrian Arab Republic. Since then, UNTSO has also supervised the General Armistice Agreements of 1949 and the observation of the ceasefire in the Suez Canal area following the Suez Crisis of 1956, and the Golan Heights following the Six-Day War of June 1967 and the Yom Kippur War of 1973.

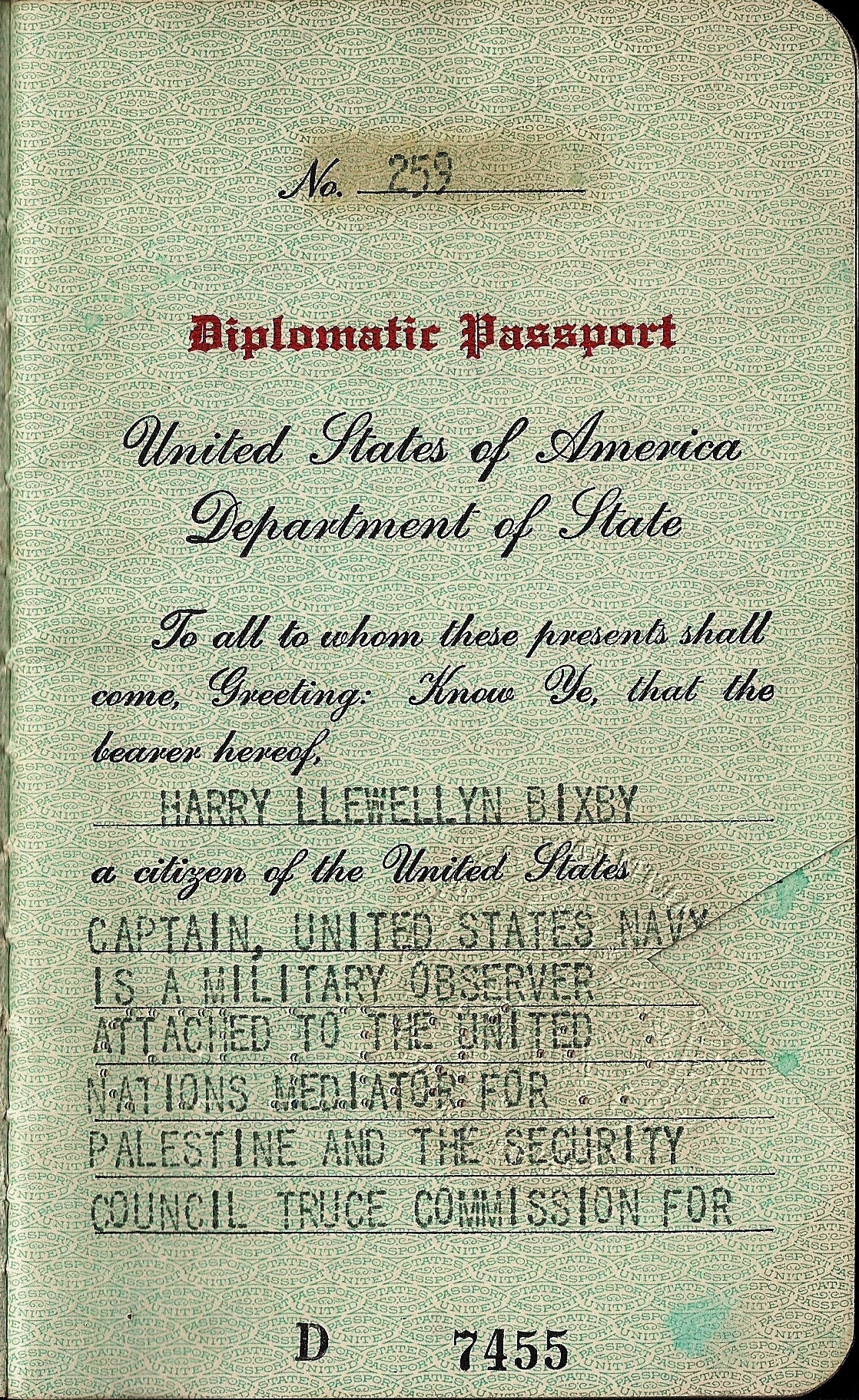
1949 United Nations mediator issued US diplomatic passport. Holder was a navy captain, military observer attached to the security council truce commission for Palestine.

=== 1949 to 1956 ===
The period from August 1949 to June 1956 was initially chaotic but quickly settled into a routine of complaints on the Jordanian, Egyptian, Syrian and Lebanese fronts. It was initially possible for the UN personnel to deal with complaints of violations of the "truce" at the local commander level. As time progressed there arose a culture of claim and counter claim by the participating parties and regardless of the work and intent of UNTSO the intensity of the violent incidents increased. The GAAs had been hastily prepared in anticipation of an early peace along the lines of the 1947 Partition Plan and the primary concern was an end to the bloodshed at the earliest opportunity. As a result, the armistice lines had laid out temporary boundaries without thought to existing village boundaries or water rights. The armistice agreements were of a purely military character, intended to provide a transitional stage between the truce and a final peace. They constituted, in effect, non-aggression agreements of unlimited duration, but they contained in themselves no provision for establishing normal relations between the neighbouring countries. The armistice lines did not follow the fighting lines in all cases especially the Syrian Armistice line. In the case of the Egyptian Armistice line Israel forces carried on with a push south arriving at Umm Rashrash (Eilat) in March after the Egyptian-Israel GAA of 24 February 1949. This caused friction on setting the "truce lines". The contribution toward the foundation of a peaceful existence by the Mixed Armistice Commissions (MACs) was limited by the sanctions that the MACs were able to apply (a formal condemnation by the Security Council). For approximately 18 years (from 1949 until after the 1967 war), lack of harmony within the MACs was typical of the relationship existing between the countries. With the exception of the Israeli-Lebanon MAC, strife and discord became common.

The MACs were very different from one another, bringing about four unique peacekeeping missions under the head of the UNTSO. Disputes on the Israel/Syria Mixed Armistice Commission (ISMAC) centred on the most precious Middle Eastern commodity: water and sovereignty of the DMZ. Contentious issues in the HKJIMAC principally concerned the divided city of Jerusalem, the Israeli Mount Scopus enclave, the Latrun salient (sovereignty of the DMZ), Arab infiltration across the armistice demarcation line and large scale Israeli military incursions into Jordanian territory. The troubles were followed by infiltration from displaced Arabs, followed by raids of reprisal and intimidation by the Israelis, which heightened tensions around the borders. The infiltration by Palestinians initially consisted of unarmed groups crossing to regain possessions, harvest their crops or visit relatives, but later infiltrations included armed individuals and then later developed into small retaliatory raids.

Israeli infiltration into Jordanian territory at this time included retaliatory raids by military units at Qibya and Nahhalin. Israel's frustration with the UN and the other parties led to their withdrawal from ISMAC in 1951 and HKJIMAC in 1954. The functioning of the Israel-Lebanon MAC remained smooth due to the more relaxed attitude of the Israeli patrols towards returnees and infiltrators. Disputes with Egypt, who banned Israel-bound shipping from the Suez Canal and blockaded the Gulf of Aqaba, pertained to the al-Auja DMZ. By 1955, Egypt's sponsorship of Palestinian fedayeen (self-sacrificer) raids caused Israel to cease attending the Egyptian MAC and to step up raids into the Gaza Strip and Sinai, which resulted in Egypt arming the fedayeen. From 21 September 1955, the Egypt/Israel demilitarized zone was occupied by Israel armed forces. In response, Secretary-General Dag Hammarskjöld and the Chief of Staff UNTSO attempted to secure the implementation of a plan for withdrawal of Israeli armed forces and the removal of Egyptian forces from prohibited positions. Articles VII and VIII of the Egypt-Israel GAA established a Demilitarized Zone (DMZ) centred on El-Auja and forbade the presence of armed forces. It also prohibited Egypt from maintaining positions in an adjoining area west of the demilitarized zone, and limited the arms and troops in the Defensive Areas on both sides of the Line. Both Egypt and Israel had indicated to the Secretary-General their willingness to comply fully with these two articles, within the framework of a return to full compliance with the Armistice Agreement. The Israeli Government gave assurances of its complete acceptance in principle of the plan. The agreed withdrawal, however, never took place. The 1956 invasion of Egypt by British, French and Israeli forces, followed Egypt's decision on 26 July 1956 to nationalize the Suez Canal.

=== Suez Crisis to Six Day War ===
After the 1956 War (often referred to as the Suez Crisis), UNTSO greatly assisted the establishment of the United Nations Emergency Force (UNEF); in large measure the result of diplomatic efforts of the UN Secretary-General Dag Hammarskjöld and a proposal from Canadian minister of external affairs Lester Pearson, by providing a group of trained military personnel for peacekeeping and emergency operations to UNEF.

Israel, after the 1956 war, subsequently ceased all cooperation/participation in its Israeli-Egyptian MAC. On 8 November, the Israeli representative informed the Secretary-General that his Government would withdraw its forces from Egypt immediately after the conclusion of satisfactory arrangements with the United Nations in connection with the Emergency International Force. (Note: Norman G. Finkelstein alludes to Brian Urquhart's memoir, A Life in Peace and War (ISBN 0-06-015840-9), where Urquhart, describing the aftermath of the 1956 Suez Crisis, recalls how Israel refused to allow the UNEF to be stationed on the Israeli side of the line, and labels the Israeli rejection as a "grave weakness for a peacekeeping force.") As a result, according to the United Nations, arrangements were made through which, "without any change of the legal structure or status of the United Nations Truce Supervision Organization, the functions of UNTSO in the Gaza area were placed under the operational control of UNEF". A close co-operation between UNTSO and UNEF was to be maintained.

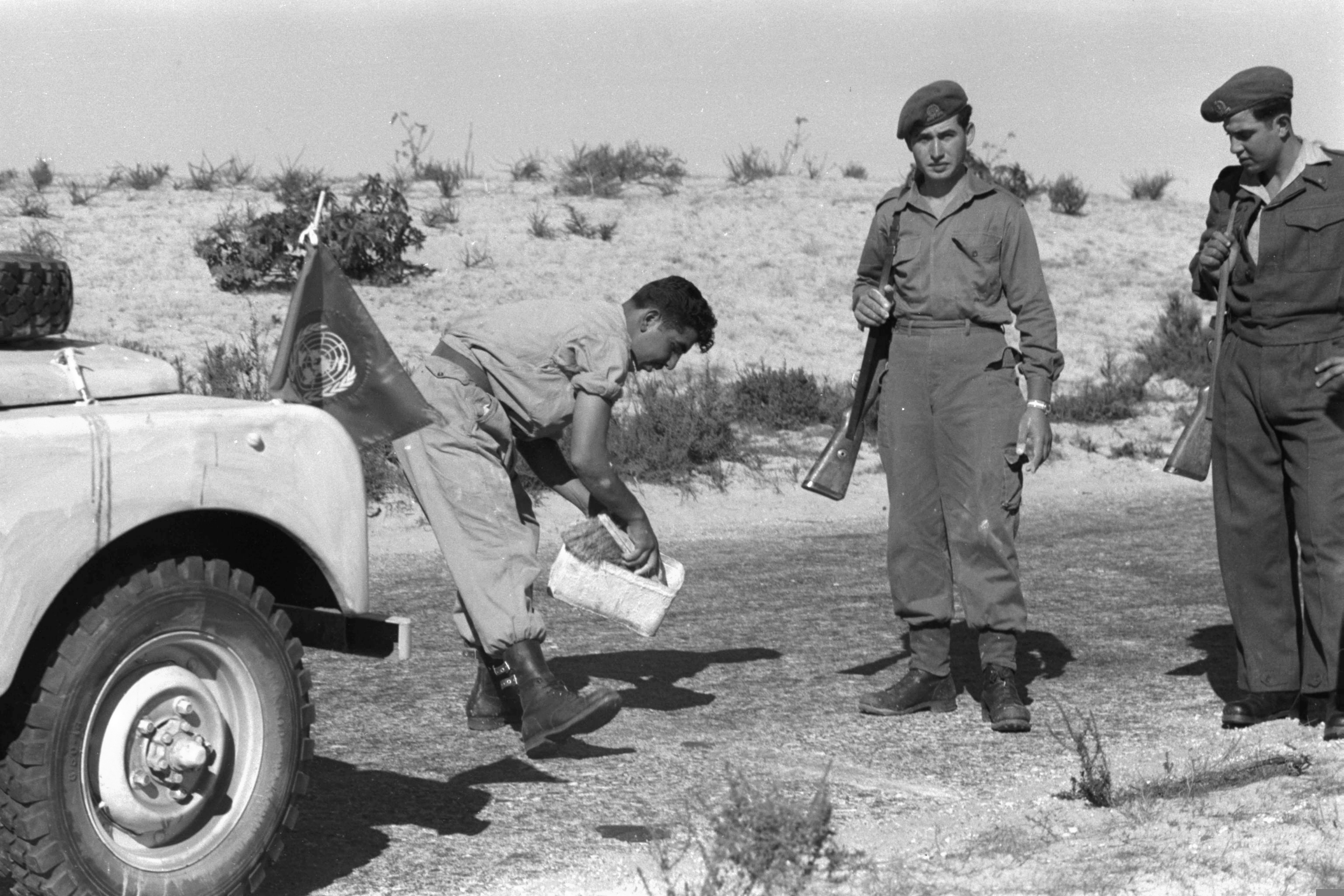
Israeli and UN personnel during the withdrawal from the Sinai in 1957

The General Assembly, on 19 January 1957, noted "with regret and concern the failure of Israel to withdraw from Egyptian territory". Later, on 2 February 1957, the council deplored the" non-compliance of Israel with regard to completion of its withdrawal and called upon Israel to complete its withdrawal without delay". On 6 March 1957, General Burns was able to report to the Secretary-General of the UN that the "United Nations Emergency Force troops are now in position in all camps and centres of population in Gaza Strip". The staged withdrawal of Israeli forces from the Gaza Strip, with the exception of an Israel troop unit at Rafah camp, at 0400 GMT on 7 March 1957 was carried out according to plan and without incidents. By agreement, that last Israel element was withdrawn by 1600 GMT on 8 March and a full Israeli withdrawal from the Sharm al Shaikh area was effected at the same time. In the following years, the Israel-Egypt MAC remained inactive, with only Egyptians and UN personnel taking part.

In this period, the Lebanese sector was relatively calm compared to subsequent events in that area. The Israel-Lebanon MAC met regularly and had developed a routine for handling incidents that occurred. In the Jordanian and Syrian sectors were the scene of frequent and often serious incidents and both the Israel-Jordan and the Israel-Syria MAC's were quite active in pursuance of their mandate in responding to issues, with several incidents evolving regarding land use around Jerusalem and in the Hula area, and the movement of supply convoys to the Israeli enclave at Mount Scopus. During one of these incidents around Mount Scopus, a military observer, Canadian Lieutenant Colonel George Flint, was killed.

In response to Israeli activities in the DMZ between the armistice demarcation lines in the Government House area in Jerusalem, Jordan complained to UN. This resulted in the Security Council adopting Resolution 127 (1958) on 22 January 1958, noting that the status of the zone is affected by the provisions of the Israel-Jordan GAAs and that neither Israel nor Jordan enjoys sovereignty over any part of the zone and directing the Chief of Staff of UNTSO in Palestine to regulate activities in the zone.

In June 1958, UNTSO personnel were used to quickly raise the United Nations Observation Group in Lebanon, a short lived mission that was sent to Lebanon over the period June – December 1958 during the 1958 Lebanon crisis.

On 17 March 1961, the Israelis undertook a dress rehearsal for a military parade in the Israeli-occupied part of the Jerusalem, in which heavy military armaments were displayed. In response, Jordan complained to the MAC. On 20 March 1961, the Mixed Armistice Commission decided that "this act by Israel is a breach of the General Armistice Agreement". The MAC also condemned the parade and called upon the Israeli authorities to take the strongest measures to prevent a recurrence of such a breach of the GAA and to refrain in the future from bringing to Jerusalem any equipment that was in excess of that allowed for under the terms of the GAA. The Israeli authorities still contemplated holding the full dress military parade on 20 April 1961 in the Israeli-occupied part of Jerusalem. The Security Council, on 11 April 1961, adopted Resolution 162 (1961); this endorsed the 20 March 1961 decision of the MAC; relating to the military parade contemplated for 20 April 1961 in the Israel-occupied part of Jerusalem, and urged Israel to comply with the decision of the MAC made on 20 March 1961.

The Israel-Syria Armistice Agreement provided for a demilitarized zone (DMZ) in the Hula Lake area at the foot of the Golan Heights, a zone which encompassed the area of Palestine as defined in the League of Nations Mandate occupied by Syrian forces at the time of the armistice. Civilian construction and land use in the DMZ caused numerous incidents around this time due to disputes over land ownership even though UNTSO was tasked with attempting to regulate activities leading to such disputes in the zone. After heavy fighting broke out between Israel and Syria in the DMZ, the Security Council in Resolutions 92 (1951) and 93 (1951) of 8 and 18 May 1951 called upon the parties to cease fighting and endorsed the request of the Chief of Staff of UNTSO that the Israeli company involved be instructed to cease all operations in the DMZ until such time as an agreement is arranged through the Chairman of the MAC for continuing its project. In Resolution 111 (1956) of 19 January 1956, the Security Council dealt with the confrontation which had escalated following interference by the Syrian authorities with legitimate Israeli activities on Lake Tiberias. It condemned as "in no way justified" the Israeli action taken in response to that interference in the form of an attack by Israeli regular army forces against Syrian regular army forces on Syrian territory. It also noted that in violation of the provisions of the General Armistice Agreement concerning the DMZ, the Zone had been crossed by the Israeli forces that entered Syria.

Following a prolonged military confrontation between the parties, the Security Council was again involved in the Israel – Syria situation in 1962 in the light of a report by the Chief of Staff of UNTSO on the military activities in the Lake Tiberias area and in the DMZ. The council in Resolution 171 (1962) of 9 April 1962 noted with satisfaction that a cease fire had been achieved. It deplored the hostile exchanges which had taken place and called upon the governments concerned to comply with the General Armistice Agreement. It determined that an Israeli attack on 16–17 March had been a flagrant violation of the previous resolution (111), and called on Israel scrupulously to refrain from such action in the future. It also called upon both parties to abide scrupulously by the cease fire arranged by the Chief of Staff of UNTSO, and called specifically for strict observance of the article of the GAA which provides for the exclusion of armed forces from the demilitarized zone, and of the annex to the GAA which sets limits on forces in the defensive area.

On 7 June 1967, during the Six Day War, Comdt Thomas Wickham of the Irish Defense Forces was shot dead in Syria.

=== Six Day War to Yom Kippur War (1967 to 1973) ===
The period between the Six-Day War of June 1967 and the Yom Kippur War of October 1973, UNTSO performed a vital function of helping to establish and supervise ceasefire agreements which included new boundaries between the countries. Even though there was no change to UNTSO's mission, the execution of its original mission became nearly impossible with the advent of the newly drawn ceasefire lines between Israel and Egypt-Jordan-Syria respectively.

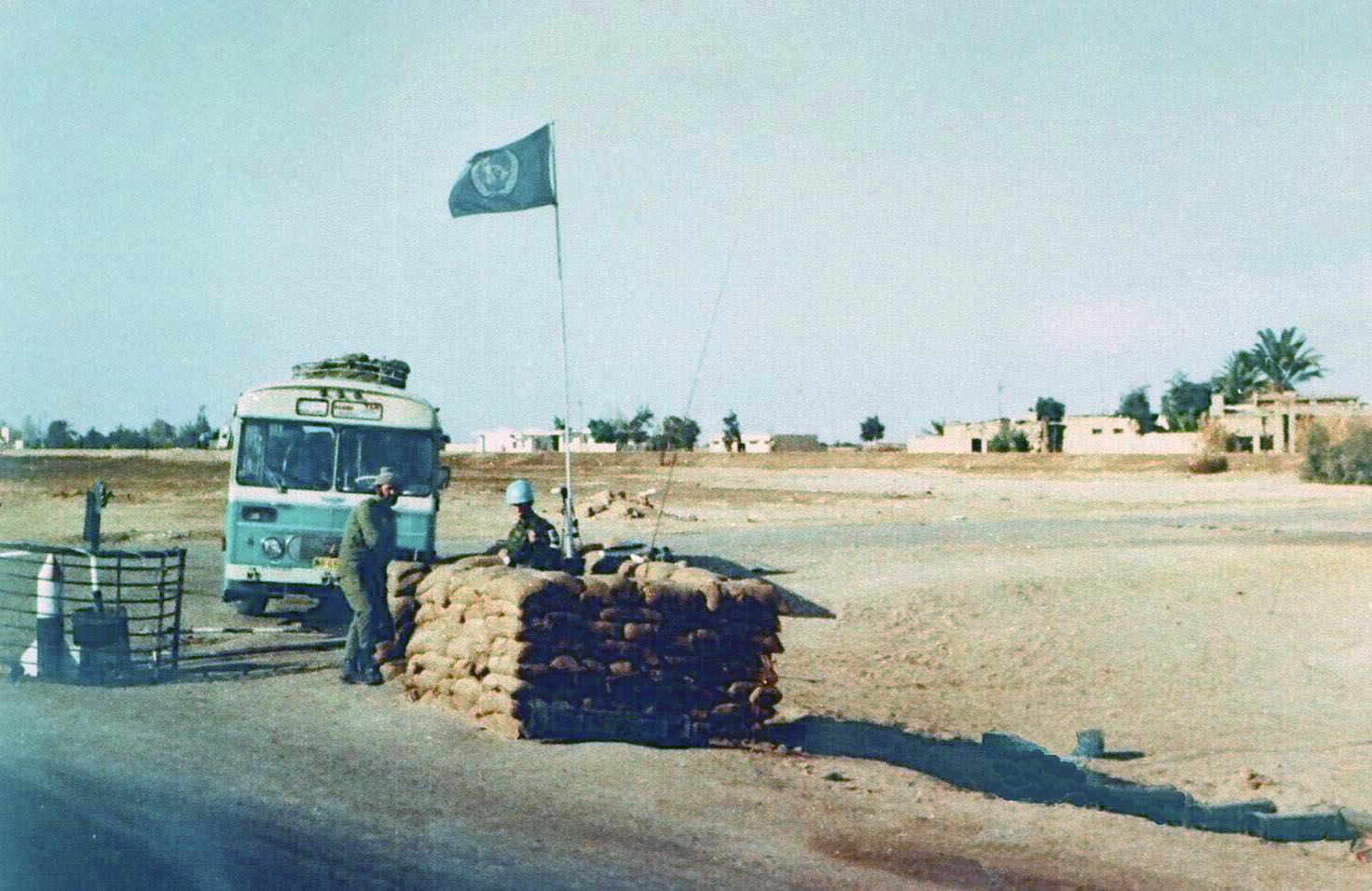
A UN position in the aftermath of the Yom Kippur war

Additionally, UNTSO did not have the MACs to supervise since Israel abrogated its initial agreement to the Armistice as conceived. Realizing the changing political situation, the UN Security Council added some new tasks to the UNTSO Charter on the first few months following the 1967 ceasefire. Specifically, in the Egypt-Israel and Israel-Syria fronts, UNTSO established observation posts (OPs): a total of 15 were established along the Suez, while 16 were established in the Golan Heights. These posts remained in effect until the Yom Kippur War of October 1973. The UN offices established in Amman and Gaza (before the 1967 War) were allowed to continue to function as Liaison Offices, even though the MAC concept had become defunct.

At the urging of the Lebanese government, UNTSO created an observation operation along the Lebanese border (1949 Armistice Demarcation line) in the spring of 1972. Due to the Palestinian activity in South Lebanon and the potential Israeli reprisal against their encampments, UNTSO felt the potential for further conflict warranted the additional OPs. At this time, posts were established at El Khiam, Maroun Er Ras, and at Naquora.

=== Yom Kippur to the Israel–Lebanon War ===
As a result of the Yom Kippur War, the positions occupied by the UN military observers in the Middle East were drastically affected. A total of eight OPs were abandoned at this time; however, most OPs are still located in the same place today. In the Egyptian-Israeli sector, UNTSO personnel were structured around the Observer "Group" concept and placed under the UN Peace-Keeping Forces that occupied the region. Observer Group Sinai was formed and attached to the Second United Nations Emergency Force (UNEF II). The Charter for UNEF II expired on 24 July 1979 which only left UNTSO's presence. The observers were then restructured on new OPs which were located on vantage points throughout the Sinai peninsula. For the Sinai Group, their main office was located in Cairo (in 1993 it was moved to Ismailia, closer to the OPs). On the Israeli-Syria border, UNTSO's ceasefire observation and supervision mission continued but with a readjusted ceasefire line. Observer Groups Damascus and Golan (Syrian sector) were established as a result of the United Nations Disengagement Observer Force (UNDOF).

Shortly after the 1973 war, U.S. participation in UNTSO expanded to twenty-five officers. The U.S. Marine Corps portion was six. Approximately the same period, the Soviets made a surprise move and announced their support of UNTSO and likewise wanted to provide observers. To keep a balanced presence between the east–west Superpowers—the Soviet participation was set at the same level as the United States (which was twenty-five each at that time). Subsequent to the 1973 agreement, the number of observers for all countries participating increased. As a result, the number of personnel to be provided by Soviet Union and the United States was re-established at thirty-six each. Since U.S. personnel were not allowed in Lebanon (a limitation set forth by U.S. Secretary of Defence Frank Carlucci, due to the threat to U.S. personnel), at this time there was a move to reduce U.S. participation to UNTSO. As a corollary, this also required a reduction in the numbers of Soviet observers. This reduction was delayed due to a lengthy diplomatic process. (Note: By 31 December 2004, there were three US officers assigned to UNTSO as military observers.)

=== After the Lebanon War ===
The Israeli-Lebanese conflict commenced in the late 1970s, ending the relative stability of the demarcation line along that front. It provided the latest major change to UNTSO's structure. After the outbreak of the Civil War in Lebanon and the Israeli invasion of Southern Lebanon (March 1978), the United Nations established the United Nations Interim Force in Lebanon (UNIFIL). UNTSO's observers were thus reorganized into Observer Group Lebanon (OGL) to assist UNIFIL. September 1982 saw a low point for UNTSO with the deaths of four of its unarmed officer observers—one Finn, one Irishman, and two Americans—in a landmine explosion just outside Beirut. As the Israelis advanced north, the position of Observer Group Lebanon was adjusted. In the early 1980s, the headquarters of the Israel-Lebanon Mixed Armistice Commission (ILMAC) which was already located in Beirut, was also tasked with being the United Nations Liaison Office Beirut (UNLOB). Under the close supervision of UNTSO's Chief-of-Staff, UNLOB/ILMAC functioned as a dual purpose headquarters/ liaison office for both UNTSO and UNIFIL.

With the establishment of the non-UN Multinational Force and Observers mission in the Sinai in 1981, UNTSO's Observer Group Sinai was retained to maintain a UN presence in the area.

Four unarmed UN peacekeepers from Austria, China, Finland and Canada were killed during an Israeli air strike on 25 July 2006, which struck a UN OP at Khiam.

== Headquarters ==
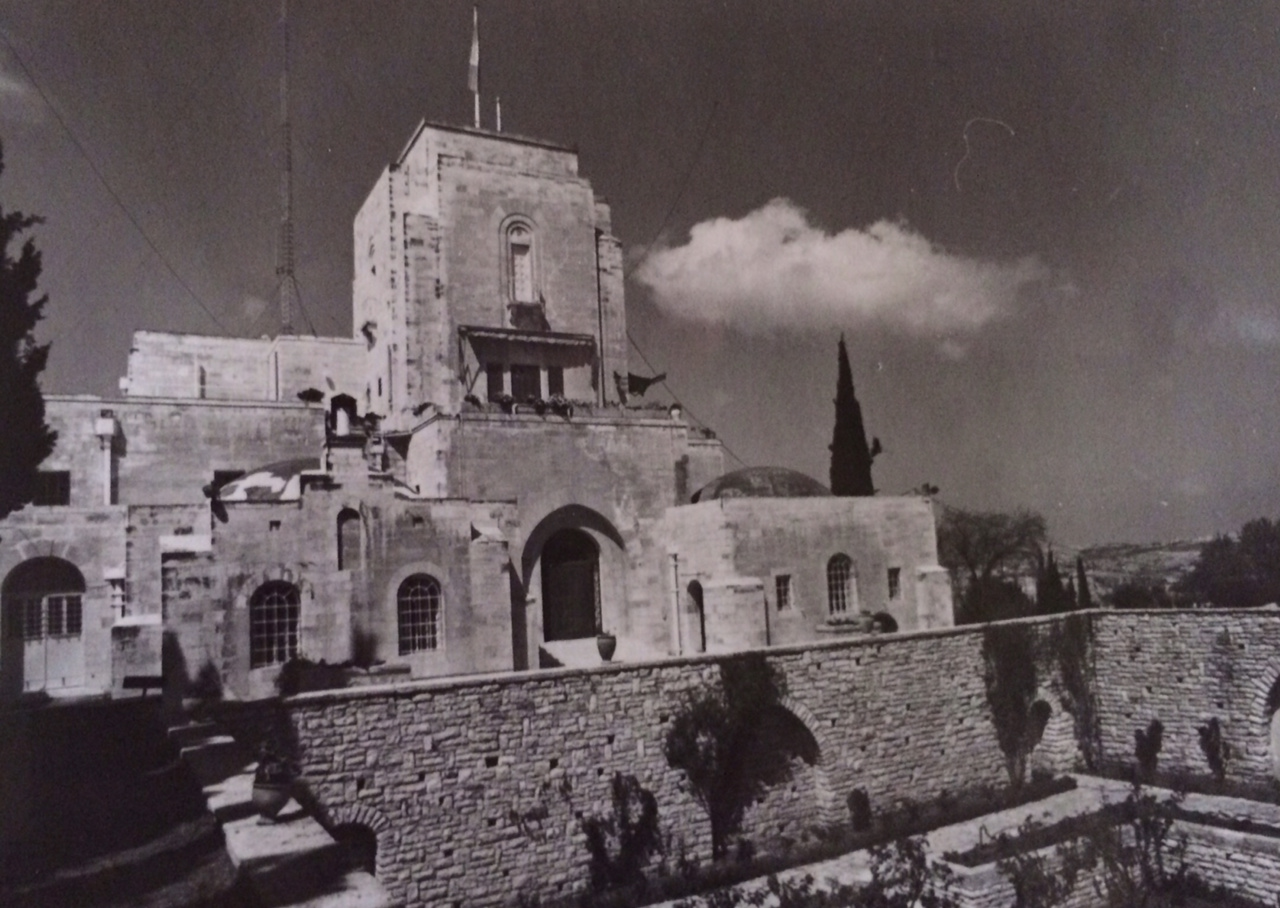
UNTSO headquarters, Jerusalem, south view, 1986

Cairo was the initial headquarters of UNTSO. This was moved, shortly after its creation, to Haifa (a British enclave in this time), in late June 1948. The Haifa HQ was evacuated on 9 July due to renewed fighting. With the return of UN peacekeeping forces to Israel on 21 July 1948, UNTSO headquarters was moved again on 7 October 1948 for the third and final time to the former British High Commissioner's headquarters in Jerusalem.

UNTSO also has offices in Beirut, Ismailia and Damascus.

== Contributing countries ==
Military personnel allocated to UNTSO have come from many nations over the course of the mission's history. The United States, Belgium and France provided the initial groups of observers until 1953, but as the Cold War developed the number of personnel committed by the US and France was reduced. From 1953, other nations began contributing observers. Notably, Sweden has provided the most number of chiefs of staff. The Soviet Union first deployed personnel after the 1973 Arab–Israeli war. In 2020, the following nations contributed personnel: Argentina, Australia, Austria, Bhutan, Belgium, Canada, Chile, the People's Republic of China, Denmark, Estonia, Finland, Fiji, Gambia, Ireland, India, Nepal, the Netherlands, New Zealand, Norway, Poland, Russia (formerly the Soviet Union), Serbia, Slovenia, Slovakia, Sweden, Switzerland and the United States. Britain is the only permanent member of the Security Council that does not currently provide personnel to the mission.

== Today ==
UNTSO personnel have also been available at short notice to form the nucleus of other peacekeeping operations. The availability of UNTSO's military observers for almost immediate deployment after the Security Council had acted to create a new operation has been an enormous contributory factor to the success of those operations.

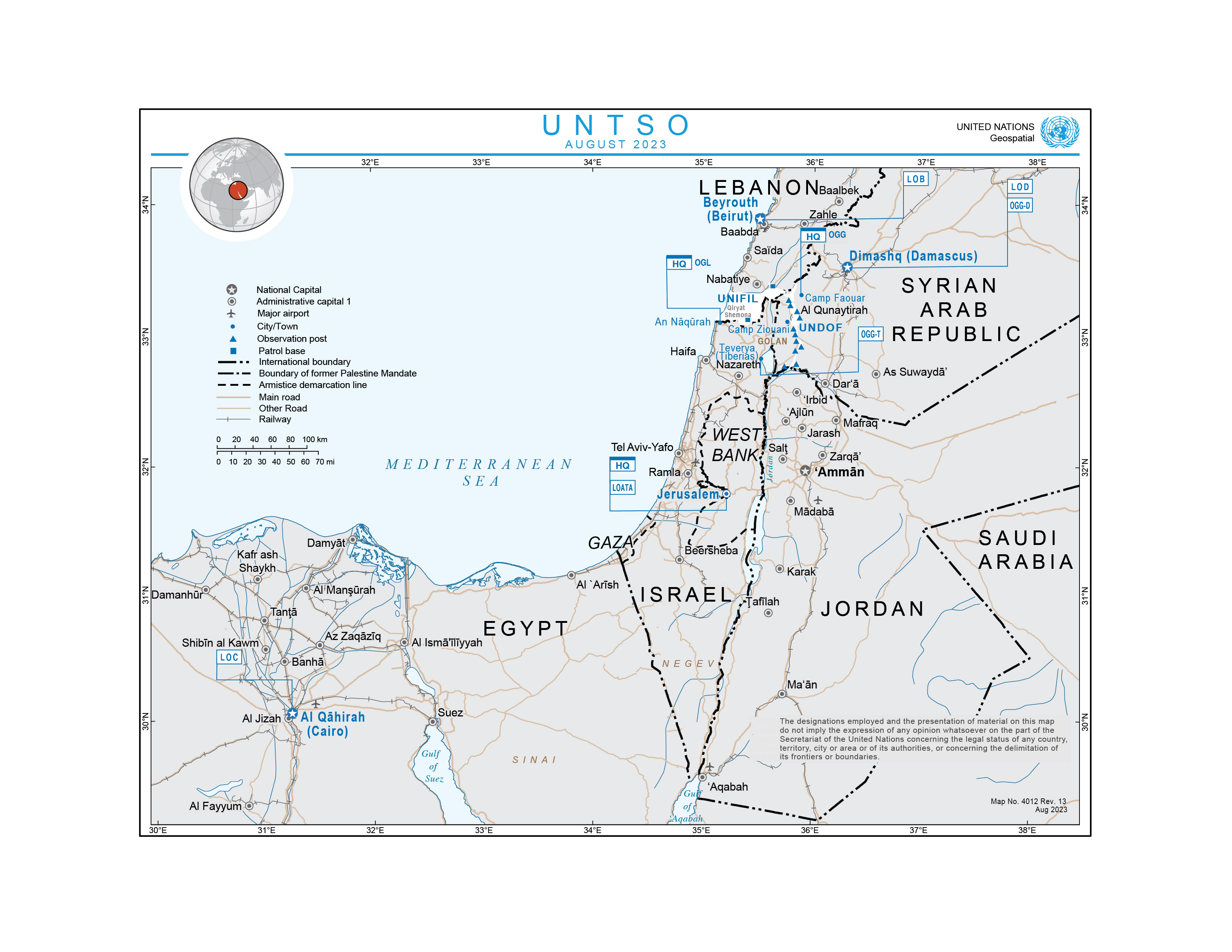
UNTSO deployment as of August 2023

According to the United Nations, "the military observers are unarmed and they carry out their jobs by observing and reporting violations of the agreements of ceasefire, disengagement etc. that are relevant to their area of operations. All military observers are seasoned officers of the rank of captain or major coming from all branches of service in their respective countries armed forces. The military observers work in multi-national teams, so that any observations will always be confirmed by at least two observers from different nations, as a measure to ensure impartiality".

UNTSO currently provides military observers to three different UN missions in the area: Observer Group Lebanon (OGL), supporting UNIFIL in Southern Lebanon; Observer Group Golan (OGG), supporting UNDOF in the Golan Heights; and Observer Group Egypt (OGE) in the Sinai Peninsula.

OGG, who has its headquarters co-located with UNDOF HQ in Camp Faouar in Syria, is split into two outstations; OGG-D (Observer Group Golan – Damascus) based in Damascus, Syria and OGG-T (Observer Group Golan – Tiberias) based in Tiberias, Israel. Each outstation maintains "a number of observation posts on each side of the Area of Separation (AOS) that was put in place as part of the 1974 Disengagement Agreement between Syria and Israel following the 1973 Yom Kippur War. The military observers carry-out fortnightly inspections inside the Area of Limitations (AOL) to verify, that both sides adhere to the limitations on troop levels and military equipment within 10, 20 and 25 km zones from the AOS as prescribed by the 1974 Disengagement Agreement".

OGL HQ are co-located with UNIFIL HQ in Naqoura, Southern Lebanon. OGL occupies several patrol bases along the "Blue Line" – a demarcation line between Israel and Lebanon.

OGE is based in Ismalia by the Suez Canal in Egypt. OGE conducts short and long-range patrols in the Sinai Peninsula.

== International Day of United Nations Peacekeepers ==
The United Nations has designated 29 May as the "International Day of United Nations Peacekeepers." On that day in 2008 the sixtieth anniversary of the first United Nations Peacekeeping Forces being deployed was celebrated. In a press release, the UN announced:

Sixty years ago on that date, the United Nations Security Council established the first peacekeeping operation, the United Nations Truce Supervision Organization (UNTSO), based in the Middle East. In 2001, the General Assembly proclaimed 29 May as the International Day of United Nations Peacekeepers to pay tribute to the men and women who serve in United Nations peacekeeping operations and honour the memory of those who have lost their lives in the cause of peace.

== Commanders (Chief of Staff) ==
No.	Name (born–died)	Term of office			Country	Ref.
No.	Name (born–died)	Took office	Left office	Time in office	Country	Ref.
1	Colonel; Thord Bonde	May 1948	July 1948	2 months	Sweden	
2	Major General; Åge Lundström	July 1948	September 1948	2 months	Sweden	
3	Lieutenant General; William E. Riley	September 1948	June 1953	4 years, 9 months	United States	
4	Major General; Vagn Bennike	June 1953	September 1954	1 year, 3 months	Denmark	
5	Lieutenant-General; E. L. M. Burns	August 1954	November 1956	2 years, 2 months	Canada	
–	Colonel; Byron V. Leary acting	November 1956	March 1958	1 year, 4 months	United States	
6	Lieutenant General; Carl von Horn	March 1958	July 1960	2 years, 4 months	Sweden	
–	Colonel; R.W. Rickert acting	July 1960	December 1960	5 months	United States	
6	Lieutenant General; Carl von Horn	January 1961	May 1963	2 years, 4 months	Sweden	
7	Lieutenant General; Odd Bull	May 1963	July 1970	7 years, 2 months	Norway	
8	Lieutenant General; Ensio Siilasvuo	July 1970	October 1973	3 years, 3 months	Finland	
–	Colonel; Richard Bunworth acting	October 1973	March 1974	5 months	Ireland	
9	Major General; Bengt Liljestrand	March 1974	August 1975	1 year, 5 months	Sweden	
–	Colonel; Keith Howard acting	September 1975	December 1975	4 months	Australia	
10	Major General; Emmanuel Erskine	January 1976	March 1978	2 years, 2 months	Ghana	
–	Lieutenant General; William O'Callaghan acting	April 1978	June 1979	1 year, 2 months	Ireland	
–	Colonel; Olof Forsgren acting	June 1979	January 1980	7 months	Sweden	
11	Major General; Erkki R. Kaira	February 1980	February 1981	1 year	Finland	
(10)	Major General; Emmanuel Erskine	February 1981	May 1986	5 years, 3 months	Ghana	
11	Lieutenant General; William O'Callaghan	May 1986	June 1987	1 year, 1 month	Ireland	
12	Lieutenant General; Martin O. Vadset	June 1987	October 1990	3 years, 4 months	Norway	
13	Major General; Hans Christensen	October 1990	October 1992	2 years	Finland	
14	Major General; Krisna Thapa	October 1992	December 1993	1 year, 2 months	Nepal	
–	Colonel; John Fisher acting	December 1993	April 1994	4 months	New Zealand	
–	Colonel; Luc Bujold acting	April 1994	June 1995	1 year, 2 months	Canada	
–	Colonel; Jaakko Oksanen acting	June 1995	September 1995	3 months	Finland	
15	Major General; Rufus Kupolati	October 1995	March 1998	2 years, 5 months	Nigeria	
16	Major General; Tim Ford	April 1998	March 2000	1 year, 11 months	Australia	
17	Major General; Franco Ganguzza	April 2000	March 2002	1 year, 11 months	Italy	
18	Major General; Carl Dodd	March 2002	September 2004	2 years, 6 months	Ireland	
19	Major General; Clive Lilley	November 2004	November 2006	2 years	New Zealand	
20	Major General; Ian Gordon	November 2006	February 2008	1 year, 3 months	Australia	
21	Major General; Robert Mood	February 2008	April 2011	3 years, 2 months	Norway	
22	Major General; Juha Kilpiä	May 2011	June 2013	2 years, 1 month	Finland	
23	Major General; Michael Finn	July 2013	31 July 2015	2 years	Ireland	
24	Major General; Dave Gawn	1 September 2015	June 2017	1 year, 9 months	New Zealand	
25	Major General; Kristin Lund	6 October 2017	October 2019	1 year, 11 months	Norway	
26	Major General; Patrick Gauchat	October 2021	Incumbent	4 years, 9 months	Switzerland	

== Bibliography ==
- Brogan, Patrick (1990). The Fighting Never Stopped: A Comprehensive Guide to World Conflict Since 1945. New York: Vintage Books. ISBN 0-679-72033-2.
- Claytor, William D. (1990). "United Nations Truce Supervision Organization: History And U.S. Marine Involvement". Marine Corps University Command and Staff College – via Global Security.org.
- Congress of the United States (1967). "Report of the Special Study Mission to the Near East: Annex F – The Mixed Armistice Commissions". Sixteenth Annual Report of the Activities of the Joint Committee on Defense Production. Washington: U.S. Government Printing Office.
- Finkelstein, Norman G. (2003). Image and Reality of the Israel-Palestine Conflict (2nd ed.). New York: Verso. ISBN 1-85984-442-1.
- Hornby, Robert (2010). Prelude to Suez. Amberley. ISBN 978-1-84868-864-3.
- Hutchison, E.H. (1958). Violent Truce: A Military Observer Looks at the Arab–Israeli Conflict 1951–1955. New York: Devin-Adair Co. OCLC 180155159.
- Mesquita, Ana Guedes; White, Nigel D. (2015). "United Nations Observation Group in Lebanon (UNOGIL)". In Koops, Joachim; MacQueen, Norrie; Tardy, Thierry; Williams, Paul D. (eds.). Oxford Handbook of United Nations Peacekeeping Operations. Oxford, United Kingdom: Oxford University Press. pp. 153–159. ISBN 978-0-19-968604-9.
- Morris, Benny (2005). Israel's Border Wars, 1949–1956: Arab Infiltration, Israeli Retaliation, and the Countdown to the Suez War. Oxford: Clarendon Press. ISBN 978-0-19829262-3.
- Paik, Roger F. (1982). Nuclear Proliferation in the Middle East: Implications for the Superpowers. National Security Affairs Monograph Series 82-1. Fort Lesley J. McNair, Washington DC: National Defense University Press.
- Pappé, Ilan (2015). The Ethnic Cleansing of Palestine. Oxford: Oneworld. ISBN 978-1-85168-555-4.
- Theobald, Andrew (2015). "The United Nations Truce Supervision Organization (UNTSO)". In Koops, Joachim; MacQueen, Norrie; Tardy, Thierry; Williams, Paul D. (eds.). Oxford Handbook of United Nations Peacekeeping Operations. Oxford, United Kingdom: Oxford University Press. pp. 121–132. ISBN 978-0-19-968604-9.
