= United Nations Security Council Resolution 48 =

UN Security Council Resolution 48
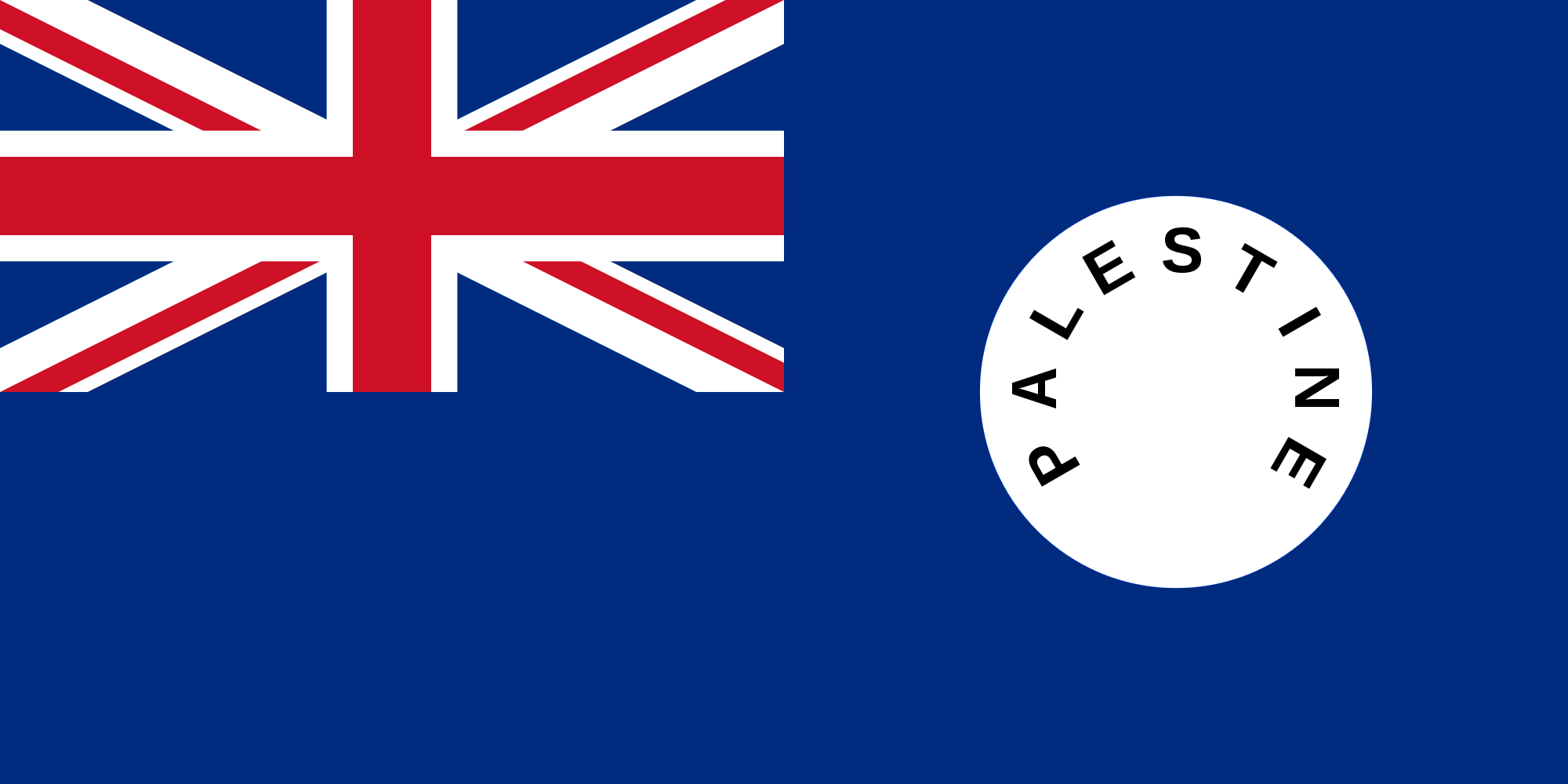
- Palestine flag
- Date: April 23 1948
- Meeting no.: 287
- Code: S/727 (Document)
- Subject: The Palestine Question
- Voting summary: 8 voted for; None voted against; 3 abstained
- Result: Adopted

Security Council composition
- Permanent members: China; France; Soviet Union; United Kingdom; United States
- Non-permanent members: Argentina; Belgium; Canada; Colombia; Syria; Ukrainian SSR

United Nations Security Council Resolution 48, adopted on April 23, 1948, called on all concerned parties to comply with United Nations Security Council Resolution 46 and to that end established a Truce Commission for Palestine to assist the Security Council in implementing the truce.

The resolution was approved by eight votes to none, with three abstentions from Colombia, the Ukrainian SSR and the Soviet Union.

== See also ==
- List of United Nations Security Council Resolutions 1 to 100 (1946–1953)
- United Nations Security Council Resolution 49
- United Nations Security Council Resolution 50
