= Carl Dodd (Irish Army officer) =

Irish military personnel

- Born: 1942 or 1943; Mallow, County Cork, Ireland
- Died: 18 September 2018; Newbridge, County Kildare, Ireland
- Military career
- Allegiance: Ireland
- Branch: Irish Army
- Service years: 1961–2004
- Rank: Major General
- Commands: United Nations Truce Supervision Organization; 3rd Infantry Battalion; Military College

Major General Carl Dodd (c. 1942 – 18 September 2018) was an Irish Army officer who served as Chief of Staff of the United Nations Truce Supervision Organization (UNTSO) from 2002 to 2004.

== Early life ==
Dodd was born in Mallow, County Cork, and moved from there in 1961 to join the Cadet School of the Military College in the Curragh, County Kildare.

== Military career ==
Throughout his career, Dodd held senior appointments as Commandant of the Military College, Commanding Officer of the 3rd Infantry Battalion and Director of Operations. In September 1999 he was promoted to major general and took up the appointment of Deputy Chief of Staff (Operations). In 2002, Kofi Annan, the UN Secretary-General, appointed Dodd as Chief of Staff of the United Nations Truce Supervision Organization (UNTSO) in Jerusalem.

== Personal life ==
Dodd was married and lived (when not posted abroad) in Newbridge, County Kildare. He died on 18 September 2018.
