= Juha Kilpiä =

Finnish UN official

Major General Juha Kilpiä (born 1953) is a Finnish general. He has served as the Military Representative of Finland to the European Union and NATO. He specializes in Middle East peacekeeping operations, particularly in the Levant.

== United Nations ==
On March 25th, 2011, United Nations Secretary-General Ban Ki-moon announced the appointment of Kilpiä as Head of Mission and Chief of Staff of the United Nations Truce Supervision Organization (UNTSO), an organization for peacekeeping in the Middle East. Kilpiä also served as Chief of Operations for the United Nations Interim Force in Lebanon (UNIFIL) and the United Nations Disengagement Observer Force (UNDOF).
