= William O'Callaghan (Irish Army officer) =

Irish Army officer (1921–2015)

- Liam Ó Ceallacháin
- Born: 3 July 1921; Buttevant, County Cork, Ireland
- Died: 26 December 2015 (aged 94)
- Military career
- Allegiance: Ireland
- Branch: Irish Army
- Service years: 1939–1987
- Rank: Lieutenant General
- Nickname: "The Bull"
- Commands: United Nations Truce Supervision Organization (1978–79, 1986–87); United Nations Interim Force in Lebanon (1981–86)
- Conflicts: Second World War; Lebanese Civil War: Multinational Force in Lebanon
- Awards: Distinguished Service Medal; Legion of Honour (France); National Order of the Cedar (Lebanon)

Lieutenant General William "Bull" O'Callaghan, BSD (Irish: Liam Ó Ceallacháin; 3 July 1921 – 26 December 2015) was an Irish Army officer.

== Early life ==
O'Callaghan was born in Buttevant, County Cork, and joined the Irish Defence Forces at age 17 in 1939.

== Military career ==
O'Callaghan graduated from the Military College at Curragh Camp, County Kildare. He is most notable for being the Force Commander of the United Nations Interim Force in Lebanon from 1981 to 1986; a neutral United Nations peacekeeping force during the Lebanese Civil War.

O'Callaghan, a native of County Cork, held two senior United Nations appointments in the Middle East between 1978 and 1987. He served as Force Commander of the United Nations Interim Force in Lebanon (UNIFIL) from February 1981 to May 1986. Additionally, he led the United Nations Truce Supervision Organization (UNTSO) from April 1978 to June 1979 and again from May 1986 to June 1987, where he commanded multinational troops across Syria, Lebanon, Israel, Egypt, and Jordan.

In an interview in April 1982 with United States magazine People, with UNIFIL having suffered 145 combat casualties in its previous 4 years, 35 of them fatalities, O'Callaghan said: "Peacekeeping is not about firing shots. It's about not firing and stopping those who are. We must look for trouble at the 4 points of the compass, and then we look behind our backs."

== Legacy ==
Irish cadets in training compete for an award named in his honour; the "Lt Gen William Callaghan Sword" is awarded to the cadet who displays the best tactical ability.

== Honours and awards ==
Lieutenant General O'Callaghan was a recipient of the Distinguished Service Medal, French Legion of Honour, and Lebanese National Order of the Cedar.

== Personal life and family ==
O'Callaghan's son, Bill O'Callaghan, emigrated to the United States and became a doctor at the Mayo Clinic in Arizona in the 1980s, also becoming an Arizona state commissioner.

O'Callaghan's grandson, Conor O'Callaghan (born 1983), was announced to be campaigning for Arizona’s Congressional District 1 in August 2023.
