= United Nations Security Council Resolution 49 =

UN Security Council Resolution 49
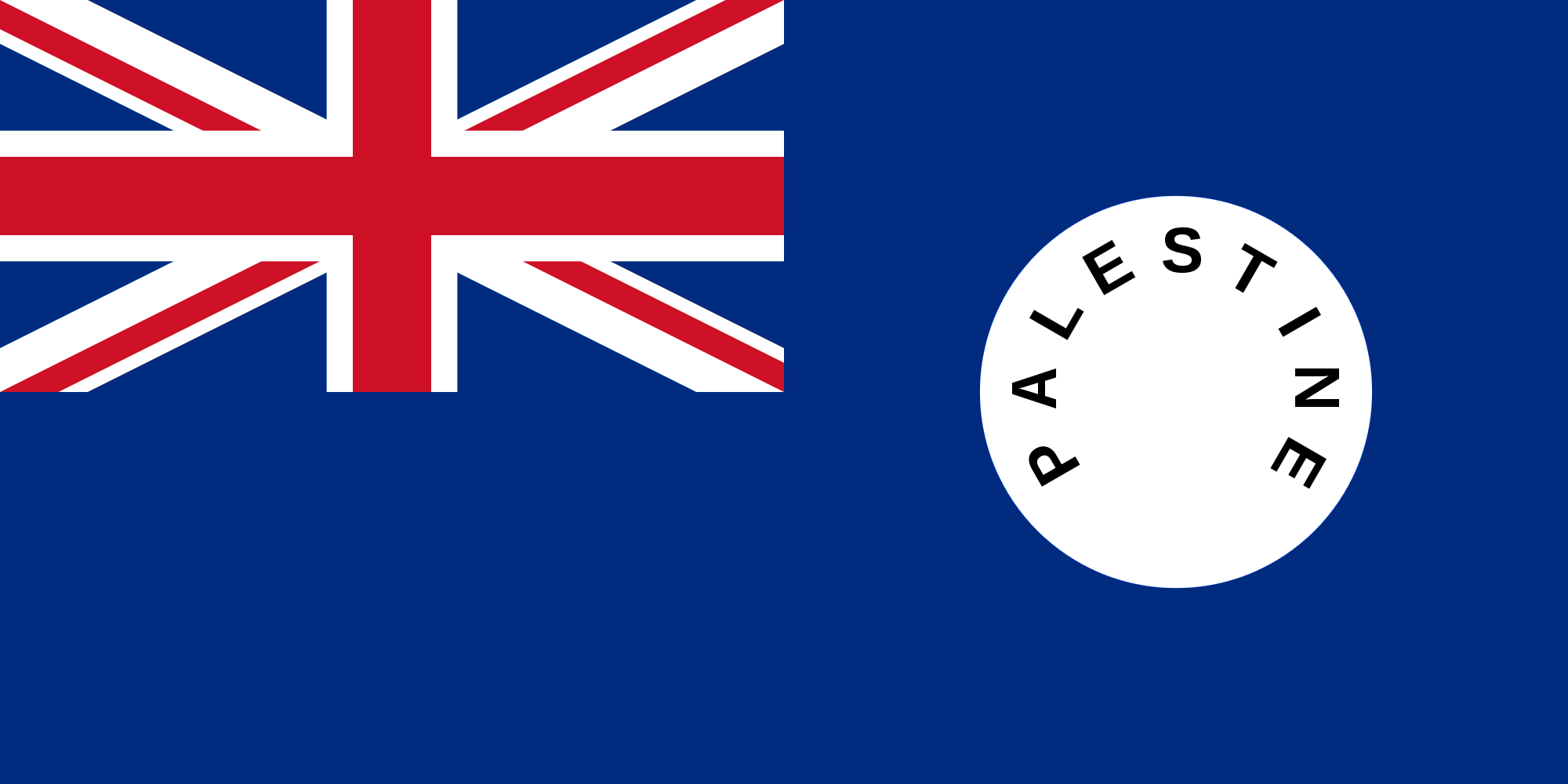
- Palestine flag
- Date: 22 May 1948
- Meeting no.: 302
- Code: S/773 (Document)
- Subject: The Palestine Question
- Voting summary: 8 voted for; None voted against; 3 abstained
- Result: Adopted

Security Council composition
- Permanent members: China; France; Soviet Union; United Kingdom; United States
- Non-permanent members: Argentina; Belgium; Canada; Colombia; Syria; Ukrainian SSR

United Nations Security Council Resolution 49, adopted on May 22, 1948, considering that the previous resolutions of the Security Council in respect to Palestine have not been complied with and that military operations were still taking place in Palestine, the resolution called upon all governments and authorities to abstain from any further hostile military action in Palestine and to that end issue a cease-fire order to their military and paramilitary forces to come into effect at noon, May 24, 1948, New York City local time. The resolution further ordered the Truce Commission for Palestine set up in United Nations Security Council Resolution 48 to report to the council on the compliance of the concerned parties with the resolution.

The resolution passed with eight votes and three abstentions from the Ukrainian SSR, the Soviet Union and Syria.

== See also ==
- List of United Nations Security Council Resolutions 1 to 100 (1946–1953)
- United Nations Security Council Resolution 48
- United Nations Security Council Resolution 50
