= Battle of Khiam (2000) =

In the South Lebanon conflict

- Part of the South Lebanon conflict (1985–2000)
Date	April 2000
Location	Khiam, South Lebanon
Result	Decisive Hezbollah victory
Territorial changes	Khiam detention center captured by Hezbollah.

Belligerents
South Lebanese Army	Hezbollah

The battle of Khiam, fought between Hezbollah and the South Lebanon Army (SLA) in April and May 2000, which became a crucial step in the disintegration of the South Lebanon Army, in light of the coming withdrawal of IDF troops from South Lebanon.

== Background ==
The Khiam detention center was originally a French barrack complex, built in the 1930s. It became a base for the Lebanese army, before falling under control of the South Lebanon Army (SLA) and in 1985 was converted into a prison camp. It remained in use until Israel's withdrawal from Lebanon.

In July 1999, Ehud Barak became Israel's Prime Minister, promising Israel would unilaterally withdraw to the international border by July 2000. Prior to his actions, many believed that Israel would only withdraw from South Lebanon upon reaching an agreement with Syria. During the spring of 2000, Hezbollah operations stepped up considerably, with persistent harassment of Israeli military outposts in occupied Lebanese territory. As preparation for the major withdrawal plan, Israeli forces began abandoning several forward positions within the security zone of South Lebanon.

== Events ==
In April 2000, a Hezbollah force approached the Khiam detention center in an attempt to make a surprise attack on the SLA facility. The force was repelled with casualties.

In May 2000, upon increasing disintegration among the SLA ranks, Hezbollah fighters reinforced by local Shia residents and civilians of Khiam attacked the facility and following a short battle took over the prison. Several SLA soldiers were taken captive. The prisoners of the detention center (mostly Hezbollah militants and activists) were released.

== Aftermath ==
On 24 May, Israel announced that it would withdraw all troops from South Lebanon. All Israeli forces had withdrawn from Lebanon by the end of the next day, more than six weeks before its stated deadline of 7 July. Just prior to the announcement many of the command staff of the South Lebanon Army abandoned their positions and fled into Israel with their families. The announcement further escalated the disintegration and with the completion of Israeli withdrawal, some 6,000 former SLA soldiers and commanders with their families fled to Israel, abandoning their weaponry and homes. On June 16, 2000, UN Security Council concluded that Israel had indeed withdrawn its forces to internationally recognized border with Lebanon, in accordance with United Nations Security Council Resolution 425 (1978).

Though Israel considered this move as tactical withdrawal, the withdrawal of the IDF and the disintegration of the South Lebanon Army eventually led to complete take over of Hizbullah over south Lebanon and increasing Hizbullah's strength in Lebanese politics. The low level conflict with Israel had continued along the border in the vicinity of Shabaa, where Hizbullah engaged continuous bombardment of Israeli positions and abducted the bodies of 3 Israeli soldiers in October 2000.

== See also ==
- South Lebanon security belt administration
