= Khiam =

City in Nabatieh Governorate, Lebanon

Khiam الخيام
- Municipality
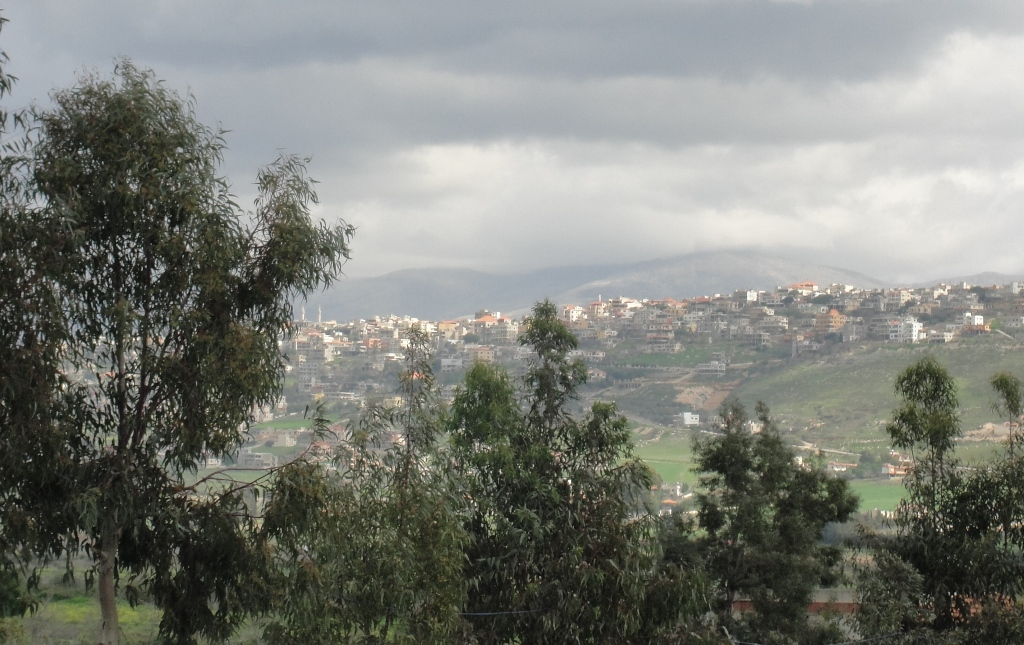

- Location within Lebanon
- Coordinates: 33°19′38″N 35°36′40″E
- Grid position: 137/154L
- Country: Lebanon
- Governorate: Nabatieh Governorate
- District: Marjayoun District
- Elevation: 1,700 m (5,600 ft)

Population (2010)
  - Total: 28,580
- Time zone: UTC+2 (EET)
  - Summer (DST): UTC+3 (EEST)
- Dialing code: +961

Khiam (Arabic: الخيام, romanized: al-Khiyām) is a municipality in Nabatieh Governorate, Lebanon. Parts of Khiam are currently occupied by Israel as part of their occupation of southern Lebanon.

== Etymology ==
According to Edward Henry Palmer, the name means tents. Haifa Nassar, a Khiam-based journalist, cites sources that confirm this. Muhammad Qubawasi, author of a book on South Lebanon, writes that according to the Torah, Jacob moved his family and livestock to the plain of Khiam, where he lived in tents.

== Location ==
Khiam is situated approximately 100 kilometres (62 mi) south from the capital city of Beirut and 35 kilometres (22 mi) south-east from the city of Nabatieh. The border with Israel is 5 kilometres (3 mi) to the south. Khiam lies at a height of 800 metres (2,625 ft) above sea level.

== History ==
=== Ottoman period ===
In the 1596 Ottoman tax records, the village of Hiyam was located in the nahiya (subdistrict) of Tibnin under the liwa' (district) of Safad, with a population of 111 Muslim households and 7 bachelors. The villagers paid a tax on wheat, barley, olive trees, vineyards, goats and beehives, in addition to "occasional revenues"; a total of 6,914 akçe.

In 1838, Eli Smith writes about el-Khiyam, a Metawileh, "Greek" Christian and Maronite village in Merj 'Ayun'.

In 1875, Victor Guérin visited: "El Khiam contains two quarters: the one on the south, with a population of 700 Metawileh, and the other on the north, with 600 Christians, divided into Maronites, Greek-Orthodox, and Greek-Catholics, with some Protestants, who have founded a chapel and a school."

In 1881, the PEF's Survey of Western Palestine (SWP) described it as: "A village, northeast of the Merj Ayun, built of stone, containing about 300 Christians and 200 Druze. It contains a white round Moslem holy place and a modern church. It was situated on a low ridge, surrounded by figs, olives, and arable. The water supply was from three rock-cut cisterns, one birket, and the good spring of 'Ain ed Derdarah."

=== French mandate period ===
The municipality of Khiam was established in 1928 during the French Mandate. The first municipal council, led by Haj Mohammad Haj Hussein Abdullah, was dissolved in 1931.

In 1935, Haj Ali Afandi Haj Ibrahim Abdullah was elected mayor. In 1937, he stepped down after being appointed to the Lebanese parliament.

=== After independence ===
In 1953, Haj Khalil Haidar was re-elected and served as mayor until 1957. In 1957, he was replaced by Hassan Ali Faiz who remained in this position until 1963. A new council was elected in 1963, with 16 members, and Kamel Mohammad Ali Al-Daoui as the mayor and Haj Asaad Khalil Mhana as the deputy mayor. This council continued its work until the outbreak of the Lebanese Civil War in 1975.

During the 1990s, Khiam was the site of the Khiam Detention Center, operated by the South Lebanon Army during the Israeli occupation of Southern Lebanon. Lebanese Shia civilians were exposed to torture by Israeli and Lebanese agents in this camp and faced indefinite detention once arrested. The prison was captured by Hezbollah during the Battle of Khiam in 2000, shortly before the Israeli withdrawal from South Lebanon.

The town saw a major confrontation between the Israeli Army and Hezbollah fighters in the 2006 Lebanon War, during which a United Nations post was bombed by the Israeli Army killing four United Nations Military Observers. The IDF and Hezbollah clashed in the area once again in June 2024, with fighter jets and artillery strikes.

In October 2024, Khiam become the site of heavy fighting between the IDF and Hezbollah. Following the ceasefire, Israel Defense Forces systematically destroyed civilian infrastructure such as roads, electricity and water installations, as well as destroying and damaging every home in the town. The town's inhabitants returned to the rubble, vowing not to abandon their town, recovering items from the rubble and attempting to rebuild.

Following the start of the 2026 Lebanon war, during the Battle of Khiam, Israel captured Khiam as part of their occupation of southern Lebanon. The Lebanese National News Agency reported that Israeli forces continued the demolition of homes even after the 2026 Lebanon ceasefire.

== Demographics ==
In 2014 Muslims made up 93.17% and Christians 6.48% of registered voters in Khiam. 91.29% of the voters were Shiite Muslims.

== Notable people ==
- Ali Daher (born 1996), Lebanese footballer
- Issam Abdallah (1986-2023), Reuters video journalist
- Ali Hassan Khalil (born 1964), former Minister of Finance

== Bibliography ==
- Conder, C.R.; Kitchener, H.H. (1881). The Survey of Western Palestine: Memoirs of the Topography, Orography, Hydrography, and Archaeology. Vol. 1. London: Committee of the Palestine Exploration Fund.
- Guérin, V. (1880). Description Géographique Historique et Archéologique de la Palestine (in French). Vol. 3: Galilee, pt. 2. Paris: L'Imprimerie Nationale.
- HRW (2007). Why They Died: Civilian Casualties in Lebanon During the 2006 War. Human Rights Watch.
- Hütteroth, W.-D.; Abdulfattah, K. (1977). Historical Geography of Palestine, Transjordan and Southern Syria in the Late 16th Century. Erlanger Geographische Arbeiten, Sonderband 5. Erlangen, Germany: Vorstand der Fränkischen Geographischen Gesellschaft. ISBN 3-920405-41-2.
- Palmer, E.H. (1881). The Survey of Western Palestine: Arabic and English Name Lists Collected During the Survey by Lieutenants Conder and Kitchener, R. E. Transliterated and Explained by E.H. Palmer. Committee of the Palestine Exploration Fund.
- Rhode, H. (1979). Administration and Population of the Sancak of Safed in the Sixteenth Century (PhD). Columbia University. Archived from the original on 2016-10-10.
- Robinson, E.; Smith, E. (1841). Biblical Researches in Palestine, Mount Sinai and Arabia Petraea: A Journal of Travels in the year 1838. Vol. 3. Boston: Crocker & Brewster.
