= United Nations Security Council Resolution 50 =

UN Security Council Resolution 50
- Arab League Flag
- Date: May 29 1948
- Meeting no.: 310
- Code: S/801 (Document)
- Subject: The Palestine Question
- Result: Adopted

Security Council composition
- Permanent members: China; France; Soviet Union; United Kingdom; United States
- Non-permanent members: Argentina; Belgium; Canada; Colombia; Syria; Ukrainian SSR

United Nations Security Council Resolution 50, adopted on May 29, 1948, called upon all governments and authorities involved in the conflict in Palestine to order a cessation of all acts of armed force of four weeks, to refrain from introducing any fighting personnel into Palestine, Egypt, Iraq, Lebanon, Saudi Arabia, Syria, Transjordan or Yemen during the cease-fire, to refrain from importing or exporting war material into or to Palestine, Egypt, Iraq, Lebanon, Saudi Arabia, Syria, Transjordan or Yemen during the cease-fire.

The resolution further urged all governments and authorities to do all in their power to ensure the safety of the Holy Places in the area as well as the city of Jerusalem and to ensure free access to them. Instructed the United Nations Mediator in Palestine to make contact with all the parties involved to see that the truce is carried out and offered him as many military observers as would be necessary to that end. The resolution decided that if the conditions set in it and previous resolutions were violated the Council would reconsider the matter with a view to action under Chapter VII of the United Nations Charter.

The resolution was adopted in parts; no voting took place on the resolution as a whole.

== See also ==
- List of United Nations Security Council resolutions concerning Yemen
- List of United Nations Security Council Resolutions 1 to 100 (1946–1953)
- United Nations Truce Supervision Organization
