= United Nations Security Council Resolution 885 =

UN Security Council Resolution 885
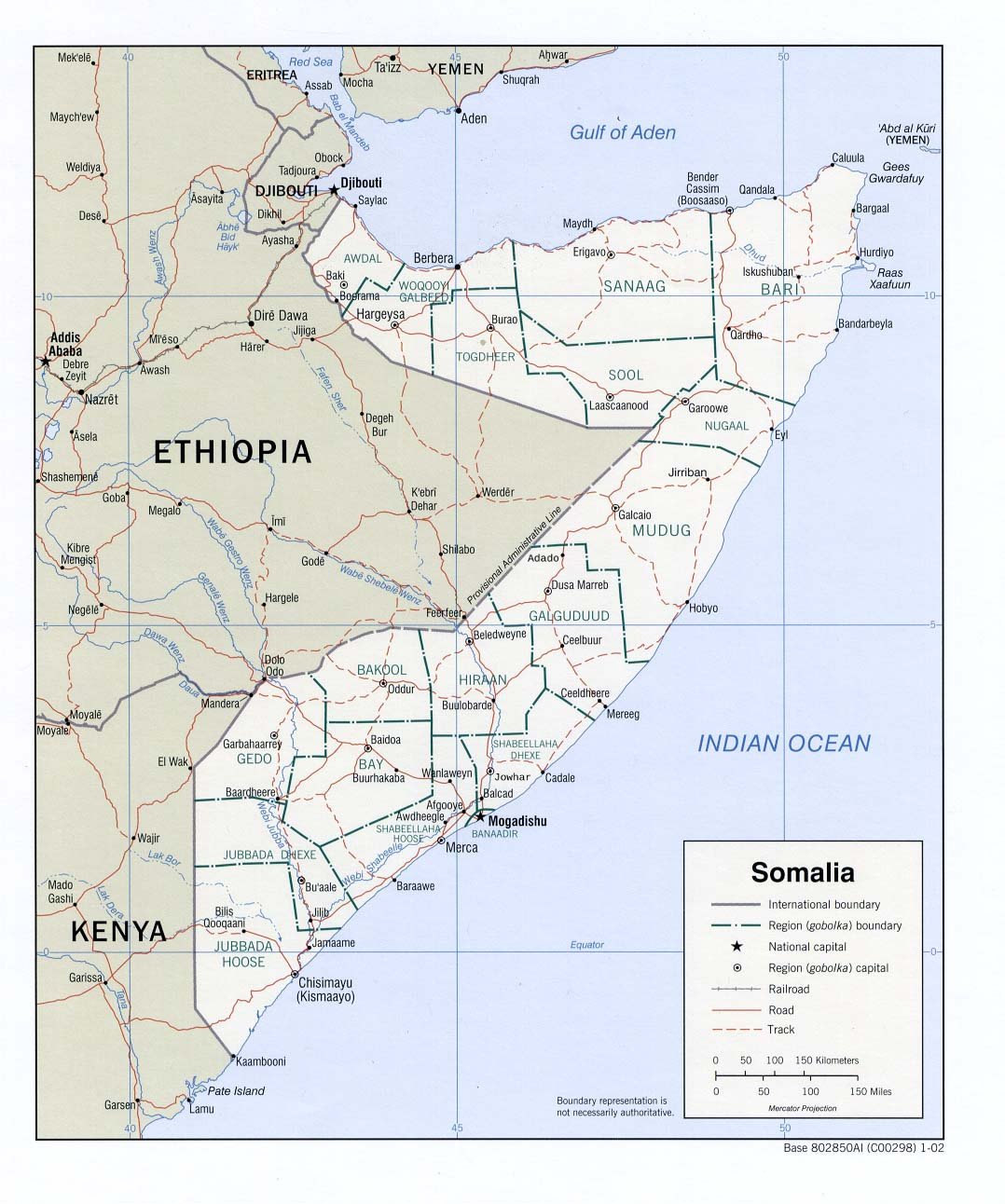
- Somalia
- Date: 16 November 1993
- Meeting no.: 3,315
- Code: S/RES/885 (Document)
- Subject: Somalia
- Voting summary: 15 voted for; None voted against; None abstained
- Result: Adopted

Security Council composition
- Permanent members: China; France; Russia; United Kingdom; United States
- Non-permanent members: Brazil; Cape Verde; Djibouti; Hungary; Japan; Morocco; New Zealand; Pakistan; Spain; Venezuela

United Nations Security Council resolution 885, adopted unanimously on 16 November 1993, after reaffirming resolutions 733 (1992), 746 (1992), 751 (1992), 767 (1992), 775 (1992), 794 (1992), 814 (1993), 837 (1993), 865 (1993) and 878 (1993) on Somalia and Resolution 868 (1993) on the safety of United Nations peacekeeping personnel, the council authorised the establishment of a Commission of Inquiry to investigate attacks on the United Nations Operation in Somalia II (UNOSOM II) which led to casualties.

The need for consultations among all parties to achieve national reconciliation and the establishment of democratic institutions was recognised, in particular stressing that the people of Somalia are responsible for achieving these objectives. The council noted proposals for the establishment of an impartial Commission of Inquiry from the Organisation of African Unity (OAU) and went on to establish the inquiry, while the Secretary-General Boutros Boutros-Ghali was requested to appoint the commission at the earliest possible time.

The commission was directed to determine procedures for carrying out its investigation, while taking into account standard procedures of the United Nations. It also noted that the members of the commission will have the status of experts on mission in accordance with the Convention on the Privileges and Immunities of the United Nations. Boutros-Ghali was required to provide assistance to the commission while the parties in Somalia were urged to co-operate with it.

The council called upon the commission to report as soon as possible and for the secretary-general, on the completion of a report by the commission, to suspend arrest actions against those individuals who were implicated but not currently detained and make provisions to deal with those already detained pursuant to Resolution 837.

== See also ==
- History of Somalia
- List of United Nations Security Council Resolutions 801 to 900 (1993–1994)
- Somali Civil War
