= Operation United Shield =

1995 United Nations mission in Somalia

- Part of United Nations Operation in Somalia II and Civil war in Somalia
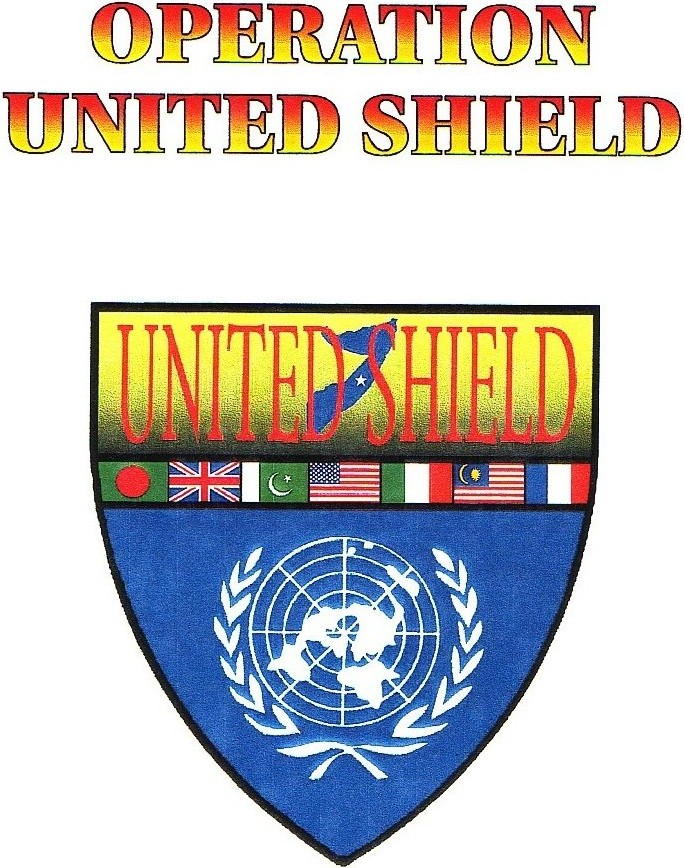
- Official Logo for Operation United Shield
- Operational scope: Tactical
- Type: Military withdrawal
- Location: Somalia
- Planned: 9 January 1992
- Planned by: United States Central Command
- Objective: safe evacuation of personnel of UNOSOM I, UNITAF, and UNOSOM II
- Date: 9 January 1995 – 3 March 1995
- Executed by: United States Navy; Pakistan Navy; Italian Navy
- Outcome: Successful
- Casualties: None; None killed None injured

Operation United Shield was the codename of a military operation, conducted 9 January to 3 March 1995, bringing a conclusion to the United Nations Operation in Somalia II (UNOSOM II). Commanded by the United States, two ships of the Pakistan Navy, five ships of the Italian Navy and six ships of the United States Navy formed a Combined Task Force (CTF) ensuring the safe evacuation of all UN Peacekeeping Forces from Somalia.

== Timeline of United Nations involvement in Somalia ==
- 4–6 January 1991: Operation Eastern Exit – evacuation of the United States embassy in Mogadishu, Somalia
- 23 January 1992: United Nations Security Council Resolution 733 imposed an arms embargo on Somalia
- 17 March 1992: United Nations Security Council Resolution 746 creates United Nations Operation in Somalia I (UNOSOM I), a force composed of 50 military observers, 3,500 security personnel, up to 719 logistic support personnel, and approximately 200 international civilian staff. The mission of UNOSOM I was:
  - 1. to monitor the cease-fire in Mogadishu and help to restore order in Somalia after the dissolution of its central government
  - 2. to provide security for United Nations personnel, equipment and supplies at the seaports and airports in Mogadishu
  - 3. to escort deliveries of humanitarian supplies from there to distribution centers in and around Mogadishu
- 24 April 1992: United Nations Security Council Resolution 751
- 27 July 1992: United Nations Security Council Resolution 767
- 28 August 1992: United Nations Security Council Resolution 775 expands the mandate and strength of UNOSOM I, tasking it with the protection of humanitarian aid convoys and distribution centers throughout Somalia. UNOSOM troop strength was increased to 4,219 troops and 50 military observers. The additional security personnel began to arrive in Mogadishu on 14 September 1992.
- 3 December 1992: United Nations Security Council Resolution 794 approved a greatly expanded coalition of United Nations peacekeepers to be led by the United States. The reorganized force would be called Unified Task Force (UNITAF).
- 4 December 1992: U.S. President George H. W. Bush announces the commencement of Operation Restore Hope, under which the United States would assume command of all U.N. forces in order to carry out the mandate of Resolution 794.
- 9 December 1992: UNITAF forces begin to arrive in Somalia on 9 December 1992 to carry out the mandate of United Nations Security Council Resolution 794. UNITAF was tasked with ensuring the safe distribution of humanitarian aid throughout Somalia (primarily in the south) to alleviate famine conditions.
- 26 March 1993: United Nations Security Council Resolution 814 establishes United Nations Operation in Somalia II (UNOSOM II)
- 4 May 1993: UNITAF is dissolved, and UNOSOM II assumes responsibility for all U.N. operations in Somalia.
- 5 June 1993: UNOSOM II peacekeepers fired into a mob of stone-throwing women and children who acted as a human shield to conceal one or more Somali snipers. 24 UNOSOM II troops (all of whom were Pakistanis) and about 20 Somali civilians were killed in the exchange.
- 6 June 1993: United Nations Security Council Resolution 837
- August 1994: the UN requested that the United States lead a coalition to aid in the final withdrawal of UNOSOM II forces from Somalia.
- December 1994: POTUS agreed to the UN request, and directed United States Central Command to execute Operation United Shield.
- 9 January to 3 March 1995: Operation United Shield

== Background and leadership ==
The political situation in Somalia deteriorated throughout 1993 and 1994, until it was determined that UN peacekeeping forces were in unacceptable jeopardy. On 10 January 1995 the United States Central Command announced that 4,000 personnel (including 2,600 U.S. Marines) would be deployed to Somalia to assist with Operation United Shield. At that time, the UNOSOM II peacekeeping force remaining in Somalia was a combined force of approximately 2,500 troops, from Pakistan and Bangladesh. The United Nations Security Council established 31 March 1995 as the deadline for the departure of all its forces participating in U.N. operations in Somalia.

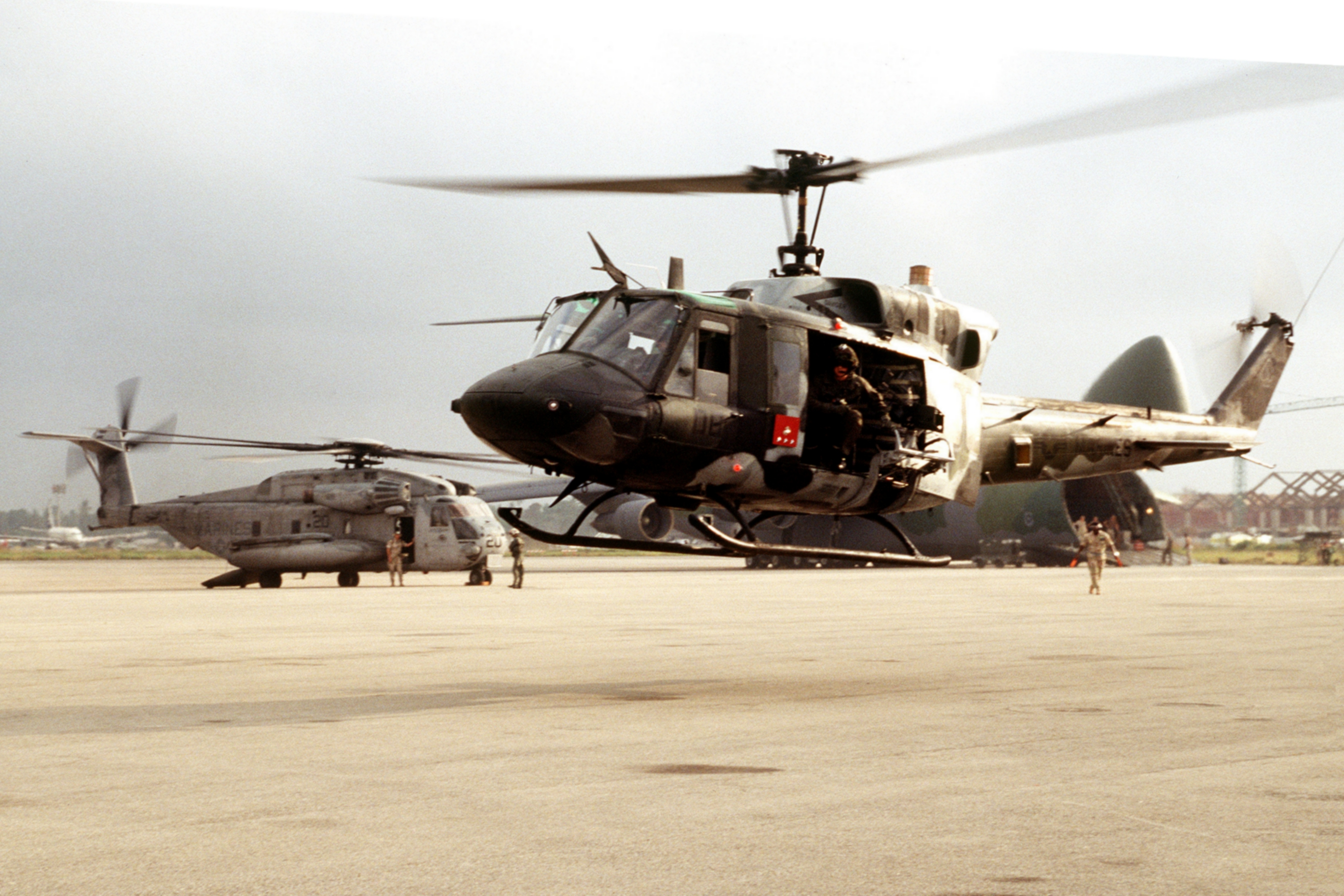
A U.S. Marine Corps Bell UH-1N Twin Huey helicopter lifts off from the ramp at Moi International Airport in February 1995

LtGen Anthony Zinni (Commanding General, I Marine Expeditionary Force) was given command of the operation, which was to ensure the safe execution of an amphibious withdrawal. General Zinni, who served as director for operations for UNITAF during Operation Restore Hope in 1992–1993, knew most of the top Somali leaders at the time of Operation United Shield.

The commanders utilized a 4,000 man air-ground task force to cover the withdrawal and prevent further casualties, while a seaborne coalition of American, Italian, Pakistani, French, British, and Malaysian naval vessels waited just off the coast of Mogadishu to accept the withdrawing forces.

== Execution ==
- 7 January 1995: LtGen Anthony Zinni (Commanding General, I Marine Expeditionary Force) assembled a Combined Task Force consisting of air, ground, naval, psychological, and special operations forces. Coalition forces from Italy, France, United Kingdom, Malaysia, Pakistan, and Bangladesh joined the CTF, under LtGen Zinni's command.
- 17 January 1995: CTF headquarters flew to Singapore and embarked aboard USS USS Belleau Wood (LHA-3).
- 7 February 1995: USS Belleau Wood and its accompanying ships arrived on station at Mogadishu.
- 27–28 February 1995: Just before midnight, Mogadishu time, an amphibious landing began. During this operation, which lasted a little over four hours, the U.S. put a mechanized force consisting of about 1,800 United States marines and 350 Italian marines and airborne soldiers, along with 150 pieces of military equipment ashore. These men and machines (including LCUs, LAVs, AAVs, and LCACs) were employed to rapidly secure Mogadishu International Airport and New Port (the seaport facility). The entire amphibious landing was complete by 0430 on the morning of 28 February.
- 28 February 1995: The UNOSOM II command was relieved, and the CTF began withdrawing the UNOSOM II forces.
- 3 March 1995: 73 hours after the beginning of the amphibious landing, 2,422 United Nations troops, approximately 3,800 CTF troops and over a hundred combat vehicles had been withdrawn without any loss of life among any of the coalition forces.
- 6 March 1995: the CTF redeployed to their respective home stations.
- 17 March 1995: the CTF was disestablished.

== Factors critical to the success of Operation United Shield ==
By the time the Landing Force went ashore, the UNOSOM forces had consolidated and withdrawn to New Port and Mogadishu International Airport.

The most critical stage of Operation United Shield began when the ground combat element (GCE) of the 13th Marine Expeditionary Unit (MEU) conducted an amphibious landing on "Green Beach," near Mogadishu International Airport. The infantry element, Kilo Company of the 3rd Battalion, 7th Marines, (31st MEUSOC) and Battalion Landing Team 3/1, conducted their initial landing in the early morning hours of 1 March 1995, and within hours the bulk of the infantry battalion had passed through the United Nations' perimeter and secured the New Port shipping facility and an area known as "No Man's Land", between the New Port and the UN-occupied Mogadishu International Airport, north of Green Beach.

Two United States Navy CH-53E Super Stallion Helicopters from Helicopter Combat Support Squadron Four played a vital role in placing troops in key areas throughout Mogadishu and then picking up members of the United Nations Peacekeeping Force and flying them out to the United States Ships offshore.

== Naval ships involved in the Combined Task Force ==
=== American ===
- USS Belleau Wood (LHA-3), an amphibious assault ship, SPMAGTF 1-95 Command Platform
- USS Essex (LHD-2), an amphibious assault ship, 13th MEU
- USS Ogden (LPD-5), an amphibious transport dock ship
- USS Fort Fisher (LSD-40), a dock landing ship
- USS Lake Erie (CG-70), a guided-missile cruiser
- USS Kiska (AE-35), an ammunition ship
- USS Cayuga (LST-1186), an amphibious landing tank ship

=== Italian ===
- Giuseppe Garibaldi (551), an Anti-Submarine Warfare Aircraft Carrier (CVS–ASW)
- San Marco (L 9893) LPD
- San Giorgio (L 9892) LPD
- Stromboli (A 5327), a replenishment ship
- Libeccio (F 572), a frigate

=== Pakistan ===
- PNS Shamsheer, a frigate
- PNS Nasr, a replenishment ship
- PNS Ghazi 134, a submarine charged with intelligence management gathering
