= United Nations Security Council Resolution 878 =

UN Security Council Resolution 878
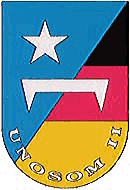
- German UNOSOM II emblem
- Date: 29 October 1993
- Meeting no.: 3,299
- Code: S/RES/878 (Document)
- Subject: The situation in Somalia
- Voting summary: 15 voted for; None voted against; None abstained
- Result: Adopted

Security Council composition
- Permanent members: China; France; Russia; United Kingdom; United States
- Non-permanent members: Brazil; Cape Verde; Djibouti; Hungary; Japan; Morocco; New Zealand; Pakistan; Spain; Venezuela

United Nations Security Council resolution 878, adopted unanimously on 29 October 1993, after reaffirming resolutions 733 (1992), 746 (1992), 751 (1992), 767 (1992), 775 (1992), 794 (1992), 814 (1993), 837 (1993) and 865 (1993) on Somalia, the Council expressed its commitment to a future concerted strategy for the United Nations Operation in Somalia II (UNOSOM II) and extended its mandate for an interim period until 18 November 1993.

The Secretary-General Boutros Boutros-Ghali was requested to report on recent developments in Somalia and on a further extension of UNOSOM II's mandate before 18 November 1993.

== See also ==
- History of Somalia
- List of United Nations Security Council Resolutions 801 to 900 (1993–1994)
- Somali Civil War
