= United Nations Security Council Resolution 865 =

UN Security Council Resolution 865
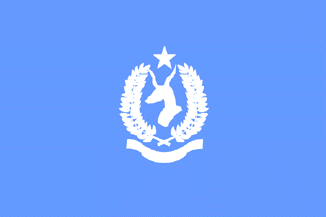
- Flag of the Somali police force
- Date: 22 September 1993
- Meeting no.: 3,280
- Code: S/RES/865 (Document)
- Subject: The situation in Somalia
- Voting summary: 15 voted for; None voted against; None abstained
- Result: Adopted

Security Council composition
- Permanent members: China; France; Russia; United Kingdom; United States
- Non-permanent members: Brazil; Cape Verde; Djibouti; Hungary; Japan; Morocco; New Zealand; Pakistan; Spain; Venezuela

United Nations Security Council resolution 865, adopted unanimously on 22 September 1993, after reaffirming resolutions 733 (1992), 746 (1992), 751 (1992), 767 (1992), 775 (1992), 794 (1992), 814 (1993) and 837 (1993), the Council addressed the process of national reconciliation and political settlement in Somalia, during the civil war.

The Council stressed the importance of continuing the peace process initiated by the Addis Ababa agreement, welcoming the efforts of the Organisation of African Unity (OAU), Arab League and the Organisation of the Islamic Conference. The international community would help the country achieve peace, but ultimately it was the Somali people who were responsible for the reconciliation and reconstruction of their country. Meanwhile, the improvement of the situation with United Nations Operation in Somalia II (UNOSOM II) was welcomed, particularly with the eradication of starvation, establishment of numerous district councils, opening of schools and the resumption of normal life for most Somali people. At the same time, the Council recognised the need to continue efforts to achieve reconciliation and establish democracy, and in this respect all parties were urged to show their political will to achieve the aforementioned.

Concern was then expressed at reports of violence in the capital Mogadishu, violence against UNOSOM II and the lack of law enforcement and legal institutions in the country. The Council reiterated its request to the Secretary-General Boutros Boutros-Ghali to assist with the re-establishment of the Somali police and the restoration of peace, stability and order.

The improvement of the conditions and the beginning of the rebuilding of the country were praised, while attacks on UNOSOM II were condemned, stating that the perpetrators would be held individually responsible. The Council affirmed the importance it attached to the UNOSOM II mission including facilitation of humanitarian assistance, restoration of law and order and national reconciliation in a free, democratic and sovereign Somalia so that it could complete its mission by March 1995. The Secretary-General was asked to draw a detailed plan concerning the future strategy of the mission and redouble his efforts to achieve reconciliation at all levels. Member States were invited to help by staffing UNOSOM II positions.

The Security Council agreed to the recommendations of the Secretary-General on the re-establishment of the police and the legal and penal system, urging immediate steps to implement them. In this regard, the Secretary-General's decision to convene a meeting of Member States interested in assisting in this process was welcomed. Finally, the Secretary-General was also asked to ensure that the Somali police and legal institutions would continue until December when more financial resources would become available from Member States.

== See also ==
- History of Somalia
- List of United Nations Security Council Resolutions 801 to 900 (1993–1994)
- Somali Civil War
