= Operation Provide Relief =

Somali famine relief

Operation Provide Relief was a United States spearheaded humanitarian relief airlift that ran from August to December 1992 in response to the famine in Somalia. This effort was assisted by the United Nations Operation in Somalia I (UNOSOM I) mission, in light of a severe food crisis initiated and exacerbated by ongoing factional fighting. However, there were significant obstructions to delivering relief aid due to the security situation. This prompted the UN to pass Resolution 794, which paved the way for the more robust, multinational Unified Task Force operation in December 1992.

== Background ==
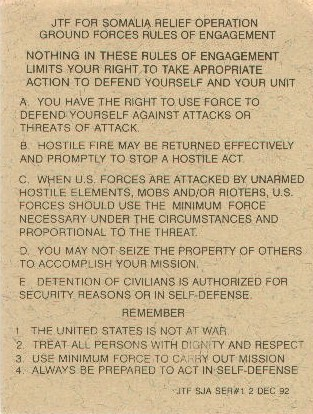
Rules of Engagement for Operation Provide Relief, 1992.

In January 1991, President of Somalia Mohammed Siad Barre, was overthrown by a coalition of rebel groups, including the United Somali Congress, Somali Salvation Democratic Front (SSDF), Somali National Movement (SNM), Somali Patriotic Movement (SPM) and Somali Democratic Movement (SDM). Many of the opposition groups began competing for influence in the ensuing power vacuum. In the south, armed factions led by USC commanders General Mohamed Farah Aidid and Ali Mahdi Mohamed, in particular, clashed as each sought to exert power over the capital Mogadishu.

In June 1991, a ceasefire was nominally agreed upon. In September 1991, the armistice was breached as fighting broke out again between Mogadishu factions. The armed confrontations continued in the following months and spread throughout the country, with over 20,000 people killed or injured by the end of the year.

These battles led to the destruction of the local agricultural sector, which in turn precipitated a food crisis in large parts of Somalia. The international community in response sent emergency rations. As a consequence, an estimated 300,000 people are believed to have died of starvation between 1991 and 1992. In July 1992, after a ceasefire between the opposing southern-based clan factions, the United Nations sent 50 military observers to supervise the food supply distributions.

== Humanitarian operation ==
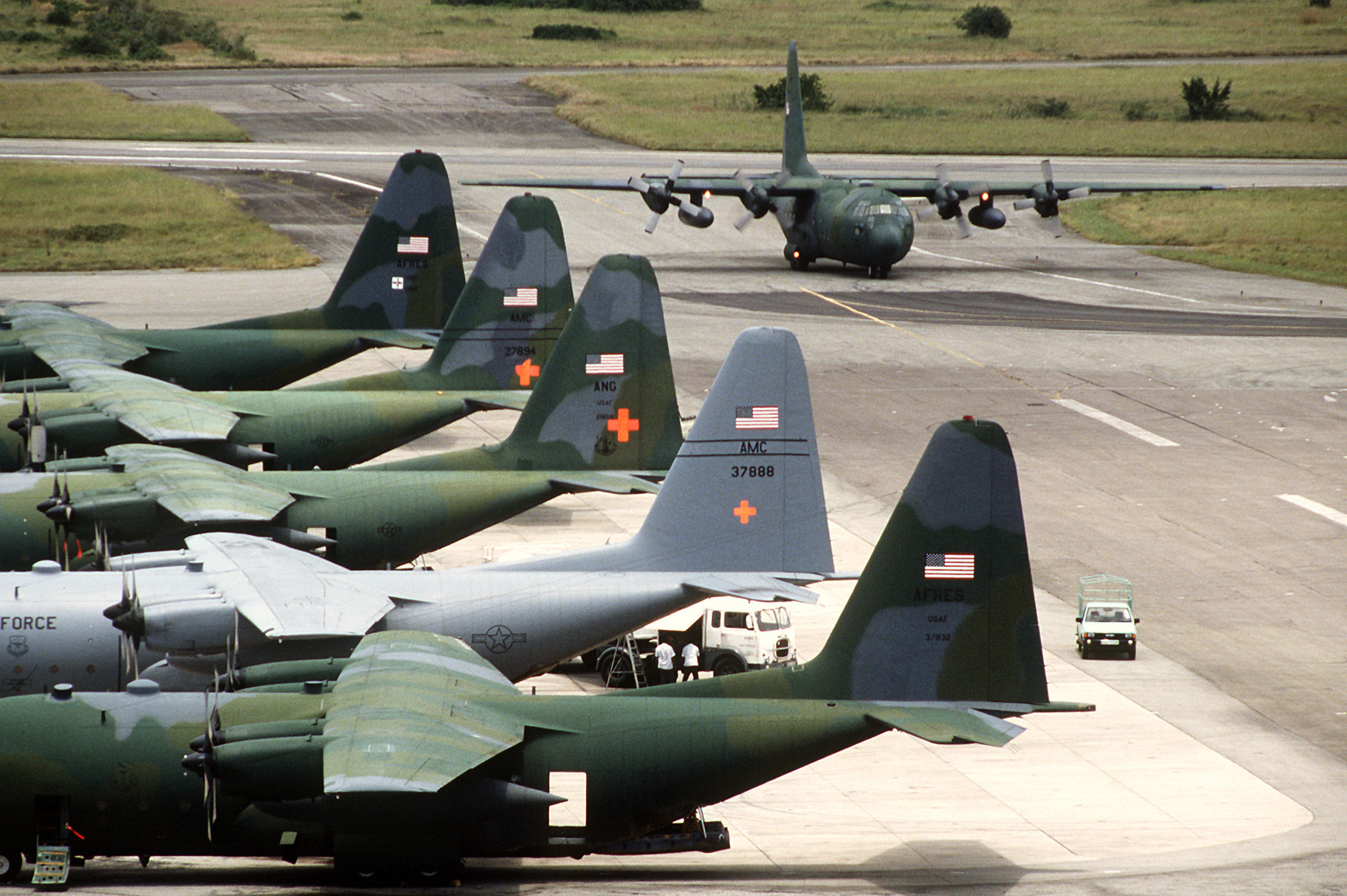
Eighteen U.S. Air National Guard and Air Force Reserve C-130s flew 20 missions per day from Moi International Airport (Mombasa Airport) to Somalia for Operation Provide Relief.

Operation Provide Relief began in August 1992, when the White House announced US military transports would support the multinational UN relief effort in Somalia. Ten C-130s and 400 people deployed to the Moi International Airport during Operation Provide Relief, airlifting aid to remote areas in Somalia to reduce reliance on truck convoys.

The Air Force C-130s delivered 48,000 tons of food and medical supplies in six months to international humanitarian organizations. When this proved inadequate to stop the massive death and displacement, the United Nations Security Council passed Resolution 794 on 3rd December 1992, a major peacekeeping mission which authorized the use of all necessary means to assure a protected environment for conducting humanitarian operations. Concurrently, the U.S. launched Operation Restore Hope, a major coalition operation led by the United Task Force (UNITAF) to assist and protect relief activities. The US provided approximately 25,000 of the 37,000 troops provided.

After a long and protracted effort, the operation was eventually successful in saving many lives, as well as in de-escalating the high-intensity conflict into low-level, local skirmishes. However, the initiative has been criticized for expanding beyond its original boundaries ("mission creep"). The Washington-based Refugee Policy Group NGO in November 1994 suggests that any assessment of the success of Operation Provide Relief is "so fraught with methodological problems that it is rarely attempted." As such, it asserts that excess mortality had already peaked by the time that the first relief programs in and flights to southern Somalia were set up. The think tank offers a conservative estimate that about 100,000 lives were saved as a result of international assistance, 10,000 of which occurred after U.S. troops arrived in December 1992.

== See also ==
- Operation Restore Hope
- Operation Deliverance
- 2011 East Africa drought
