= United Nations Security Council Resolution 837 =

United Nations Security Council resolution

UN Security Council Resolution 837
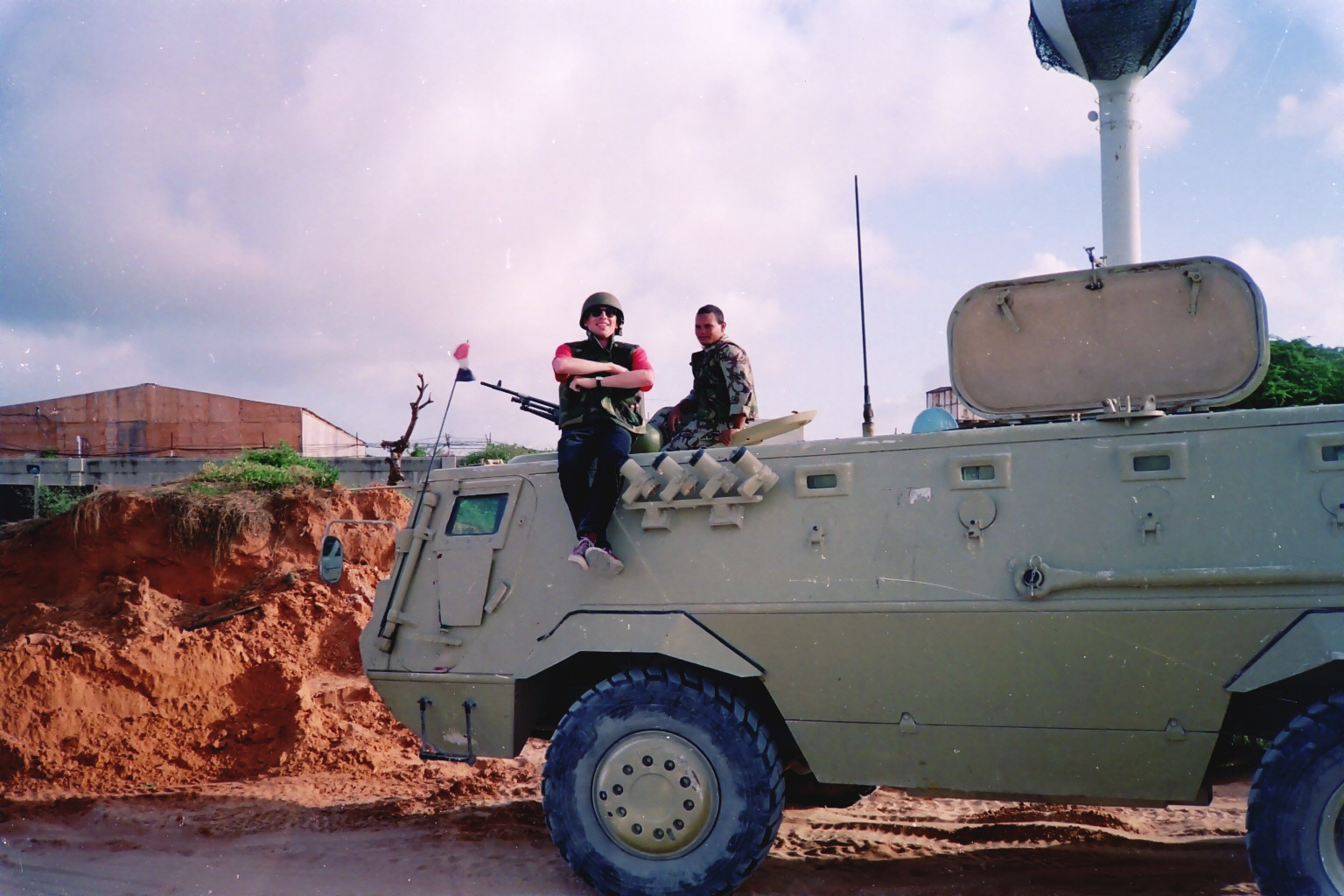
- Egyptian troops in Somalia
- Date: 6 June 1993
- Meeting no.: 3,229
- Code: S/RES/837 (Document)
- Subject: Somalia
- Voting summary: 15 voted for; None voted against; None abstained
- Result: Adopted

Security Council composition
- Permanent members: China; France; Russia; United Kingdom; United States
- Non-permanent members: Brazil; Cape Verde; Djibouti; Hungary; Japan; Morocco; New Zealand; Pakistan; Spain; Venezuela

United Nations Security Council resolution 837, adopted unanimously on 6 June 1993, after reaffirming resolutions 733 (1992), 746 (1992), 751 (1992), 767 (1992), 775 (1992), 794 (1992) and 814 (1993), the Council condemned the attacks on the United Nations Operation in Somalia II (UNOSOM II) in which 24 Pakistani troops were killed and 56 injured, including 1 Italian and 3 American soldiers.

Acting under Chapter VII of the United Nations Charter, the Council re-emphasised the importance of the early implementation of the disarmament of all Somali parties, factions and movements, as well as neutralizing radio broadcasting systems that contributed to attacks towards United Nations forces. It also demanded that all parties in Somalia comply with the commitments they had undertaken in the agreements they concluded at the informal Preparatory Meeting on Somali Political Reconciliation in Addis Ababa, Ethiopia, reaffirming that the UN Secretary-General Boutros Boutros-Ghali is authorised to take action against those responsible for the armed attacks against UNOSOM II to establish its authority throughout Somalia.

During private UNSC consultations, Russia proposed creating an international tribunal to try people who attacked UN personnel. Russian Ambassador Yuli Vorontsov would argue the attackers should be punished through legal or military mean.

The Council concluded by encouraging the deployment of all UNOSOM II contingents to meet the full requirements of 28,000 men; urging Member States to contribute equipment to the Operation; and for the Secretary-General to report back on the situation within seven days of the adoption of the current resolution.

Based on this resolution, the decision was made to arrest General Mohamed Farrah Aidid of the Somali National Alliance (SNA). Though Aidids name appeared on an early draft of the resolution, it was removed by the Americans on account of a lack of tangible evidence. Instead the Americans, "...pushed hard to identify the SNA" according to U.S. Special Envoy to Somalia Robert B. Oakley. The SNA was consequently directly named, and became an enemy of UNOSOM. As the leader of the Somali National Alliance, Aidid was still held accountable, although he was not captured.

== See also ==
- History of Somalia
- List of United Nations Security Council Resolutions 801 to 900 (1993–1994)
- Somali Civil War
