= HC-4 =

Helicopter Combat Support Squadron 4
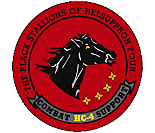
- HC-4 insignia
- Active: 6 May 1983 – 28 September 2007
- Country: United States
- Branch: United States Navy
- Type: Combat Support Unit
- Size: 35 officers / 240 enlisted
- Garrison/HQ: Naval Air Station Sigonella, Sicily, Italy
- Nickname: Black Stallions
- Motto: "The Navy's Premiere Heavy Lift Combat Support Squadron"
- Engagements: Operation Desert Storm; Operation Southern Watch; Operation United Shield; Operation Enduring Freedom; Operation Iraqi Freedom
- Decorations: European Region National Defense Transportation Association Award (2) Golden Anchor Award (3); Silver Anchor Award (1); Navy Unit Commendation (5); Meritorious Unit Commendation (3); Navy Battle "E" Efficiency Award (3); Joint Meritorious Unit Commendation Secretary of Defense Maintenance Award

Commanders
- Current commander: N/A (HC-4 is disestablished)

Helicopter Combat Support Squadron FOUR (HC-4) was a United States Navy helicopter squadron based at Naval Air Station Norfolk, Virginia. Nicknamed the "Black Stallions", they flew the Sikorsky CH-53E Super Stallion and MH-53E Sea Dragon helicopters.

== History ==
The Black Stallions were established on 6 May 1983 as a heavy lift combat support squadron and designated HC-4 (for Helicopter Combat).

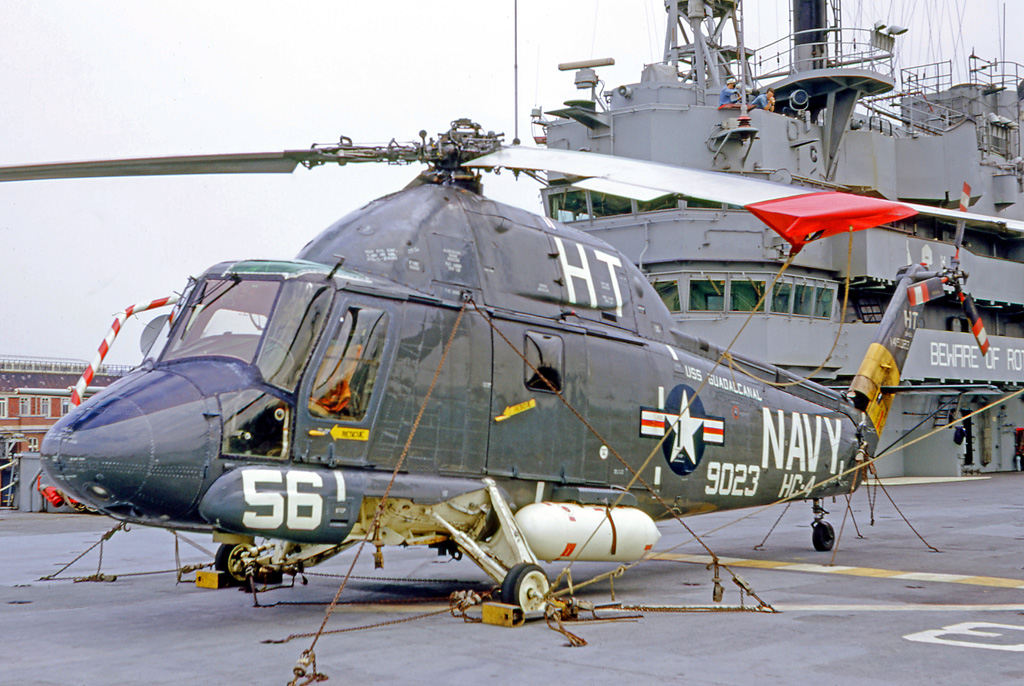
Kaman UH-2A Seasprite of HC-4 Squadron aboard USS Guadalcanal in 1970.

On 1 July 1960 Helicopter Utility Squadron Four (HU-4) was established at NAS Lakehurst, New Jersey, and tasked with the logistic support of non-aviation ships of the U.S. Atlantic Fleet. To describe its mission more accurately, the squadron was redesignated as Helicopter Combat Support Squadron Four in July 1965, and HC-4 was born. The unit was equipped with the Kaman UH-2A Seasprite light transport helicopter. Eight years later, the young squadron assumed a new mission of Helicopter Anti-submarine Warfare and was renamed HSL-30.

In the early 1980s, the advent of the Sikorsky CH-53E Super Stallion was to change the face of helicopter logistics support forever. With twice the lifting capacity and far greater range than any of its predecessors, the CH-53E was the most capable heavy-lift helicopter in the NATO inventory. Recognizing this unique aircraft's phenomenal potential for fleet support, the U.S. Navy commissioned its first, and only dedicated CH-53E squadron on 6 May 1983. Granted the designator HC-4, this squadron became the present-day "Black Stallions."

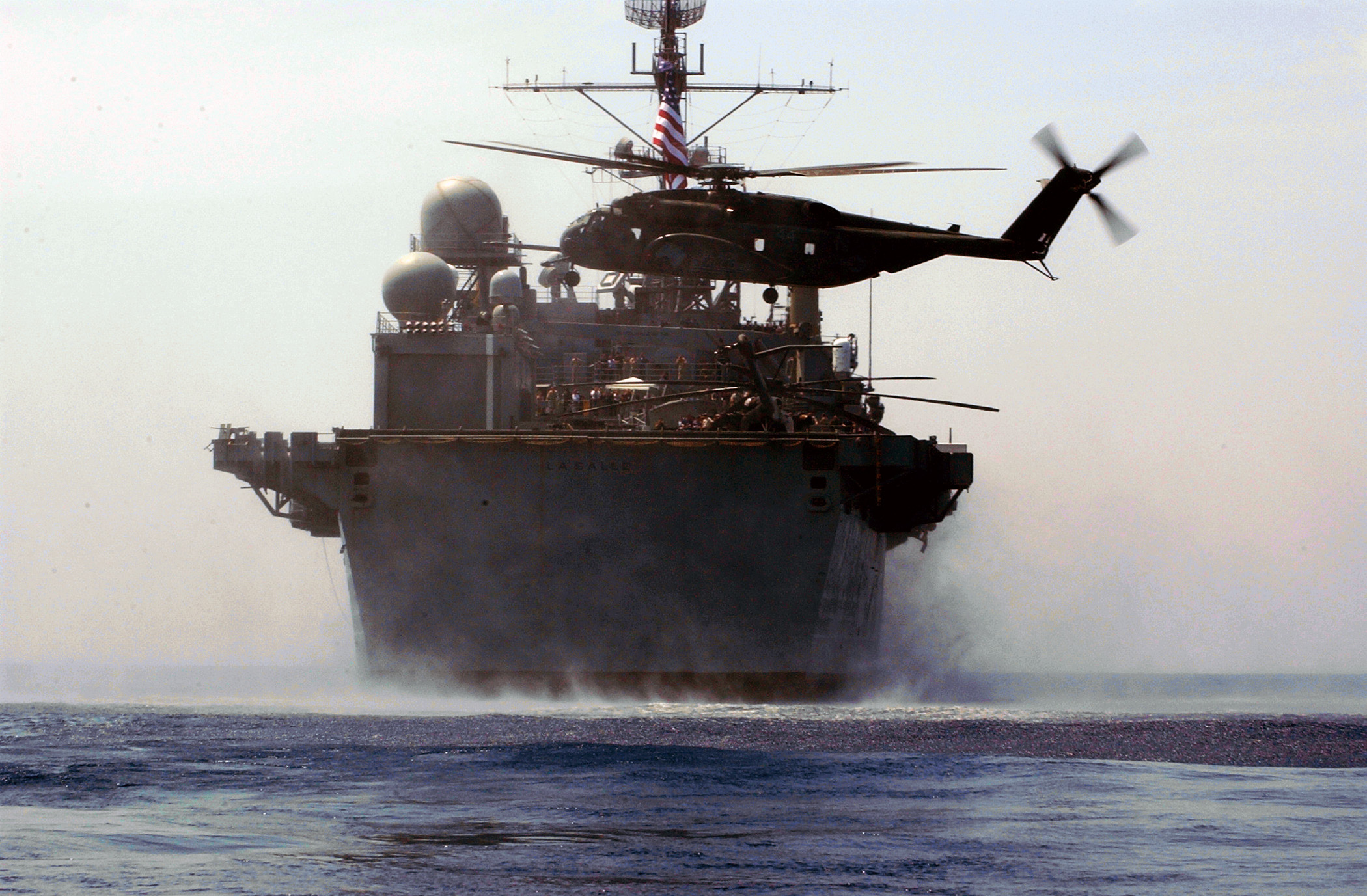
An MH-53E Sea Dragon stirs up the sea with the power of its rotors as it prepares to land on the deck of the command ship USS La Salle (AGF 3).

Arriving at their new home of NAS Sigonella, Italy on 25 August 1983, the "Black Stallions" exceeded records for fleet air logistics in theater. In their first year, they delivered more than sixteen thousand passengers and six and a half million pounds of cargo and mail. While providing combat support throughout Europe, Africa, and the Middle East, HC-4 has participated in every major naval operation and exercise in theater since the squadron's establishment. The plankowner Commanding Officer was Commander Ronald Aubrey McDaniel, previously the commanding officer of VR-24 at NAS Sigonella, Sicily.

To ensure logistic service to SIXTH Fleet Task Forces, U.S. Naval Forces in Europe, and other U.S. Navy ships operating independently, HC-4 routinely deployed one or two aircraft to strategic locations throughout its vast area of responsibility. 12 August 1990 two CH-53E aircraft were deployed to Jedda SA, the first American combat support force to arrive in SA. In 1992, this area of responsibility was expanded by the establishment of a permanent two-aircraft detachment in the Persian Gulf. Working out of Bahrain International Airport, Detachment ONE provided over 80% of all airlifted cargo in the Persian Gulf and surrounding area.

In February 1995, as the "Black Stallions" began their transition to the MH-53E Sea Dragon. HC-4 phased out the CH-53E's and replaced them with nine MH-53E's. This transition was completed in February 1996 with the departure of the Navy's last two CH-53E's from NAS Sigonella. The Sea Dragon's range of up to 650 nautical miles (without refueling) and top speed of 150 knots (280 km/h) brought the entire Mediterranean and Persian Gulf regions within easy reach.

In August 1996, HC-4 transported the Prime Minister of Israel, Benjamin Netanyahu, along with 23 other high-ranking members of the Israeli government. Since the squadron was established, the "Black Stallions" have been called upon to support U.S. Presidential visits to Europe and the Middle East. HC-4 supported President Clinton's visits to northern Ireland, Paris, Italy, Macedonia and an historic December 1998 visit to Israel and Palestine. Presidential support continued under President Bush in 2003, as HC-4 supported visits to Switzerland and the United Kingdom. When the United Nations' peacekeeping mission to Somalia collapsed, HC-4 was called upon to evacuate U.N. forces. While Sierra Leone erupted into violence, HC-4 again responded, deploying two aircraft to help evacuate Americans from that country.

World events in 2004 kept the Black Stallion on the move. Vice President Cheney was personally transported by the Black Stallions while later that year the squadron supported President Bush's attendance at a NATO Summit in Turkey. HC-4 also provided transport for the U.S. Ambassador to NATO and Secretary of Defense personnel at a second NATO conference in Romania.

HC-4 has always served a vital role in the Operation Enduring Freedom and Operation Iraqi Freedom, most recently while operating a detachment out of Fujairah, U.A.E. All Black Stallion pilots and aircrew trained to become the first night-vision device (NVD) qualified squadron in the MH-53. After training, the squadron deployed in direct support of the War on Terror and Operation Iraqi Freedom.

Since their commissioning, the "Black Stallions" of HC-4 have received numerous personal and unit awards. They include two European Region National Defense Transportation Association awards, three Golden Anchor and one Silver Anchor awards for retention, five Navy Unit commendations, three Meritorious Unit Commendations, three Navy Battle "E" Efficiency awards, a Joint Meritorious Unit Commendation and the Secretary of Defense Maintenance Award.

HC-4 was previously home-based at Naval Air Station Sigonella, located in Sicily, Italy. The squadron completed a homeport change to Naval Station Norfolk in 2005–06.

The squadron was disestablished on 28 September 2007.

== See also ==
- List of inactive United States Navy aircraft squadrons
- List of United States Navy aircraft designations (pre-1962)
- List of United States naval aircraft
- Military aviation
- Naval aviation
