= United Nations Security Council Resolution 814 =

UN Security Council Resolution 814
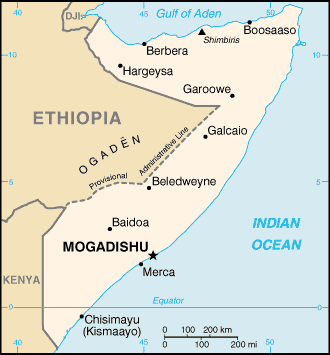
- Somalia
- Date: 26 March 1993
- Meeting no.: 3,188
- Code: S/RES/814 (Document)
- Subject: Somalia
- Voting summary: 15 voted for; None voted against; None abstained
- Result: Adopted

Security Council composition
- Permanent members: China; France; Russia; United Kingdom; United States
- Non-permanent members: Brazil; Cape Verde; Djibouti; Hungary; Japan; Morocco; New Zealand; Pakistan; Spain; Venezuela

United Nations Security Council resolution 814, adopted unanimously on 26 March 1993, after reaffirming resolutions 733 (1992), 746 (1992), 751 (1992), 767 (1992), 775 (1992) and 794 (1993) on the ongoing civil war in Somalia, the council, acting under Chapter VII of the United Nations Charter, authorised an extension of the United Nations Operation in Somalia II (UNOSOM II) until 31 October 1993.

The resolution began by indicating its appreciation to the Secretary-General Boutros Boutros-Ghali for convening the Conference on National Reconciliation for Somalia in which some progress was made and that a wide range of Somali people were represented. It also welcomed the convening of the Third United Nations Coordination Meeting for Humanitarian Assistance for Somalia in Addis Ababa from 11 to 13 March 1993. The Council then requested the secretary-general, through his special representative, to:

(a) assist in the provision of relief to Somalia in accordance with the rehabilitation programme drawn up by the Office for the Coordination of Humanitarian Affairs;
(b) assist in the repatriation of refugees and displaced persons within the country;
(c) promote political reconciliation, including the re-establishment of national and regional institutions and civil administrations through broad participation of all sectors of Somali society;
(d) facilitate the re-establishment of the Somali police and restoration of law and order, including investigations into violations of international humanitarian law;
(e) assist in demining and in the development of public information services;
(f) create conditions under which Somali civil society may have a role at every level in the process of political reconciliation.

The council then extended and strengthened the mandate of UNOSOM II under Chapter VII, emphasising the need for disarmament and the need to support the Unified Task Force (UNITAF). It demanded Somali parties fulfil their obligations to the agreements they signed and ensure the safety of United Nations personnel and those of international organisations, as well as requesting the secretary-general to enforce from inside Somalia the arms embargo imposed in Resolution 733 alongside member states.

The resolution then requested the secretary-general to provide security during the repatriation of refugees and the assisted resettlement of displaced persons, reiterating its call for all Somali parties to cease and desist from violations of international humanitarian law. It also directed Boutros-Ghali to direct the Force Commander of UNOSOM II to organize a prompt, smooth and phased transition from UNITAF to UNOSOM II, and to maintain the fund for receiving contributions to UNOSOM II.

Resolution 814 concluded by welcoming the efforts United Nations agencies, intergovernmental and non-governmental organizations and the International Committee of the Red Cross in Somalia; requests the secretary-general to seek further financing for institutions in Somalia and for him to keep the council fully informed on the situation in the country.

== See also ==
- History of Somalia
- List of United Nations Security Council Resolutions 801 to 900 (1993–1994)
- Somali Civil War
