= Unified Task Force =

1992–1993 UN peacekeeping mission in Somalia

Operation Restore Hope
- Part of the Somali Civil War
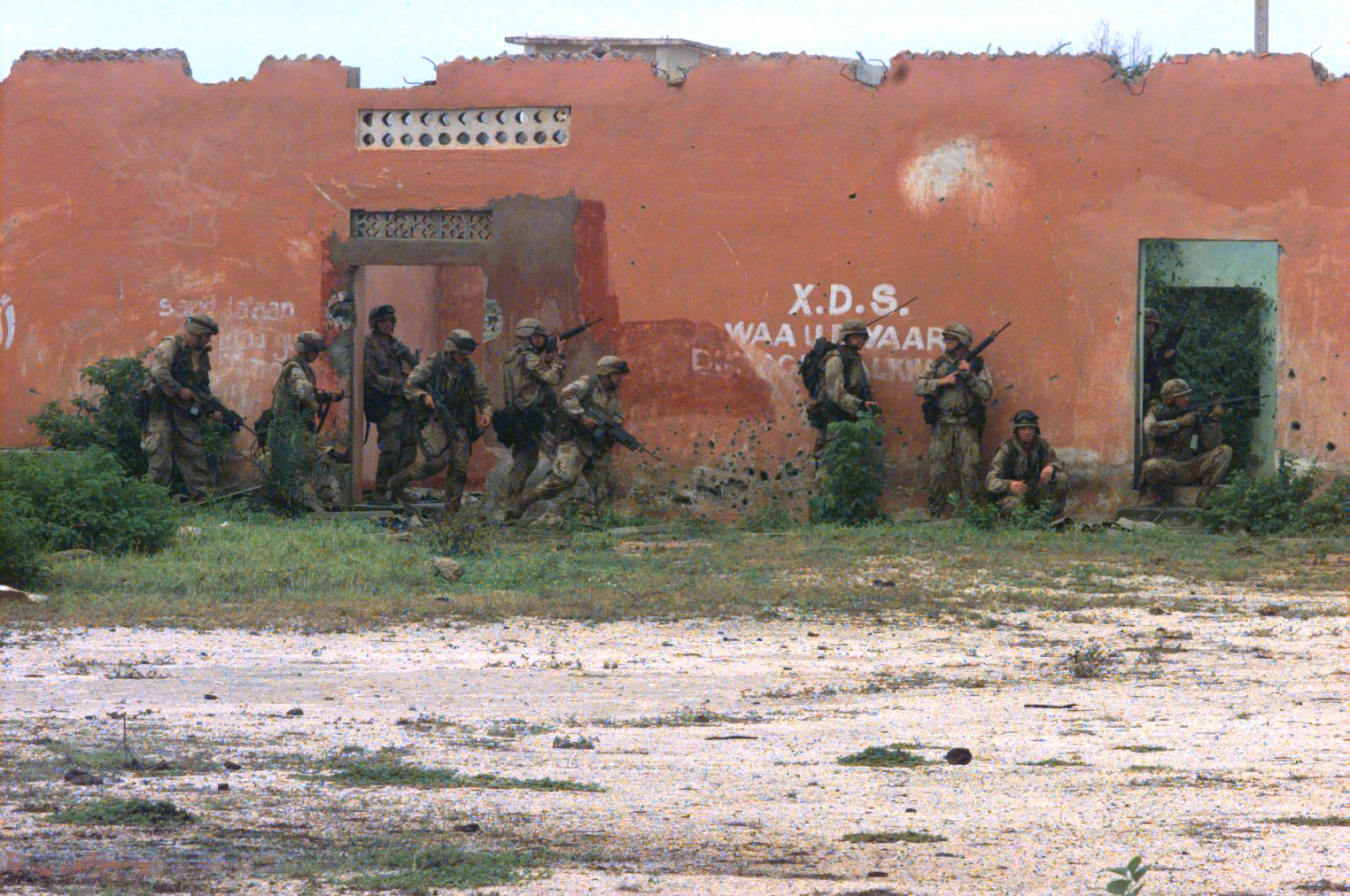
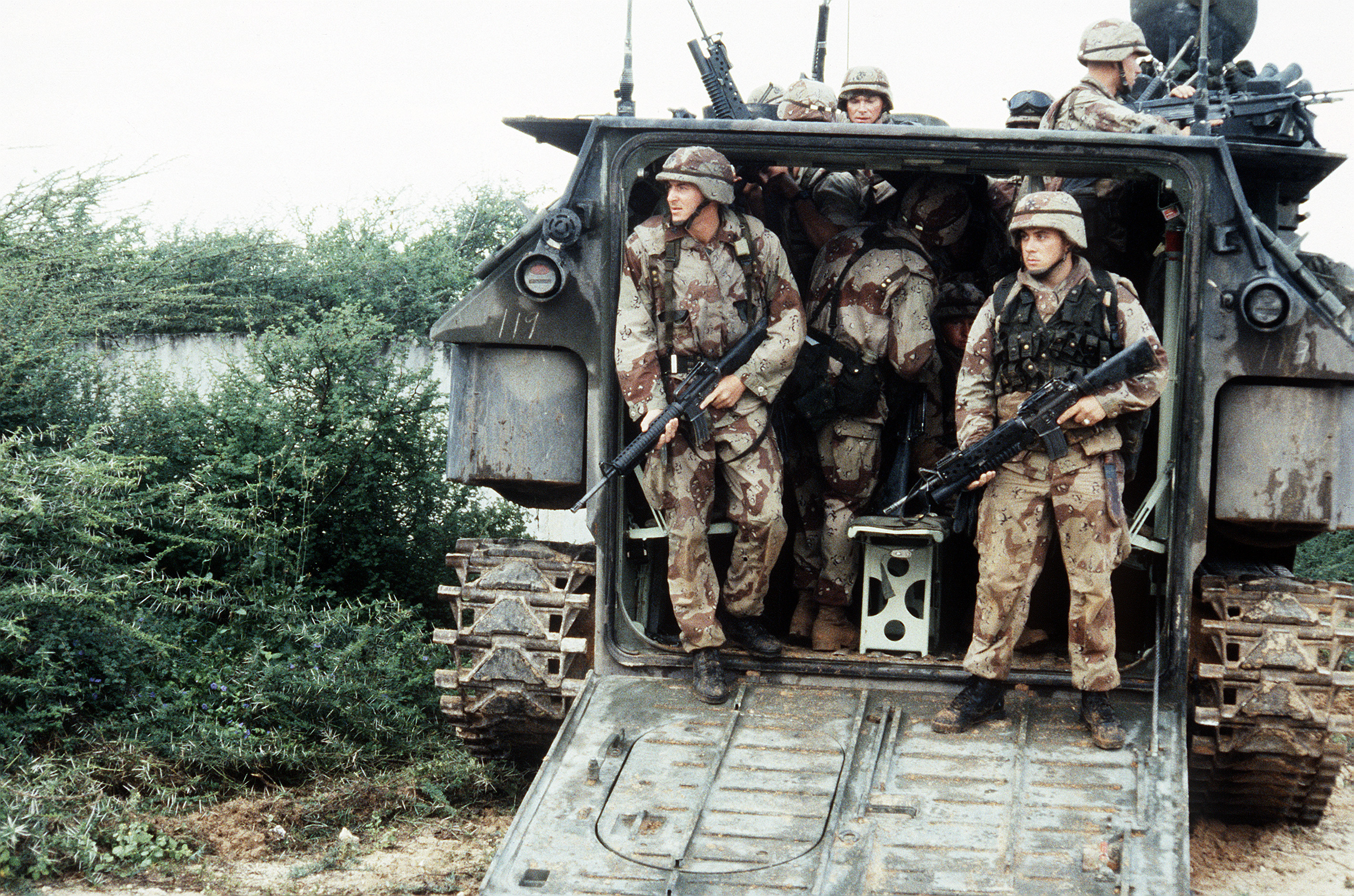
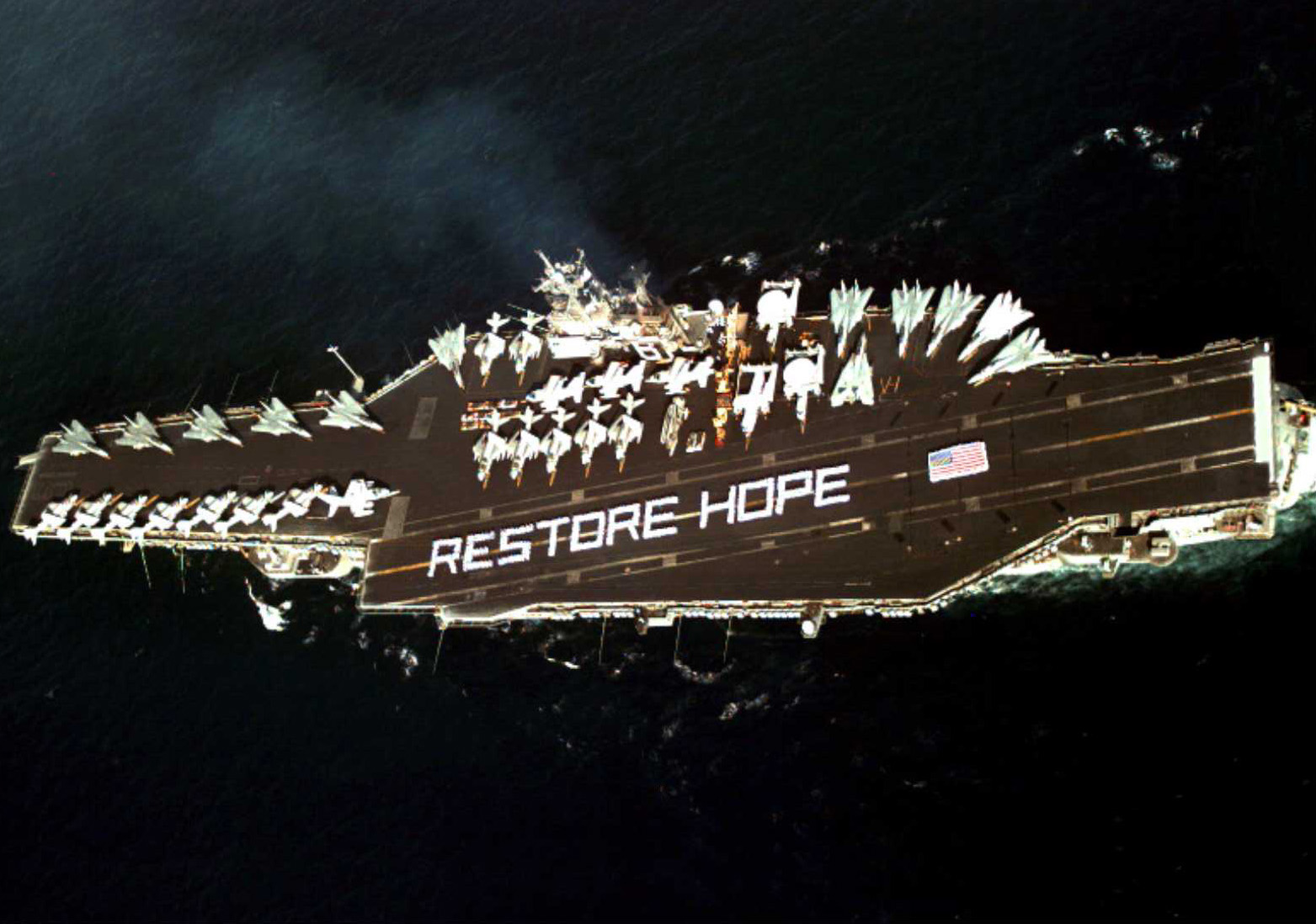
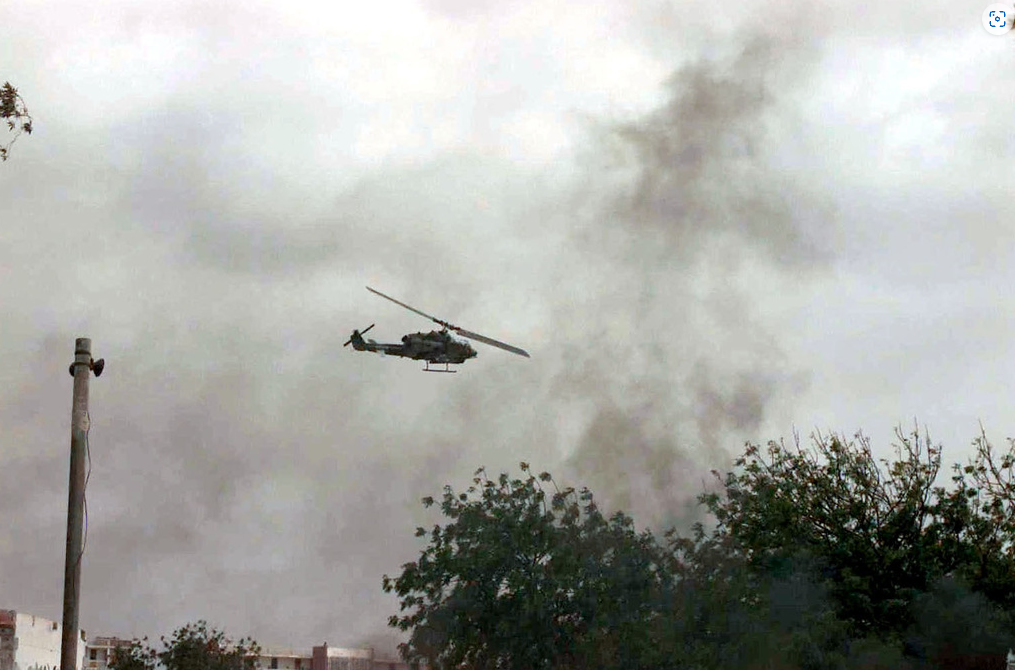
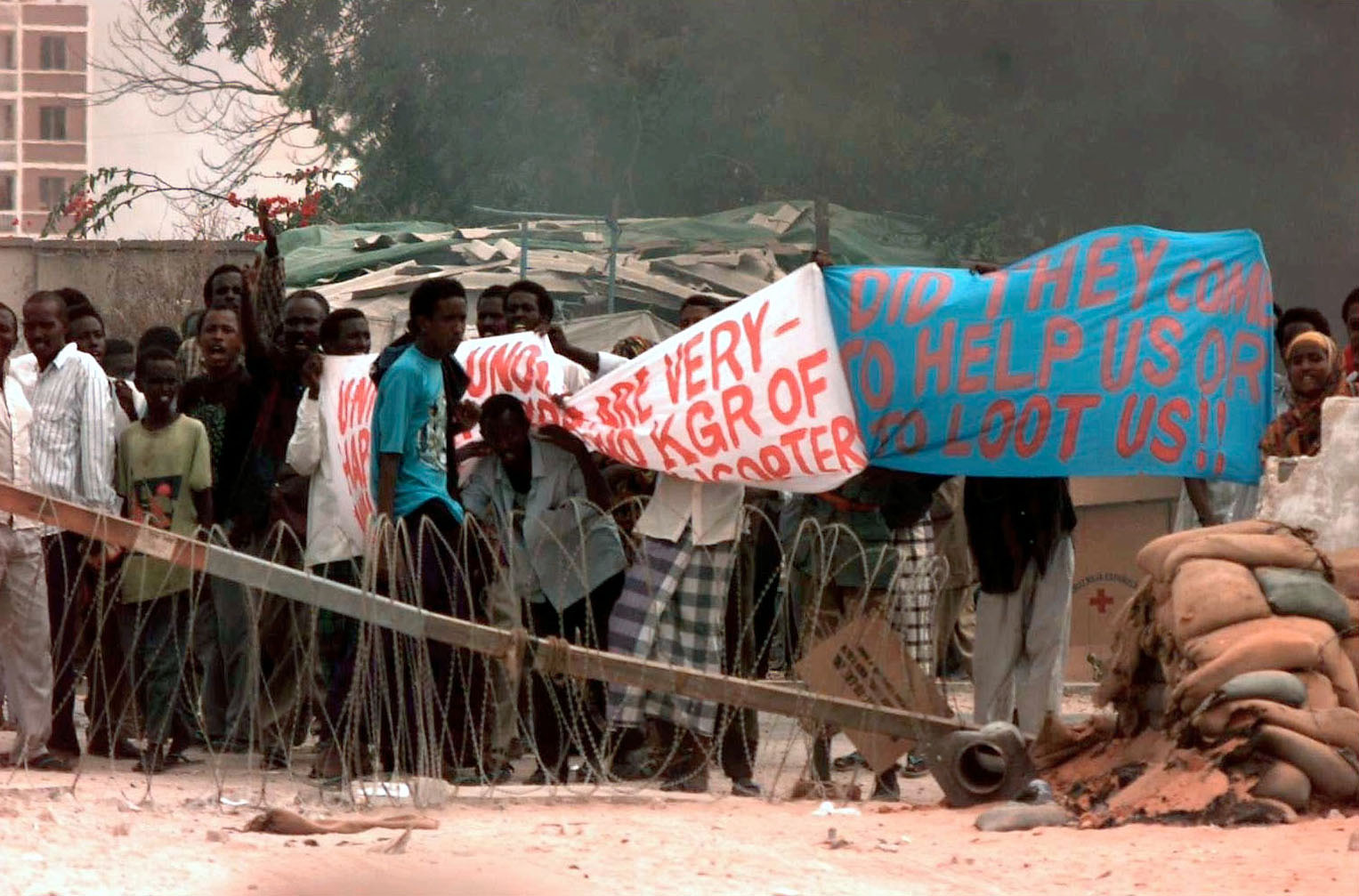
- Clockwise from top: United States Marines in Mogadishu; Marines exiting an amphibious assault vehicle; USS Ranger off the coast of Somalia; US AH-1 Cobra attack helicopter providing air support; Protestors outside the US embassy in Mogadishu
Date	5 December 1992 – 4 May 1993 (6 months, 4 weeks and 1 day)
Location	Somalia
Result	Operational success; transition to UNOSOM II

Participants
UNITAF: Australia; Bangladesh; Belgium; Botswana; Canada; Egypt; Ethiopia; France; Germany; Greece; India; Indonesia; Italy; Kuwait; Malaysia; Morocco; New Zealand; Nigeria; Norway; Pakistan; Saudi Arabia; Spain; Sweden; Tunisia; Turkey; UAE; United Kingdom; United States; Zimbabwe	(Somalia) Somali National Alliance; Al-Itihaad al-Islamiya

Commanders and leaders
(United Nations): Boutros Boutros-Ghali; (United States) George H. W. Bush; (United States) Bill Clinton; (United States) Robert B. Johnston	(Somalia) Mohamed Farrah Aidid; Hassan Dahir Aweys

The Unified Task Force (UNITAF), as part of the international military intervention known as Operation Restore Hope, was a United States–led, United Nations–sanctioned coalition military force deployed to Somalia from 5 December 1992 to 4 May 1993. It was established to replace United Nations Operation in Somalia I (UNOSOM I), which had been deployed in April 1992 in response to the 1992 famine—a crisis that followed the 1991 collapse of the Somali Democratic Republic and the full outbreak of the Somali Civil War.

UNITAF was mandated to create a secure environment for humanitarian operations "by all necessary means". The task force, led by 28,000 US troops, included international contributions from dozens of armed forces, totaling around 37,000 troops. Military deployments focused on the south, as central and northern Somalia remained relatively stable. UNITAF forces began landing in Somalia during early December 1992, by which point the famine had almost ended; it has been estimated that relief efforts only shortened the famine by one month.

Aspects of the operation, in particular the large foreign military deployment, faced opposition from significant segments of Somali society and major factions such as the Somali National Alliance and Al-Itihaad al-Islamiya. Several instances of human rights violations by UN contingents later emerged, including Canada’s Somalia Affair and Italy’s Gallo Commission, which exposed cases of abuse and murder of civilians. Overall, UNITAF avoided an armed conflict due to American Lt. Gen. Robert B. Johnston's strict rules of engagement—aimed at winning the Somali public's confidence—an approach abandoned in the succeeding phase of the UN operation in Somalia.

In May 1993, UNITAF handed over its responsibilities to United Nations Operation in Somalia II (UNOSOM II), transitioning to a broader UN-led mission; however, the operation effectively remained under US control. Approximately 10,000–25,000 lives were saved as a result of the UNITAF and UNOSOM II operation.

== Background ==
During the 1980s, the Somali Rebellion intensified, eventually culminating in the outbreak of full-scale civil war in 1991, which led to the collapse of the Somali Democratic Republic. The following year, a famine emerged, driven by both a major drought and the serious fighting that engulfed the nation’s breadbasket in the southern regions.

=== Deployment of UN forces ===
Faced with a humanitarian disaster in Somalia, exacerbated by a complete breakdown in civil order, the United Nations created the UNOSOM I mission in April 1992. During July 1992 the first UN troops landed in Somalia, seven Pakistani military troops under the command of Brigadier-General Imtiaz Shaheen. Some elements were actively opposing the UNOSOM intervention. Troops were shot at, aid ships attacked and prevented from docking, cargo aircraft were fired upon and aid agencies, public and private, were subject to threats, looting and extortion.

In August 1992, UNOSOM I head Mohammed Sahnoun secured an agreement with Mohamed Farah Aidid and the Somali National Alliance (SNA) to allow 500 UN peacekeepers, with the condition that any further deployments required SNA approval. However, later that month, UN Secretary-General Boutros Ghali announced plans to expand UNOSOM to 3,500 troops without consultation, to the surprise of both Sahnoun and the SNA. According to Professor Stephen Hill, Sahnoun recognized this move would undermine his local support, as it was made “without consulting Somali leaders and community elders.” He attempted to delay the deployment but was overruled by UN headquarters. The large-scale foreign intervention in late 1992 fueled nationalist opposition to international troops, strengthening support for Aidid’s SNA, which condemned the UN’s perceived colonial practices. Somali Islamist factions such as Al-Itihaad Al-Islamiya also demonstrated hostility to a foreign military presence. John Drysdale, a prominent advisor hired by the UN for the operation warned that Somalis would widely see a military deployment as gumeysi (foreign oppression) if it was perceived to be made without their sanction.

The head of UNOSOM I, Mohammed Sahnoun, was replaced by an Ismat T. Kittani during November 1992. Kittani immediately adopted a confrontational stance ordered the deployments of UNOSOM troops in politically sensitive areas, sparking a security crisis with local Somali factions. Kittani pushed claims that 80% of all aid shipments were being looted, which was later repeated by the UN Secretariat and the US State Department to justify expanding the scope of the intervention in Somalia. Alex de Waal observes that though the statistic was treated as fact by the Americans and UN, "its origins are untraceable." Doctors Without Borders noted that nobody on the ground could seriously claim that such a proportion was not getting through, while staff at various aid agencies operating in Somalia such as World Food Program, the Red Cross and CARE contested that real figures were far lower. The head of UNOSOM I troops, Brigadier-General Imtiaz Shaheen of the Pakistani army, stated in an interview with British journalists that the amount of aid being looted was being exaggerated in order justify expanding the scope of the operation and that estimates of 80% were completely fabricated.

=== Expansion of operation and American military intervention ===
The United Nations Secretariat believed Somalia represented an ideal candidate for a test case of a UN operation in expanded size and mandate. In the view of some top UNOSOM I commanders, the scope of the famine in Somalia was being exaggerated in order to justify using Somalia as an experiment for 'conflict resolution'. Rony Brauman, the president of Doctors Without Borders during the intervention in Somalia, observed of UN Secretary General Boutros Ghali, "I think he wanted to make Somalia the test case for using muscular intervention to restore order and rebuild states; underneath that design lay his ambition to create a permanent UN intervention force."

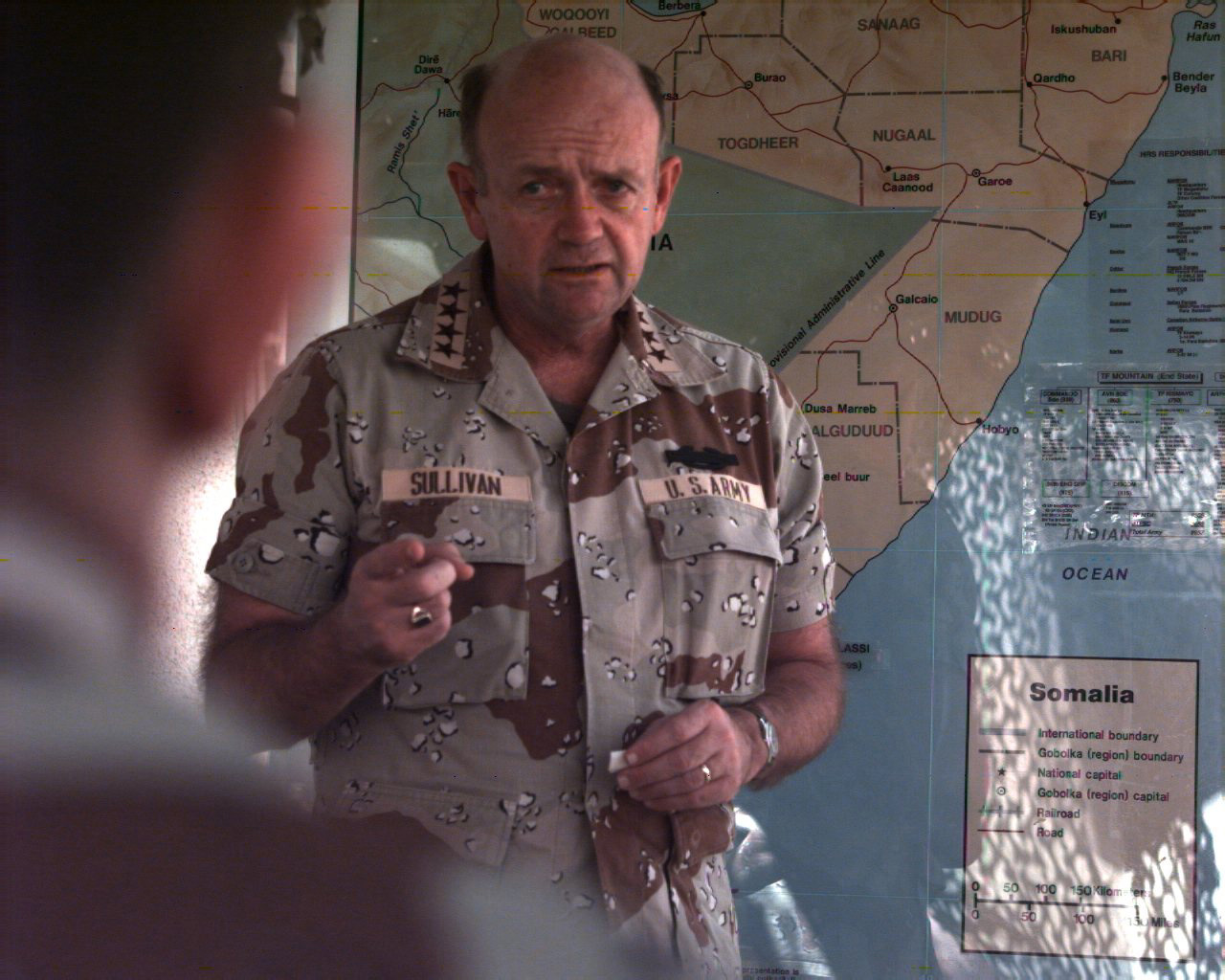
US Army Chief of Staff Gordon R. Sullivan during a briefing about UNITAF

The United States had various motives for military involvement in Somalia. The US armed forces wanted to prove its capability to conduct major 'Operations Other Than War', while the US State Department wanted to set a precedent for humanitarian military intervention in the post-Cold War era. The Los Angeles Times reported that, shortly before the collapse of the Somali Democratic Republic in 1991, nearly two-thirds of the country had been allocated to American oil giants such as Conoco in deals with the government. Some observers in the petroleum industry and East African experts suggested that protecting these concessions played a factor in the decision to launch the operation.

On 3 December 1992 the Security Council unanimously adopted Resolution 794, authorizing the use of "all necessary means to establish as soon as possible a secure environment for humanitarian relief operations in Somalia". The Security Council urged the Secretary-General and member states to make arrangements for "the unified command and control" of the military forces that would be involved. UNITAF has been considered part of a larger state building initiative in Somalia, serving as the military arm to secure the distribution of humanitarian aid. However, UNITAF cannot be considered a state building initiative due to its specific, limited and palliative aims, which it nonetheless exercised forcefully. The primary objective of UNITAF was security rather than larger institution building initiatives.

== Composition ==
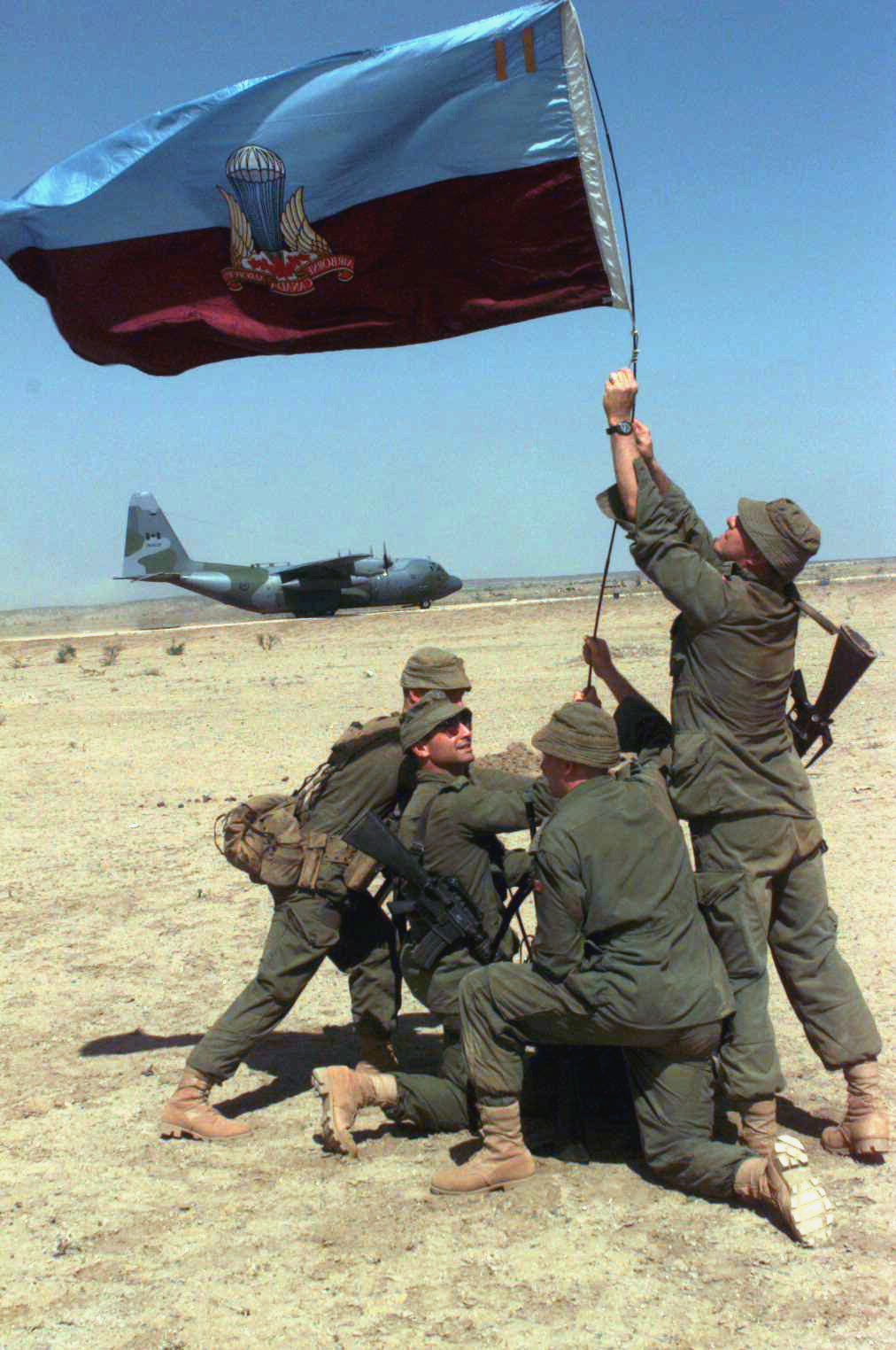
Paratroopers from the Canadian Airborne Regiment under UNITAF raise their flag after seizing a Somali airstrip at Beledweyne

The vast bulk of UNITAF's total personnel strength was provided by the United States (some 25,000 out of a total of 37,000 personnel). Other countries that contributed to UNITAF were 1st Battalion, Royal Australian Regiment from Australia (January–May 1993), Bangladesh, Belgium, Botswana, Canada, Egypt (one battalion), Ethiopia, France (brigade HQ and one battalion), Germany, Greece (medical company at Waajid), the Indian Army (brigade HQ at Baidoa and three battalions), Ireland (transport company), Italy, Indonesia, Kuwait, Morocco, elements of No. 40 Squadron RNZAF from New Zealand, Nigeria, Norway, Pakistan, Saudi Arabia, Spain, Sweden (field hospital), Tunisia, Turkey, United Arab Emirates, the United Kingdom, and Zimbabwe. The national contingents were co-ordinated and overseen by U.S. Central Command, however, the relationship between CentCom and the contributing nations varied. There were a few confrontations over the methods and mandates employed by some contingents. For example, the Italian contingent was accused of bribing local militias to maintain peace, whilst the French Foreign Legion troops were accused of over-vigorous use of force in disarming militiamen. The Canadian contingent of the operation was known by the Canadian operation name Operation Deliverance. The Indian Air Force also provided two HAL Chetak helicopters, an An-12 support aircraft and multiple light transport vehicles. They also were tasked to protect the Mahar regiment by providing air cover during hunting missions and airlifting injured civilians out of the area.

=== United States ===
Prior to Resolution 794, the United States had approached the UN and offered a significant troop contribution to Somalia, with the caveat that these personnel would not be commanded by the UN. Resolution 794 did not specifically identify the U.S. as being responsible for the future task force, but mentioned "the offer by a Member State described in the Secretary-General's letter to the Council of 29 November 1992 (S/24868) concerning the establishment of an operation to create such a secure environment". Resolution 794 was unanimously adopted by the United Nations Security Council on 3 December 1992, and they welcomed the United States offer to help create a secure environment for humanitarian efforts in Somalia. President George H. W. Bush responded to this by initiating Operation Restore Hope on 4 December 1992, under which the United States would assume command in accordance with Resolution 794.

== Operation ==
The operation began on 6 December 1992, when Navy SEALs and other units began laying the groundwork for the landing over a period of three days. In the early hours of 8 December 1992, elements of the US 4th Psychological Operations Group attached to the approaching Marine Expeditionary Unit conducted leaflet drops over the capital city of Mogadishu.

=== Deployment ===
On 9 December 1992, American troops began landing on the Somali coastline at Mogadishu. A total 17,800 US Marines and 10,000 US Army infantry were deployed. The famine in Somalia was already abating as the troops began landing.

Mohamed Farah Aidid, leader of the Somali National Alliance (SNA), initially welcomed the operation, reportedly at the urging of his lieutenant Osman Atto, who had close ties to U.S. embassy officials in Nairobi and the American oil company Conoco. Aidid favored a U.S.-led mission over a UN-led one, given his strained relationship with the UN Secretary-General Boutros-Ghali. Regardless the SNA and other factions lacked the military capability to resist the landings had they wanted to. This non-confrontational stance was reciprocated by the Americans who initially avoided trying to disarm Aidid's faction. American diplomat Robert B. Oakley and US Marine General Robert Johnson made clear in public statements that the intentions of US troops were 'strictly humanitarian' and that their forces would only use force to protect themselves or aid convoys.

Concurrently, various Somali factions returned to the negotiating table in an attempt to end the civil war. This effort was known as the Conference on National Reconciliation in Somalia and it resulted in the Addis Ababa Agreement signed on 27 March 1993. The conference, however, had little result as the civil war continued afterwards.

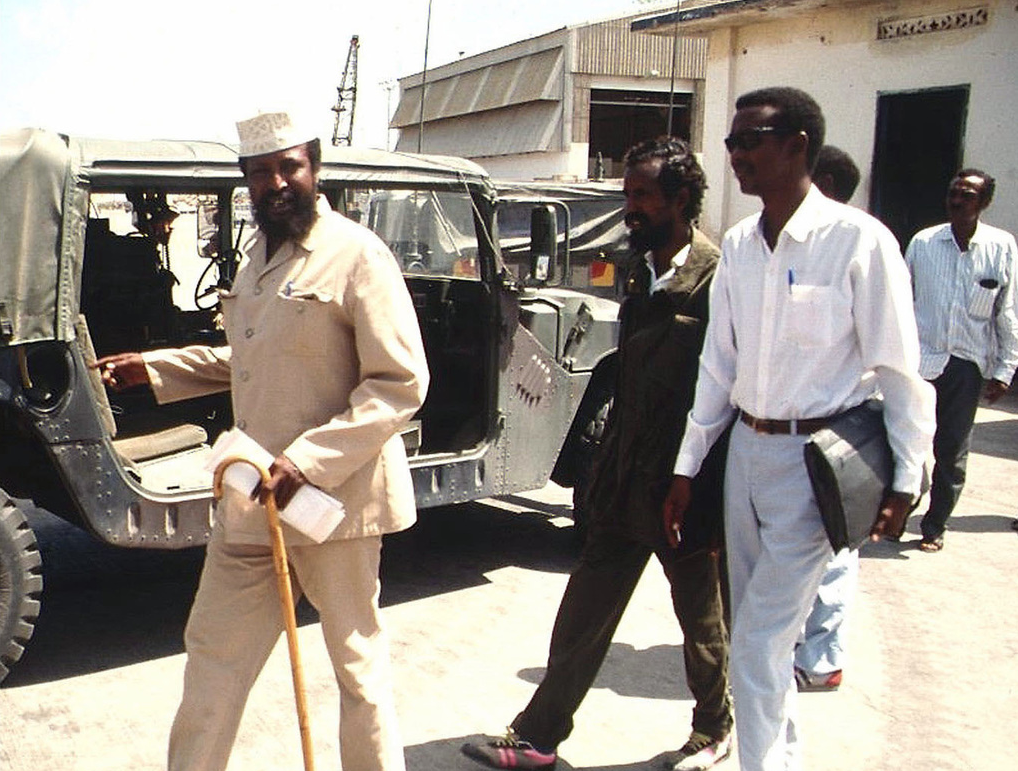
Colonel Omar Jess of the Somali National Alliance and his entourage following a meeting with US military commanders in Kismayo

Many Somalis who would have been otherwise supportive of the operation were antagonized by the behavior of foreign troops. Peacekeepers often displayed a "casual brutality" in encounters with Somalis, particularly American, Italian and Belgian troops who engaged in torture, murder and sexual violence with relative impunity. Testimony from Italian troops later described the routine destruction of Somali property and abuse of detainees, with some Italian soldiers suggesting the death toll was higher than officially acknowledged. Many incidents involving abuses by Belgian troops regarded children with some soldiers also stating that the official reports regarding killings of Somalis were understated.

Despite these issue, UNITAF largely avoided armed conflict with Somali factions due to the careful rules of engagement created by the head of the operation, US Marine Lt. Gen. Robert B. Johnston. Johnston's approach, which focused above all on winning the Somali's public confidence, was lost during the transfer to the far more aggressive UNOSOM II mandate. However some US commanders noted that they viewed the operation in Somalia as being one of peacemaking rather than peacekeeping. Consequently US troops had rules of engagement that allowed troops to "...use enough force to gain control in any situation". This effectively meant that, under certain conditions, American soldiers were permitted to shoot first.

=== Results ===
As UNITAF's mandate was to protect the delivery of food and other humanitarian aid, the operation was regarded as a success. United Nations Secretary-General Boutros Boutros-Ghali determined that the presence of UNITAF troops had a "positive impact on the security situation in Somalia and on the effective delivery of humanitarian assistance." An epidemiological survey determined approximately 10,000 lives had been saved by the military intervention. While UNITAF saw a dramatic increase in the scope of the military intervention, no more lives were saved compared to UNOSOM I. The primary reason was due to the sharp decline in mortality rates during October 1992, before the large scale deployment of troops. Studies on the intervention noted that UNITAF sped up the famine's conclusion by about a month.

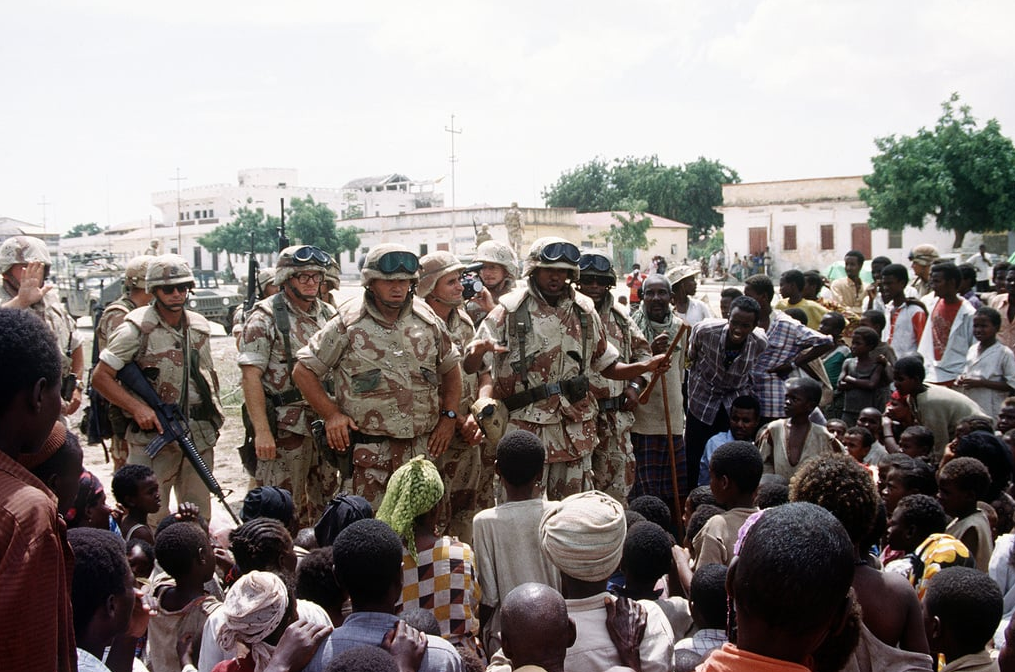
American Marine colonel addresses a group of Somalis with the aid of an interpreter in Mogadishu

According to an assessment by the Washington based independent NGO Refugee Policy Group, only 10,000 to 25,000 lives of the approximately 100,000 rescued by international assistance had been saved by the UNITAF and UNOSOM II interventions, and according to Professor Alex de Waal the true figure might have been even lower. Figures like Secretary-General Boutros-Ghali and American diplomat Chester Crocker claimed that the intervention saved a quarter of a million Somali lives, a claim which has been disputed by other observers who have noted that there is minimal evidence to suggest that UNITAF had had any significant impact on mortality.

No disarmament of the rivalling factions within Somalia was undertaken. This meant that the situation stayed stable only for the time UNITAF's overwhelming presence was deterring the fighting. Therefore, the mandate to create a "secure environment" was not achieved in a durable fashion. The Canadian Airborne Regiment was disbanded due to its conduct at UNITAF that was revealed during an investigation into the Somalia Affair.

== Transition to UNOSOM II ==
During March 1993, several weeks before UNOSOM II was created, the first UN sponsored Somali peace conference was being held in Addis Ababa, Ethiopia. The Conference on National Reconciliation consisted of the majority of Somalis factions and leaders. UN Special Representative Lansana Kouyate of Guinea warned the delegates of the national reconciliation conference that the UN was going to invoke its Chapter VII powers across the entirety of Somalia unless they came to an agreement by 25 March 1993. The conference finalized an agreement 24 hours past the deadline. On 26 March 1993 UNOSOM II, was established by the Security Council in Resolution 814, though did not formally take over operations in Somalia until UNITAF was dissolved just over a month later on 4 May 1993.

On 3 May 1993, UNOSOM II officially assumed command, and on 4 May 1993 it assumed responsibility for the operations. Despite UNOSOM II being composed of a coalition of twenty-seven countries, most of the decision makers were still Americans, giving the United States significant control over much of the operation. Marine Lt. Gen. Robert B. Johnston, head of UNITAF, would state that although in his view UNITAF had been success US efforts and losses would be in vain if UNOSOM II was also not successful. UNOSOM II Force Commander Cevik Bir openly admitted that the critical posts in his headquarters were staffed by Americans by May 1993, and it was observed that very few nations involved had any representation in the UN military command structure. In addition to this the representative of the UN Secretary-General in Somalia and head of UNOSOM II, retired US Admiral Jonathan Howe, staffed his headquarters with twenty-eight US officers in key positions. Months into the operation, following the 5 June 1993 killings of the Pakistanis and the passing of UNSCR 837, the US would effectively take lead of the mission.
