= United Nations Security Council Resolution 794 =

UN Security Council Resolution 794
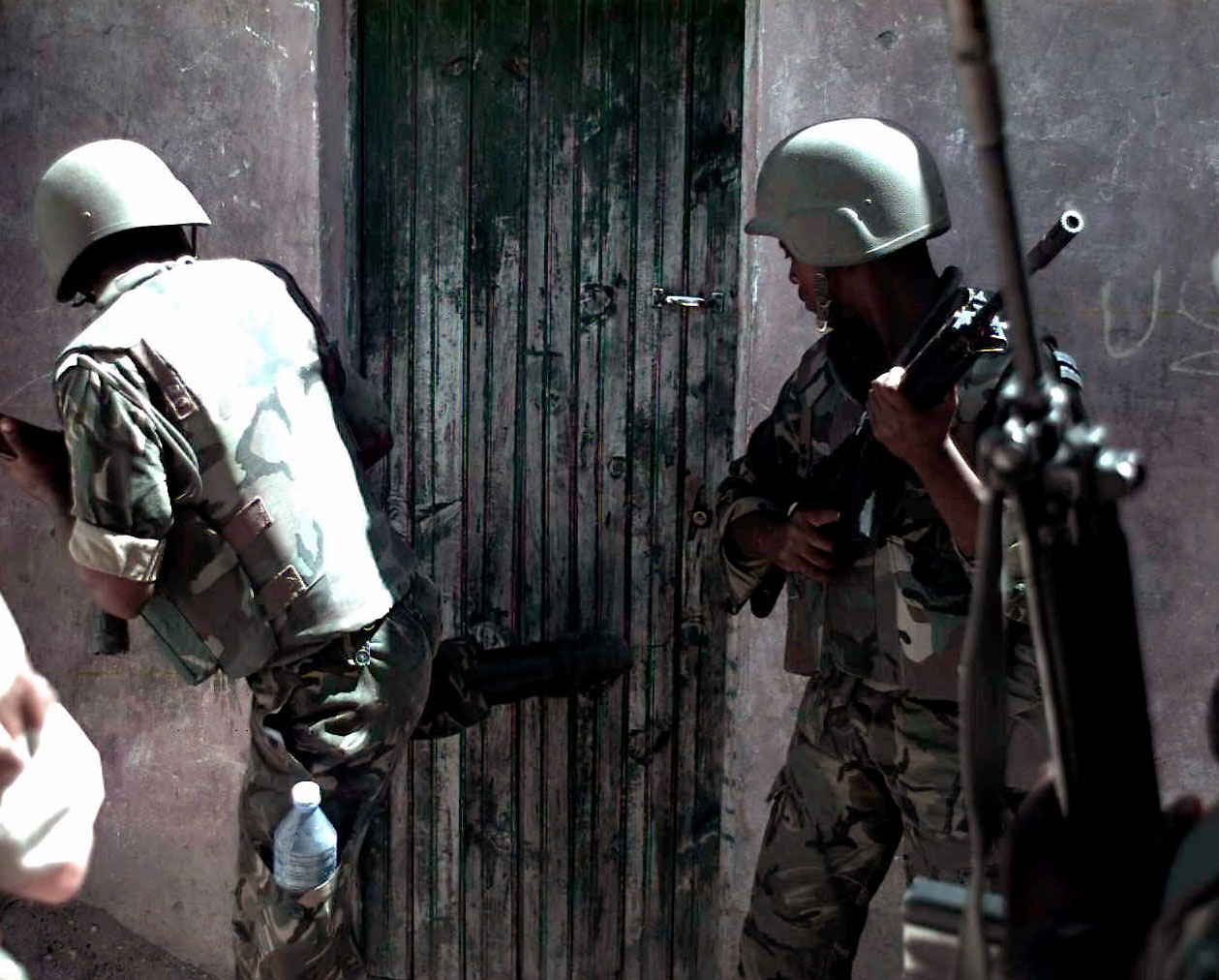
- Two Batswana soldiers conducting raids as part of UNITAF
- Date: 3 December 1992
- Meeting no.: 3,145
- Code: S/RES/794 (Document)
- Subject: Somalia
- Voting summary: 15 voted for; None voted against; None abstained
- Result: Adopted

Security Council composition
- Permanent members: China; France; Russia; United Kingdom; United States
- Non-permanent members: Austria; Belgium; Cape Verde; Ecuador; Hungary; India; Japan; Morocco; Venezuela; Zimbabwe

United Nations Security Council resolution 794, adopted unanimously on 3 December 1992, after reaffirming resolutions 733 (1992), 746 (1992), 751 (1992), 767 (1992) and 775 (1992), the Council "[expressed] grave alarm" regarding the situation in Somalia and authorised the creation of the Unified Task Force (UNITAF) to create a "secure environment for humanitarian relief operations in Somalia" in order to provide "essential for the survival of the civilian population". The current resolution determined that "the magnitude of human tragedy caused by the conflict in Somalia, further exacerbated by the obstacles being created to the distribution of humanitarian assistance [constitutes] a threat to international peace and security".

The Council once again, strongly condemned violations of international humanitarian law and demanded the cessation of all hostilities from all parties involved, urging them to co-operate with the Special Representative of the Secretary-General Boutros Boutros-Ghali and military, including allowing access by military personnel and humanitarian organisations to the affected population and to ensure their safety. It also authorised a further deployment of 3,500 personnel of the United Nations Operation in Somalia I (UNISOM I) created in Resolution 775 to Somalia and informing it should proceed at the discretion of the Secretary-General.

The resolution went on to endorse a recommendation by the Secretary-General that action should be taken under Chapter VII of the United Nations Charter and welcomed offers by Member States concerning the creation of an operation to create a secure environment for humanitarian operations, that later became known as UNITAF. At the time of his report, disarmament and the problem of security was not resolved. The Council authorised such action to be taken by Member States, and appointed an ad hoc commission composed of members of the Security Council to report on the implementation of the current resolution.

Acting under Chapter VII and Chapter VIII, the Council urged states and agencies to ensure strict implementation of the arms embargo against Somalia imposed in Resolution 733. Resolution 794 ended by requiring states participating in UNITAF and the Secretary-General to report regularly on the progress they are making in Somalia so that arrangements can be handed back over to UNISOM II.

Within days of passing the current resolution, on 9 December 1992, the first UNITAF troops arrived in the Somali capital, Mogadishu. It was the first Security Council resolution that authorised the use of force under Chapter VII to deliver humanitarian aid that was being obstructed by warlords, and the fourth major military engagement since the Cold War, following the invasion of Kuwait, the deployment of peacekeepers in Cambodia and a further deployment of peacekeepers in Yugoslavia.

== See also ==
- History of Somalia
- List of United Nations Security Council Resolutions 701 to 800 (1991–1993)
- Somali Civil War
