= United Nations Operation in Somalia I =

Failed UN efforts to ensure delivery of humanitarian aid to Somalia in early 1990s

- Abbreviation: UNOSOM I
- Formation: April 1992
- Type: Peacekeeping Mission
- Legal status: Completed
- Headquarters: Mogadishu, Somalia
- Special Representative of the Secretary-general (SRSG) Chief Military Observer: (Algeria) Mohamed Sahnoun April 1992 - November 1992 (Ba'athist Iraq) Ismat Kittani November 1992 - March 1993 (Pakistan) Brig. Gen. Imtiaz Shaheen June 1992 - March 1993 (United States) Jonathan T. Howe March 1993
- Parent organization: United Nations Security Council
- Website: Official site in English

United Nations Operation in Somalia I (UNOSOM I) was the first part of a United Nations (UN) sponsored effort to provide, facilitate, and secure humanitarian relief in Somalia, as well as to monitor the first UN-brokered ceasefire of the Somali Civil War conflict in the early 1990s.

The operation was established in April 1992 and ran until its duties were assumed by the Unified Task Force (UNITAF) mission in December 1992. Following the dissolution of UNITAF in May 1993, the subsequent UN mission in Somalia was known as UNOSOM II.

== Background ==
Somalia sits on the Horn of Africa at the Entrance of the Gulf of Aden and the Red Sea. Djibouti to the North, Ethiopia to the West and Kenya to the South provides its borders of approximately 8.5 million people, more than 98 percent are Somali giving it unusual ethnic homogeneity. More than 45 percent of the population are under 15 years of age. About 70 percent of Somalis are nomads who travel with their livestock herds through Somalia, Kenya, and Ethiopia. A lack of definite borders contributes to the unresolved land disputes between Somalia and its neighbors.

Following the eruption and escalation of the civil war in Somalia in 1991, the UN and the Organization of African Unity (OAU) intervened, citing the war and starvation. Of the Somali population of 10 million people, over half were in severe danger of starvation and malnutrition-related disease, mostly in the drought-stricken rural areas.

Another 1.5 million were judged at moderate risk of malnutrition. Three hundred thousand people died outright in the early months of 1992 and another 3 million fled the country as refugees.

The UN was engaged in Somalia from early in 1991 when the civil strife began. UN personnel were withdrawn on several occasions during sporadic flare-ups of violence. A series of Security Council resolutions (733, 746) and diplomatic visits eventually helped impose a ceasefire between the two key factions, signed at the end of March 1992. These efforts were aided by other international bodies, such as the Organisation for African Unity, the League of Arab States and the Organisation of the Islamic Conference.

== Creation ==
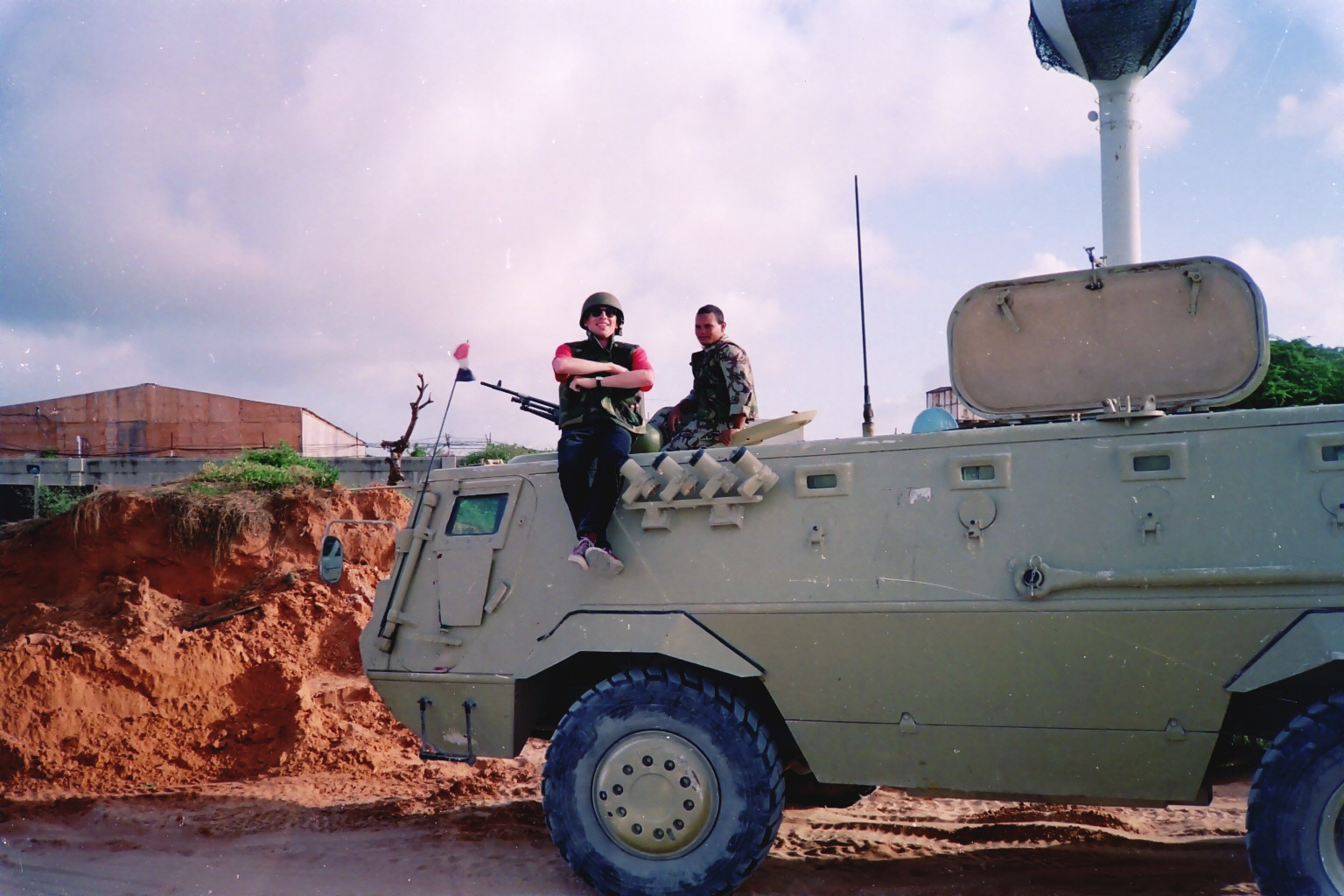
UNOSOM Egyptian Fahd 240 APC

The UN, with the active support of all rebel faction leaders, felt that some sort of peacekeeping force would be required to uphold the ceasefire and assist the humanitarian relief effort, in conjunction with other relief agencies and NGOs. By the end of April 1992, the Security Council adopted Resolution 751.

This provided for the establishment of a security force of 50 UN troops in Somalia to monitor the ceasefire. This detachment would be known as the United Nations Operation in Somalia (UNOSOM) and it existed at the consent of those parties who had been represented in the ceasefire.

The resolution also allowed for an expansion of the security force, with a number of around 500 troops initially discussed. The first group of ceasefire observers arrived in Mogadishu in early July 1992.

== Ineffectiveness ==
Despite the UN's efforts, all over Somalia the ceasefire was ignored, fighting continued, and continued to increase, putting the relief operations at great risk. The main parties to the ceasefire, General Mohamed Farrah Aidid and President Ali Mahdi Muhammad, once again showing the difficult and troubled relations between the warlords, proved to be difficult negotiating partners and continually frustrated attempts to move the peacekeepers and supplies.

In August 1992 the Security Council endorsed the sending of another 3,000 troops to the region to protect relief efforts. However, most of these troops were never sent.

Over the final quarter of 1992, the situation in Somalia continued to get worse. Factions in Somalia were splintering into smaller factions and splintering again. Agreements for food distribution with one party were worthless when the stores had to be shipped through the territory of another.

Some elements were actively opposing the UNOSOM intervention. Troops were shot at, aid ships attacked and prevented from docking, cargo aircraft were fired upon and aid agencies, public and private, were subject to threats, robbery and extortion. Meanwhile, hundreds, if not thousands of poverty stricken refugees were starving to death every day. An infamous example transpired on the 23rd of February 1993, Timothy Montague Hamilton Douglas, a junior aide, was menaced by a crowd of Somali militia men over a perceived slight regarding an electrical generator contract that was initially supposed to be purchased from the Habar-Gidir before supply issues and delays meant it would be more prudent for it to be supplied by the Digil. The crowd had to be dispersed by a contingent of UN peacekeepers at the field office in the Black Sea quarter of Mogadishu, impacting the local Somali community even further.

By November 1992, General Mohamed Farrah Aidid had grown confident enough to formally defy the Security Council and demand the withdrawal of peace keepers, as well as declaring hostile intent against any further UN deployments.

== Transition to UNITAF and UNOSOM II ==
In November 1992, the United States of America offered to establish a multinational force under its own leadership to secure the humanitarian operation. This offer was accepted by the Security Council, and what became known as the Unified Task Force (UNITAF) was authorized to utilize "all necessary means" to ensure the protection of the relief efforts.

Accordingly, the Security Council suspended any further significant strengthening of UNOSOM as UN affairs in Somalia were subsumed by UNITAF (also known to Americans as Operation Restore Hope). With only a handful of the 3,000 plus troops envisaged for UNOSOM ever put in place, the Security Council left it to “the discretion of the Secretary General” as to what should be done with the abortive mission.

UNITAF was composed of forces from 24 different countries, with the vast bulk contributed by the United States. UNITAF soon secured the relief operations which were being coordinated and carried out by UNOSOM, which was also attempting to negotiate a political end to the conflict. Indeed, although UNOSOM had been replaced by UNITAF, it was technically still in operation and would remain ready to resume its function when UNITAF had met its goals of creating a secure environment for humanitarian relief.

The Secretary-General convened a meeting in early 1993 in which 14 important Somalia political and rebel factions agreed to hand over all of their weapons to UNITAF and UNOSOM, and over $130 million was pledged by donors at an aid conference that year to assist in reconstruction. However, Somalia continued the stumble, and in March the UN decided to transform the UNITAF mission into what came to be known as UNOSOM II. The mandate of UNOSOM II stipulated that the operation was to secure continued relief efforts and, more significantly, to restore peace and rebuild the Somali state and economy.

== Statistics ==
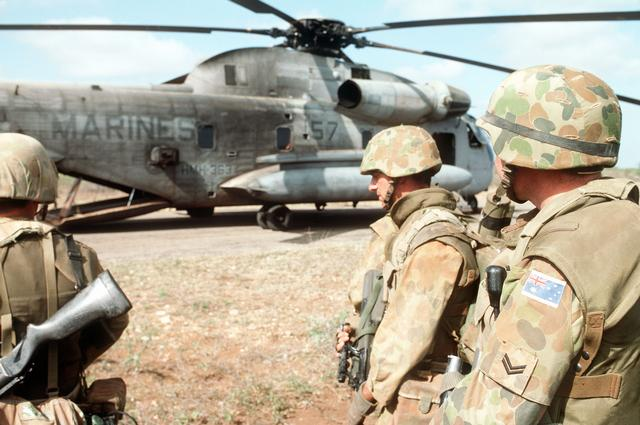
Australian soldiers prepare to board a US Marine Corps helicopter in Somalia

In the few months of its operation, 54 military observers and 893 military personnel served with UNOSOM I, supported by international civilian and local staff. The mission suffered six fatalities. Contributing nations were: Australia, Austria, Belgium, Canada, Czech Republic, Egypt, Fiji, Finland, Indonesia, Jordan, Morocco, New Zealand, Norway, Pakistan, Botswana and Zimbabwe.

== See also ==
- Operation Provide Relief
- Operation United Shield
- UNITAF
- UNOSOM II
