= United Nations Security Council Resolution 775 =

UN Security Council Resolution 775
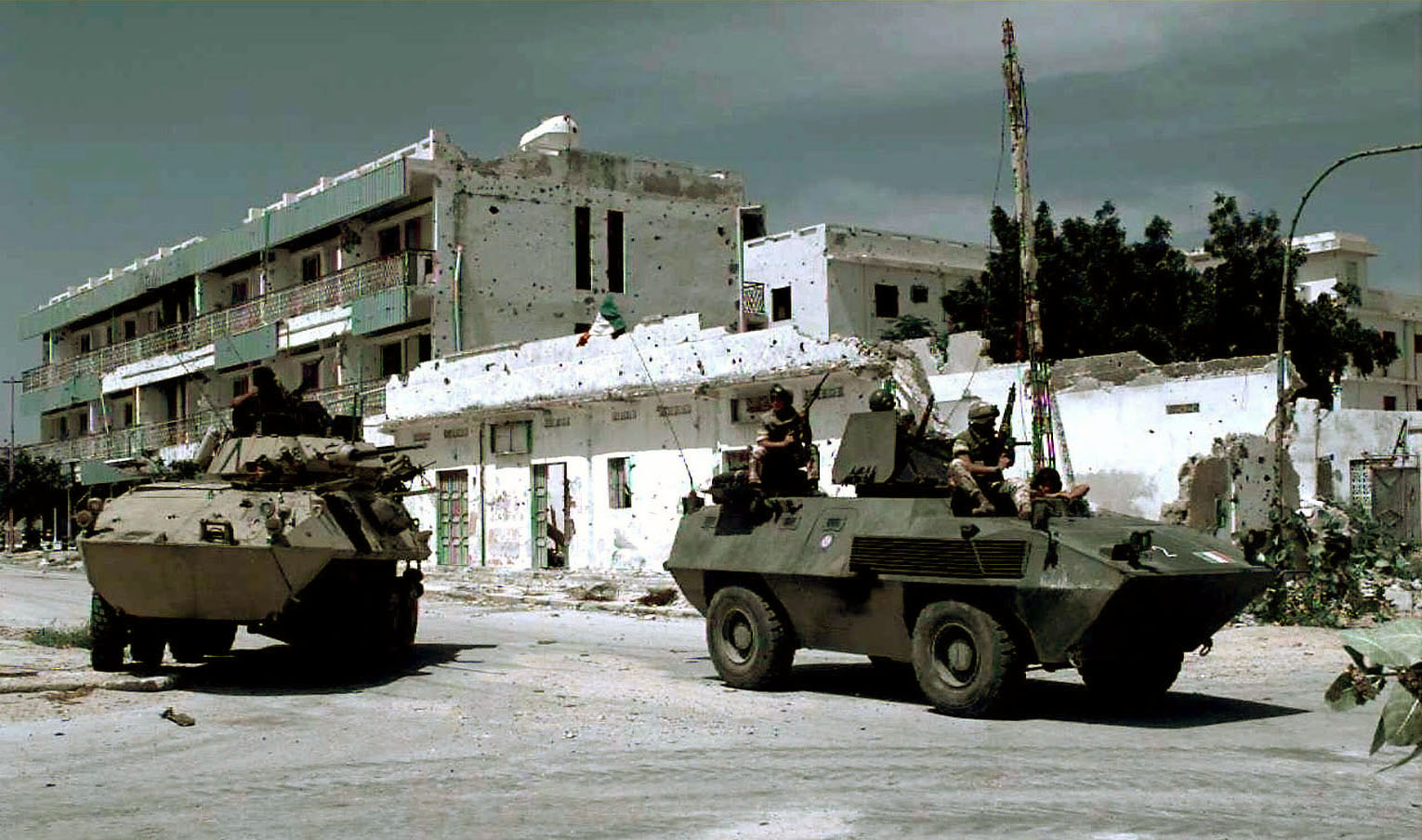
- American and Italian forces in Mogadishu
- Date: 28 August 1992
- Meeting no.: 3,110
- Code: S/RES/775 (Document)
- Subject: Somalia
- Voting summary: 15 voted for; None voted against; None abstained
- Result: Adopted

Security Council composition
- Permanent members: China; France; Russia; United Kingdom; United States
- Non-permanent members: Austria; Belgium; Cape Verde; Ecuador; Hungary; India; Japan; Morocco; Venezuela; Zimbabwe

United Nations Security Council resolution 775, adopted unanimously on 28 August 1992, after reaffirming resolutions 733 (1992), 746 (1992), 751 (1992) and 767 (1992) considering a report by the Secretary-General Boutros Boutros-Ghali on the ongoing civil war in Somalia, the Council decided to increase the strength of the United Nations Operation in Somalia I by an additional 3,000 personnel.

The council also went on to approve the establishment of four zones in Somalia: the northwest (Berbera), northeast (Bossasso), central lands and the capital Mogadishu. In each zone, humanitarian assistance would be given by the United Nations, in addition to monitoring the ceasefire and maintaining security by helping the Somali factions to disarm. It also welcomed the decision by the Secretary-General to increase airlifts, as well as contributions from Member States, while urging co-operation from the parties and factions in Somalia with United Nations personnel throughout.

The resolution also called for strict monitoring of the ceasefire, called for the support of parties in Somalia to help facilitate the delivery of humanitarian aid, and called on the Arab League, Organisation of African Unity and Organisation of the Islamic Conference to help seek a comprehensive solution to the conflict.

According to Boutros-Ghali, the current resolution indicated that the Security Council "finally decided to take firmer action", even though enforcement was not yet included in the mandate. Permission from the Somalia government for the additional personnel was not sought as there was no functioning government. In September, the first troops began to arrive.

== See also ==
- History of Somalia
- List of United Nations Security Council Resolutions 701 to 800 (1991–1993)
- Somali Civil War
