= United Nations Security Council Resolution 767 =

UN Security Council Resolution 767
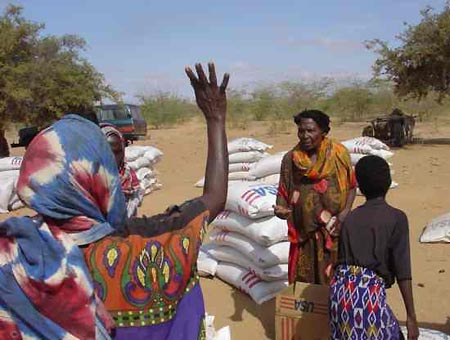
- Aid being distributed in Somalia
- Date: 24 July 1992
- Meeting no.: 3,101
- Code: S/RES/767 (Document)
- Subject: Somalia
- Voting summary: 15 voted for; None voted against; None abstained
- Result: Adopted

Security Council composition
- Permanent members: China; France; Russia; United Kingdom; United States
- Non-permanent members: Austria; Belgium; Cape Verde; Ecuador; Hungary; India; Japan; Morocco; Venezuela; Zimbabwe

United Nations Security Council resolution 767, adopted unanimously on 24 July 1992, after reaffirming resolutions 733 (1992), 746 (1992) and 751 (1992), the Council noted the ongoing humanitarian efforts in Somalia by the United Nations and the deteriorating political situation in the country.

The council requested the Secretary-General Boutros Boutros-Ghali to make full use of all available means, including an urgent airlift operation, in accelerating and facilitating the provision of humanitarian aid to the affected population in Somalia who were at risk of mass starvation. It also requested relevant parties, factions in movements in Somalia to help facilitate the humanitarian efforts by guaranteeing the safety and freedom of movement of humanitarian workers as well as assisting in the general stabilisation of the country. The resolution repeated similar demands applying to military observers of the United Nations Operation in Somalia I.

The council then discussed issues relating to a ceasefire and cessation of hositilies, urging all parties, factions and movements concerned to cease fighting, requesting the Secretary-General to promote such a ceasefire. It welcomed co-operation by the Arab League, Organisation of the Islamic Conference and Organisation of African Unity in attempting to resolve the situation, but also stressed the continuing need to enforce the arms embargo on Somalia in place since Resolution 733.

Finally, Resolution 767 supported the Secretary-General's decision to dispatch a technical team under direction of the Special Representative, affirming that all United Nations officials enjoy the privileges and immunities in accordance with the Convention on the Privileges and Immunities of the United Nations, further supporting his efforts to convene a national conference on reconciliation. It did not authorise additional military personnel to the region, but stated that it did not "exclude other measures to deliver humanitarian assistance to Somalia."

== See also ==
- History of Somalia
- List of United Nations Security Council Resolutions 701 to 800 (1991–1993)
- Somali Civil War
