= United Nations Security Council Resolution 751 =

UN Security Council Resolution 751
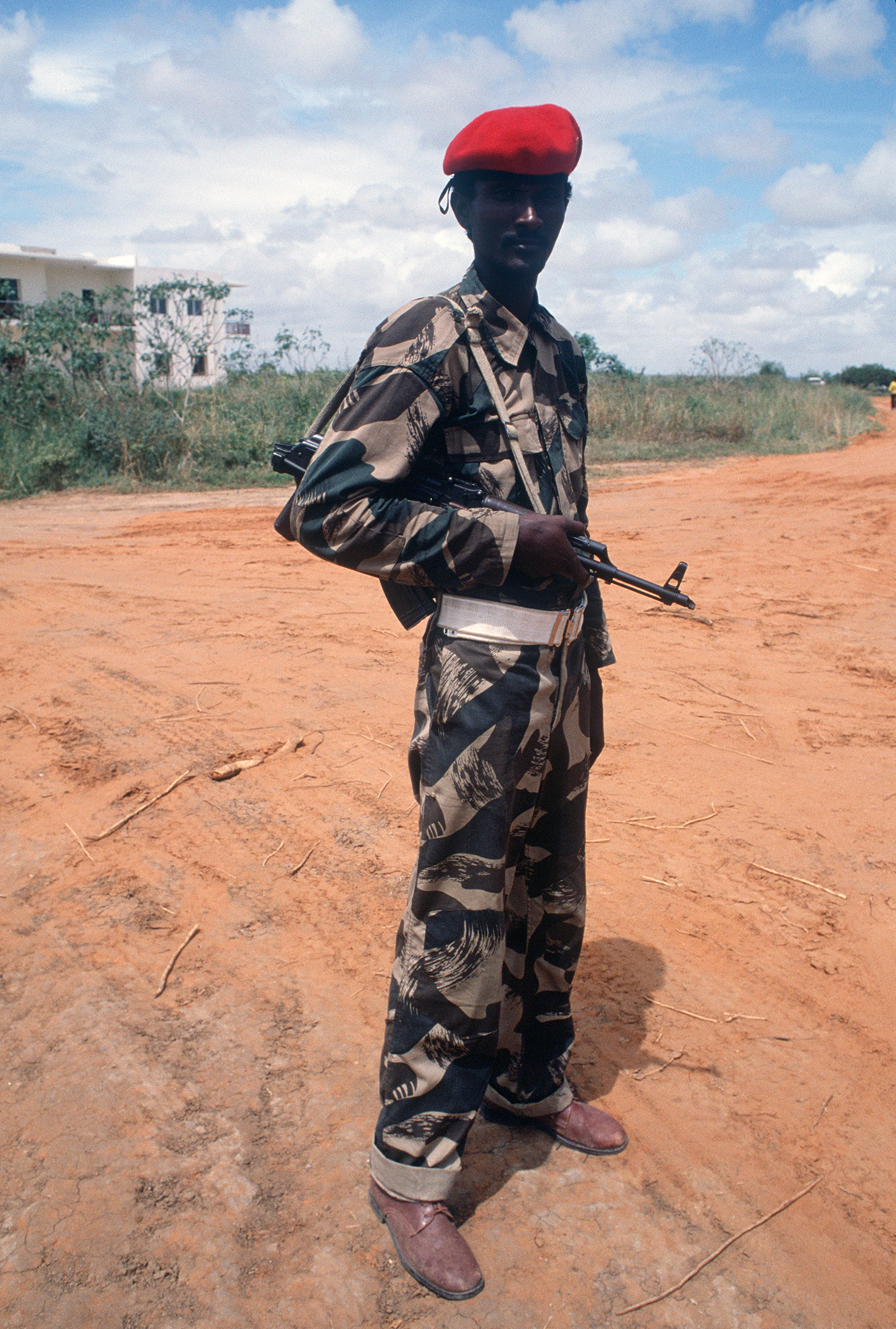
- Equipped Somali National Army soldier
- Date: 24 April 1992
- Meeting no.: 3,069
- Code: S/RES/751 (Document)
- Subject: Somalia
- Voting summary: 15 voted for; None voted against; None abstained
- Result: Adopted

Security Council composition
- Permanent members: China; France; Russia; United Kingdom; United States
- Non-permanent members: Austria; Belgium; Cape Verde; Ecuador; Hungary; India; Japan; Morocco; Venezuela; Zimbabwe

United Nations Security Council resolution 751 is a United Nations Security Council resolution adopted unanimously on 24 April 1992, after reaffirming resolutions 733 (1992) and 746 (1992) and considering a report by the Secretary-General Boutros Boutros-Ghali on the ongoing civil war in Somalia. The council established a United Nations Operation in Somalia I with an immediate deployment of 50 observers in the capital Mogadishu to monitor the ceasefire.

The Council went on to establish, in principle, a security force under the direction of the newly created post, the Special Representative of the Secretary-General in Somalia, and requested further consultations on the proposed force. It also asked the Secretary-General to facilitate an immediate cessation of hostilities and an observance of a ceasefire throughout the country to promote the process of reconciliation and to provide humanitarian aid. The resolution also welcomed the efforts of the Arab League, Organisation of African Unity and Organisation of the Islamic Conference in Somalia and called for a conference with the aforementioned, the Secretary-General and factions in Somalia.

Resolution 751 also established a Committee of the Security Council to oversee a general and complete arms embargo against Somalia, including seeking information from individual states on measures taken by them and making recommendations on improving the effectiveness of the embargo and with states that violate it. It ended by calling for co-operation at all levels to find a peaceful settlement in the country.

The embargo has been varied by Security Council resolutions over the years to allow journalists to import flak jackets and helmets for their personal use and for the African Union to establish an armed presence.

A Panel of Experts to investigate the lack of success of the arms embargo was set up in 2002. Its report resulted in the establishment of a Monitoring Group. The Monitoring Group report detailed numerous shipments of arms, sometimes with the help of pirates or sourced from government stockpiles in nearby countries. Donor money has been found to have funded the imports.

In 2008, the embargo was in relation to nations and the International Maritime Organization providing technical assistance to Somalia upon their request to enhance the capacity to ensure coastal and maritime security, including combating piracy off the Somali coast.

== See also ==
- History of Somalia
- List of United Nations Security Council Resolutions 701 to 800 (1991–1993)
- Somali Civil War
