= United Nations Security Council Resolution 746 =

UN Security Council Resolution 746
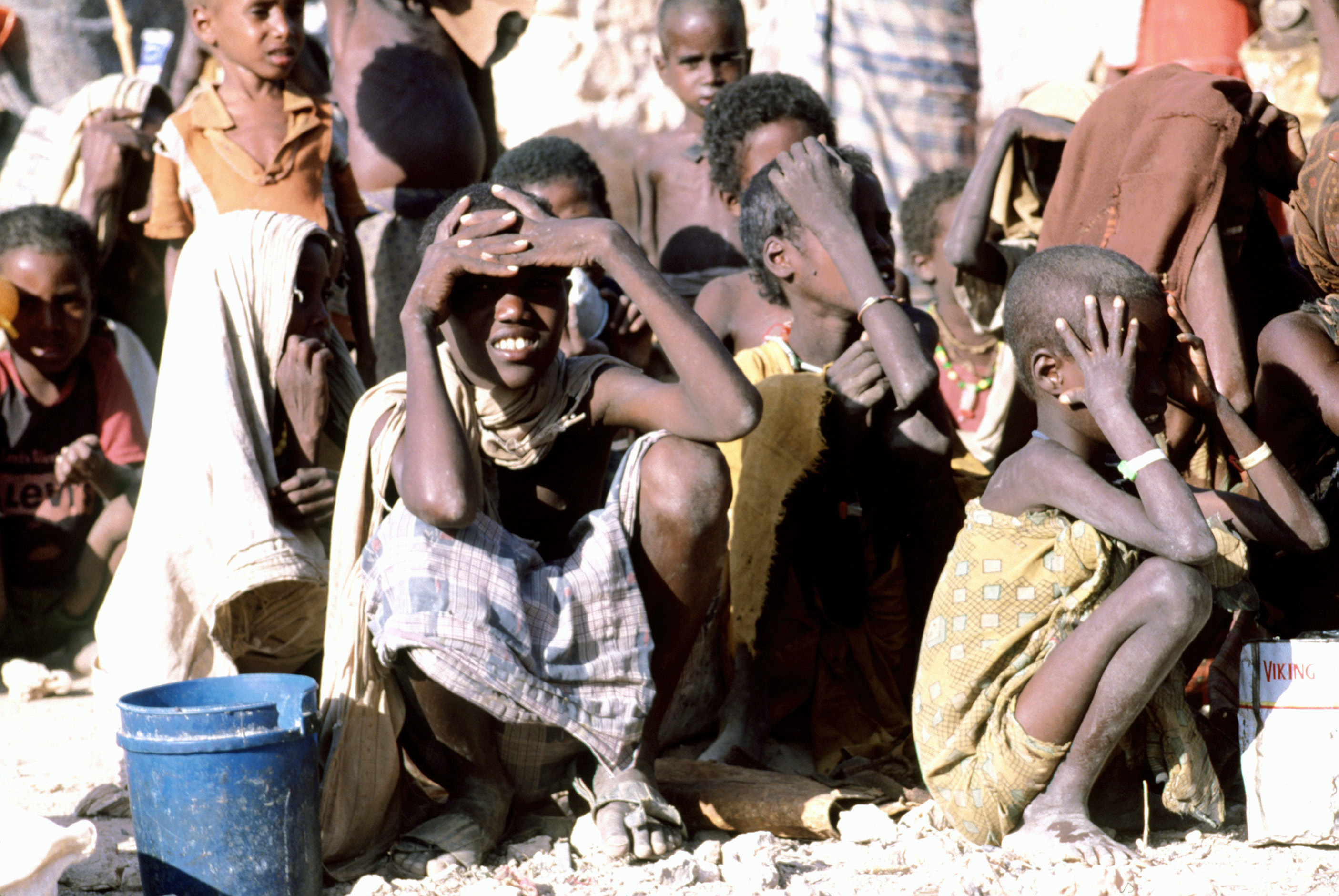
- Somali children waiting for aid (1992)
- Date: 17 March 1992
- Meeting no.: 3,060
- Code: S/RES/746 (Document)
- Subject: Somalia
- Voting summary: 15 voted for; None voted against; None abstained
- Result: Adopted

Security Council composition
- Permanent members: China; France; Russia; United Kingdom; United States
- Non-permanent members: Austria; Belgium; Cape Verde; Ecuador; Hungary; India; Japan; Morocco; Venezuela; Zimbabwe

United Nations Security Council resolution 746, adopted unanimously on 17 March 1992, after reaffirming Resolution 733 (1992), noting a ceasefire agreement in Mogadishu and a report by the Secretary-General, the Council urged the continuation of the United Nations humanitarian work in Somalia and strongly supported the Secretary-General's decision to dispatch a technical team there.

The Council urged the Somali factions to uphold the ceasefire agreement of 3 March 1992, further asking them to co-operate with the Secretary-General, the United Nations and international organisations to facilitate the delivery of humanitarian aid to those in need. It also supported his decision to dispatch a technical team to Somalia that would establish mechanisms for aid delivery and called on Somali factions to respect the safety and security of the team.

Finally, Resolution 746 encouraged co-operation between the Organisation of African Unity, Arab League and Organisation of the Islamic Conference and Secretary-General with the hope of convening a conference for national reconciliation and unity in Somalia.

== See also ==
- History of Somalia
- List of United Nations Security Council Resolutions 701 to 800 (1991–1993)
- Somali Civil War
