= Jagdeep (name) =

Jagdeep is a name. People with the name include:

- Jagdeep
- Jagdeep Sidhu
- Jagdeep Dhankhar
- Jagdeep Kamboj Goldy
- Jagdeep Smart
- Jagdeep Singh

== See also ==
- Jagdeep filmography
