= United Nations Operation in Somalia II =

Second phase of UN military intervention in Somalia

- Part of the Somali Civil War
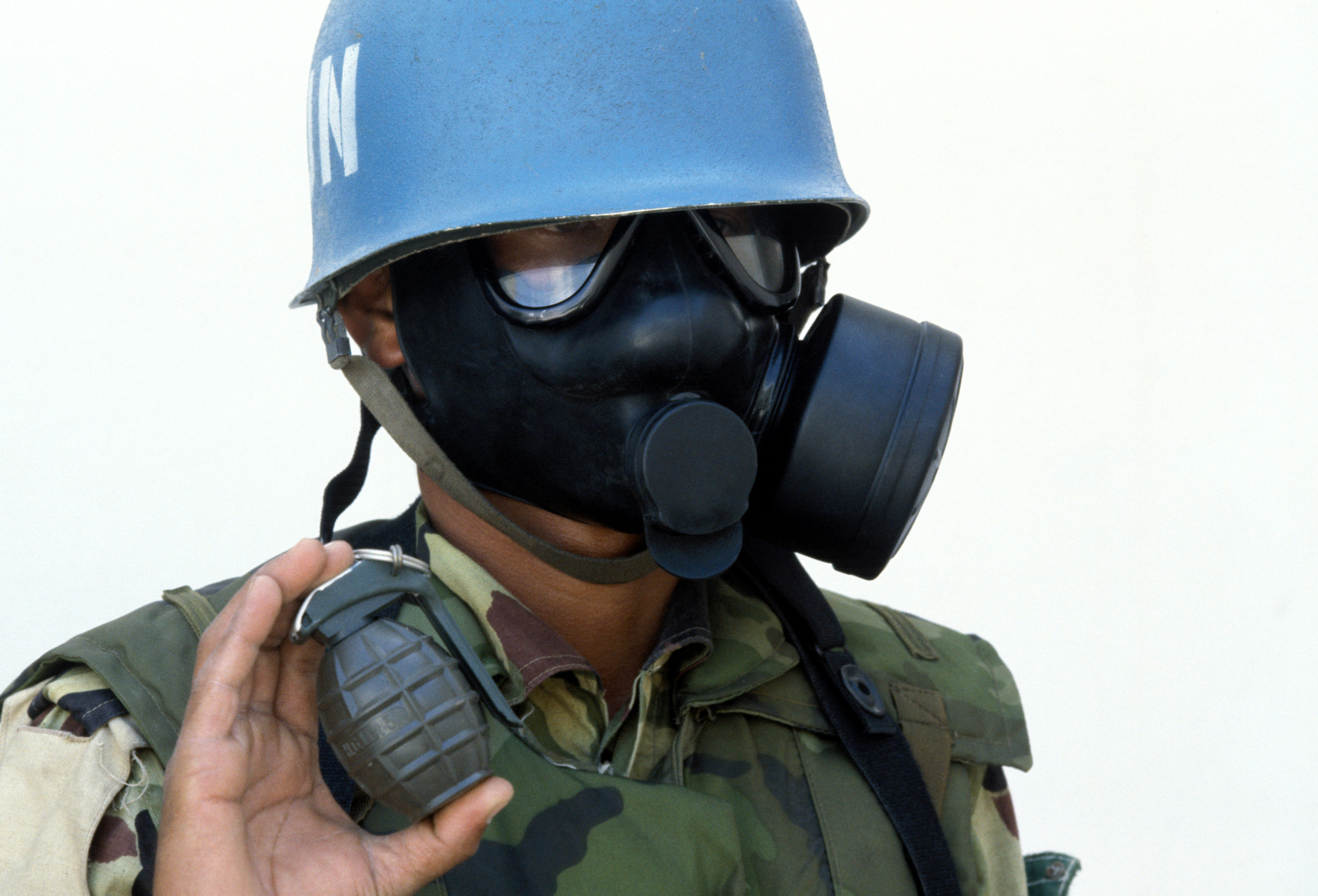
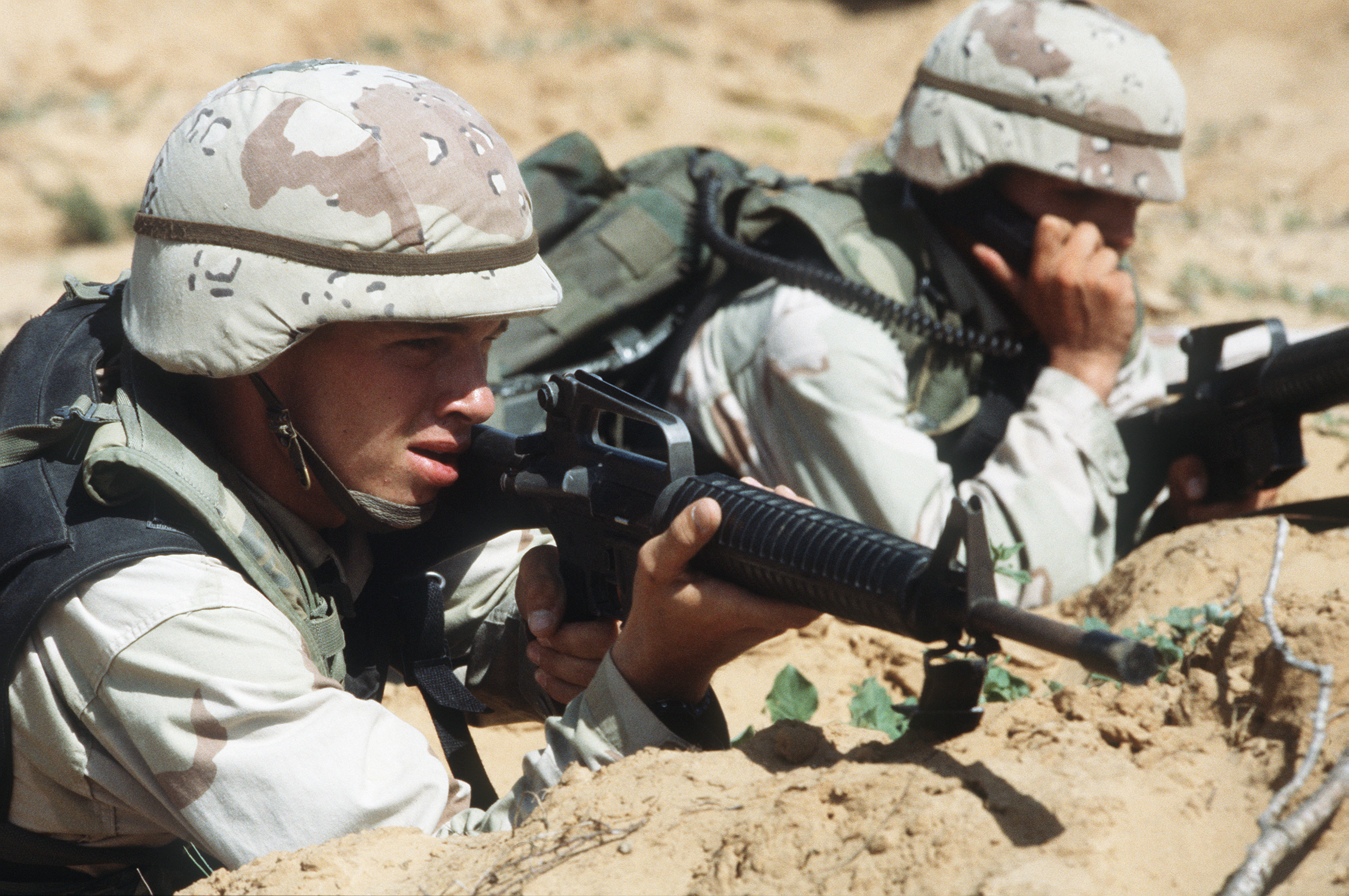
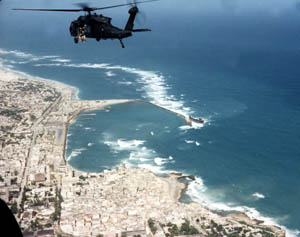
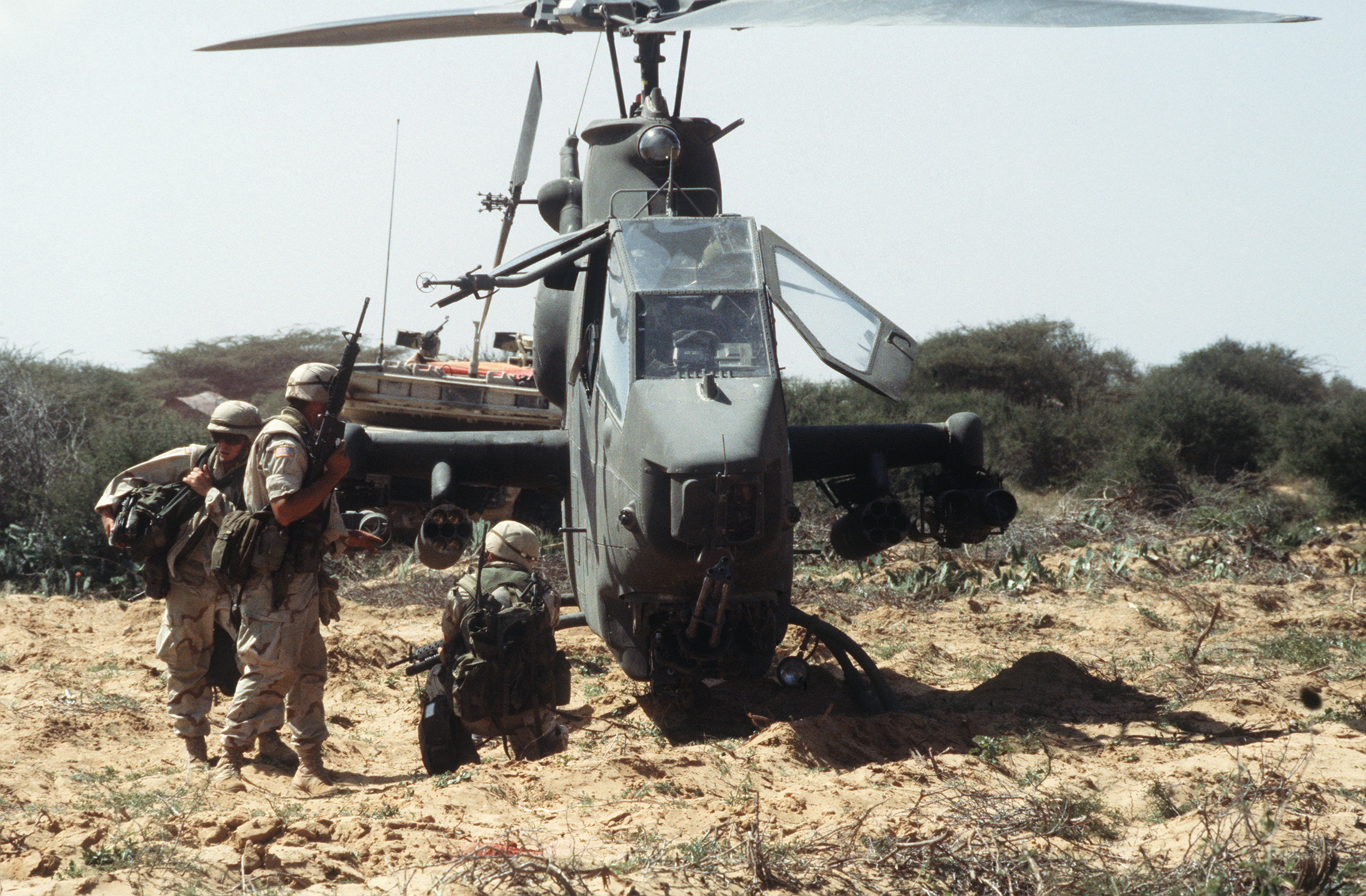
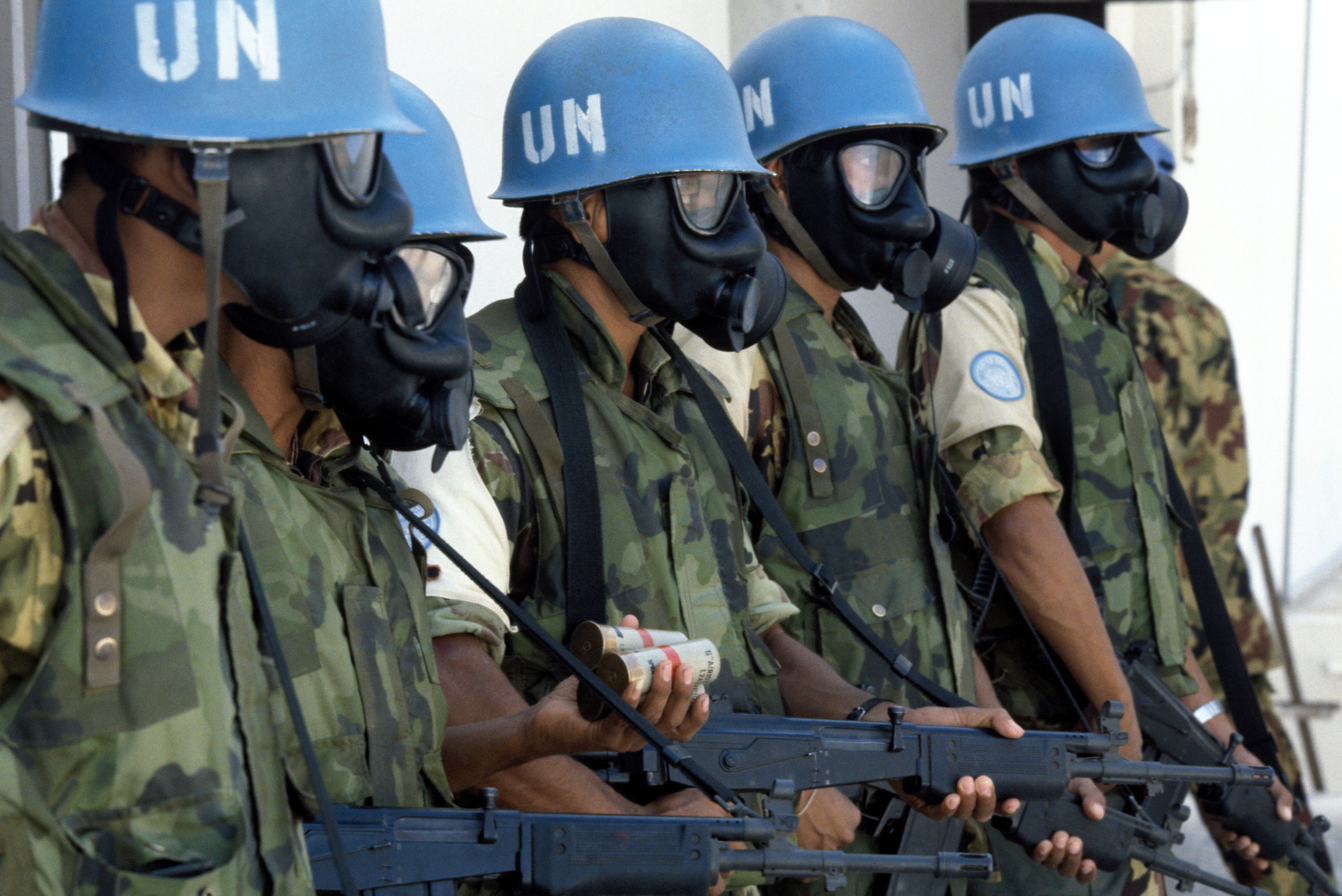
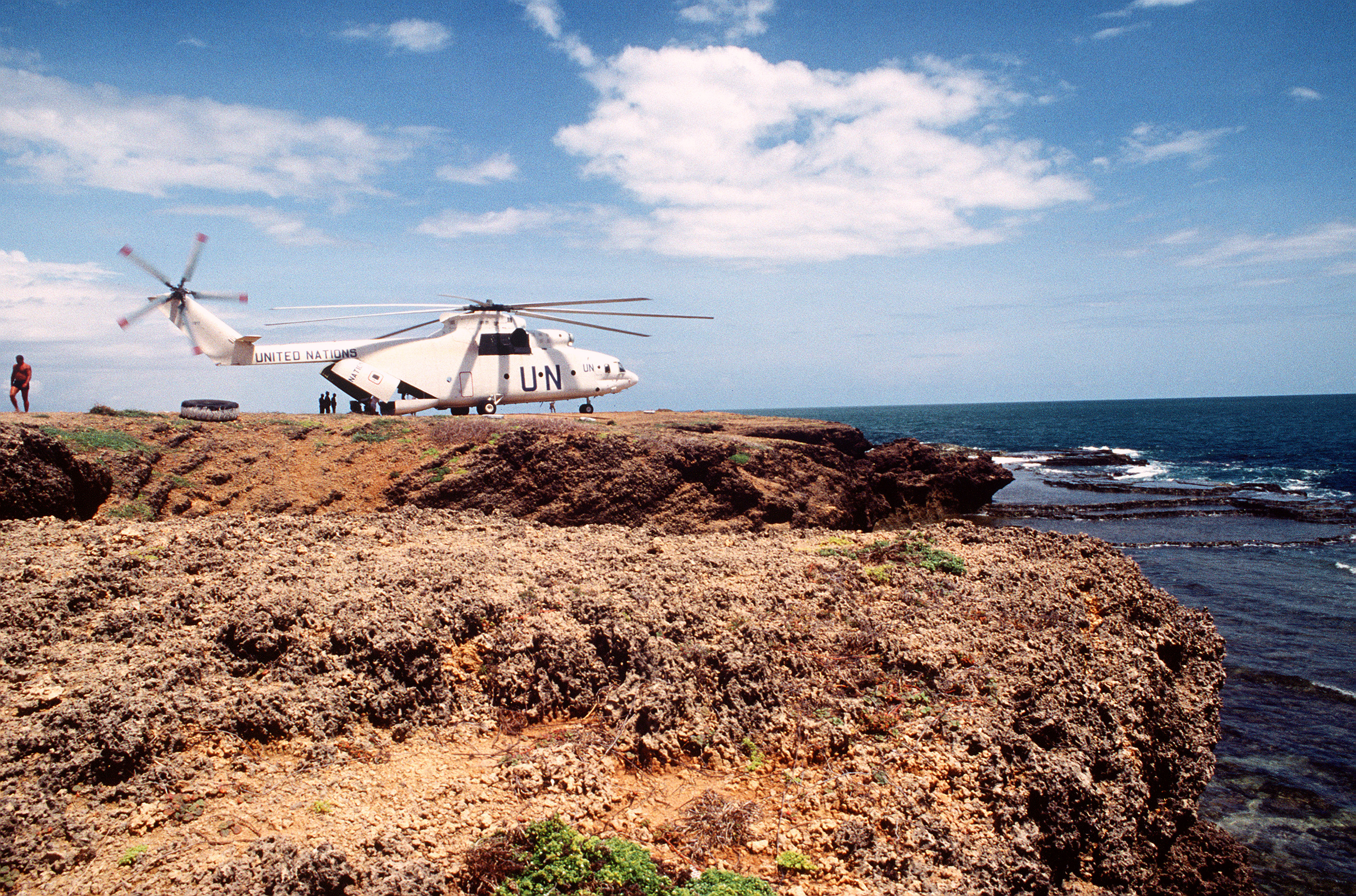
- Clockwise from top left: UNOSOM II soldier displays grenade; US troops on downed aircraft recovery exercise; US AH-1 Cobra during military exercise; UN Mi-26 in Kismayo; UNOSOM QRF troops; Black Hawk over Mogadishu
Date	26 March 1993 – 28 March 1995 (2 years and 2 days)
Location	Somalia
Result	UNOSOM II failure: Somali National Alliance induces UNOSOM II withdrawal

Belligerents
United Nations: Algeria; Australia; Austria; Belgium; Botswana; Canada; Denmark; Egypt; Fiji; Finland; France; Germany; Greece; India; Indonesia; Ireland; Italy; Jordan; Kuwait; Malaysia; Morocco; Nepal; New Zealand; Nigeria; Norway; Pakistan; Philippines; Romania; Saudi Arabia; South Korea; Spain; Sweden; Switzerland; Tunisia; Turkey; United States; Zimbabwe	(Somalia) Somali National Alliance; Al-Itihaad al-Islamiya (Somalia) Somali National Front

Commanders and leaders
(United Nations) Boutros Boutros-Ghali (United States) Jonathan Howe (Turkey) Çevik Bir (United States) Tom Montgomery (United States) Bill Garrison (Malaysia) Aboo Samah Bin Aboo Bakar	(Somalia) Mohamed Farrah Aidid (Somalia) Said Hersi Morgan; Hassan Dahir Aweys

Strength
30,000 personnel, including 22,000 troops and 8,000 logistic and civilian staff	Unknown

Casualties and losses
Approx. 385 casualties, including 134–154 killed (United States) 26 killed, 170 wounded (Pakistan) 24 killed (India) 12 killed (Nigeria) 7 killed (Italy) 5 killed (Malaysia) 1 killed (Belgium) 1 killed	Approx. 2,000–13,000 casualties (Somali insurgents and civilians) 2,000 casualties (Per. Peterson); 6,000–10,000 casualties (Several estimates); 13,000 casualties (Per. Aidid)

The United Nations Operation in Somalia II (UNOSOM II) was the second phase of the United Nations intervention in Somalia and took place from March 1993 until March 1995, following the outbreak of the Somali Civil War in 1991. UNOSOM II carried on from the transitory United States-controlled (UN-sanctioned) Unified Task Force (UNITAF), which had been preceded by UNOSOM I. Notably, UNOSOM II embarked on a nation-building mission, diverging from its predecessors. As delineated in UNSCR 814, the operation's objectives were to aid in relief provision and economic rehabilitation, foster political reconciliation, and re-establish political and civil administrations across Somalia.

UNOSOM II was a substantial multinational initiative, uniting over 22,000 troops from 27 nations. This operation marked the largest multilateral force ever assembled for peacekeeping, and at that time, it was the costliest UN operation. The operation abandoned the careful rules of engagement set by UNITAF, and notably was the first UN mission authorized from the start to use military force proactively, beyond self-defense.

Four months into its mandate in June 1993, UNOSOM II transformed into a military campaign as it found itself entangled in armed conflict with Somali factions, predominantly against the Somali National Alliance (SNA) led by Gen. Mohammed Farah Aidid. As the intervention progressed, military operations against the SNA took focus, relegating the task of political reconciliation, institution-building and humanitarian aid to a peripheral role. Three months into the conflict, the US military implemented Operation Gothic Serpent to assist UNOSOM II against the SNA with special forces. Soon after, the infamous Battle of Mogadishu took place, signifying the end of the hunt for Aidid and military operations in Somalia. The United States withdrew six months after the battle, and the remaining UN forces departed from Somalia in early 1995, concluding the operation.

UNOSOM II faced heavy criticism for human rights abuses, violations of international law, and the use of excessive force, attracting scrutiny from a wide range of humanitarian organizations, academics and journalists. Furthermore, the operation was widely criticized for an overemphasis on military operations, diverging from its original humanitarian intent. The humanitarian impact and number of lives saved is disputed.

== Background ==
1991 saw the outbreak of the full-scale Somali Civil War, which led to the collapse of the Somali Democratic Republic. The following year, a famine emerged, driven by both a major drought and the major fighting that engulfed the nation’s breadbasket in the southern regions.

The United Nations created the UNOSOM I mission in April 1992 in response to the crisis. During July 1992 the first UN troops landed in Somalia, seven Pakistani military troops under the command of Brigadier-General Imtiaz Shaheen. In August 1992, UNOSOM I head Mohammed Sahnoun secured an agreement with Mohamed Farah Aidid of the Somali National Alliance (SNA) to allow 500 UN peacekeepers, with the condition that any further deployments required SNA approval. However, later that month, UN Secretary-General Boutros Ghali announced plans to expand UNOSOM to 3,500 troops without consultation, to the surprise of both Sahnoun and the SNA. Sahnoun recognized this move would undermine his local support, as it had been made without consulting Somali leaders and elders. He attempted to delay the deployment in order to renegotiate but was overruled. The intervention began fueling nationalist opposition to foreign troops, strengthening support for Aidid’s SNA, which condemned the UN’s perceived colonial practices.

The UN Secretariat believed Somalia represented an ideal candidate for a test case of a UN operation in expanded size and mandate. In the view of some top UNOSOM I commanders, the scope of the famine in Somalia was being exaggerated in order to justify using Somalia as an experiment for 'conflict resolution'. The United States had various motives for military involvement in Somalia. The US armed forces wanted to prove it's capability to conduct major 'Operations Other Than War', while the US State Department wanted to set a precedent for humanitarian military intervention in the post-Cold War era.

On 9 December 1992, American troops began landing on the Somali coastline at Mogadishu. Over 20,000 US troops were deployed. The famine in Somalia was already abating as UNITAF began landing. The operations of UNOSOM I were suspended. UNITAF was authorized under Chapter VII of the UN Charter. The United States designed the UNITAF mission to be a transitional action under U.S. control, structured into four phases. Initially, troops were deployed to secure key harbor and airport sites in Mogadishu and Baledogle, forming the operation's base. The security zone was then extended to encompass the surrounding regions of southern Somalia. The third phase involved further southern expansion of the security zone into Kismayo and Bardera while ensuring secure routes for humanitarian operations. Finally, in the last phase the U.S. transferred operations to the UN and withdrew most UNITAF forces.

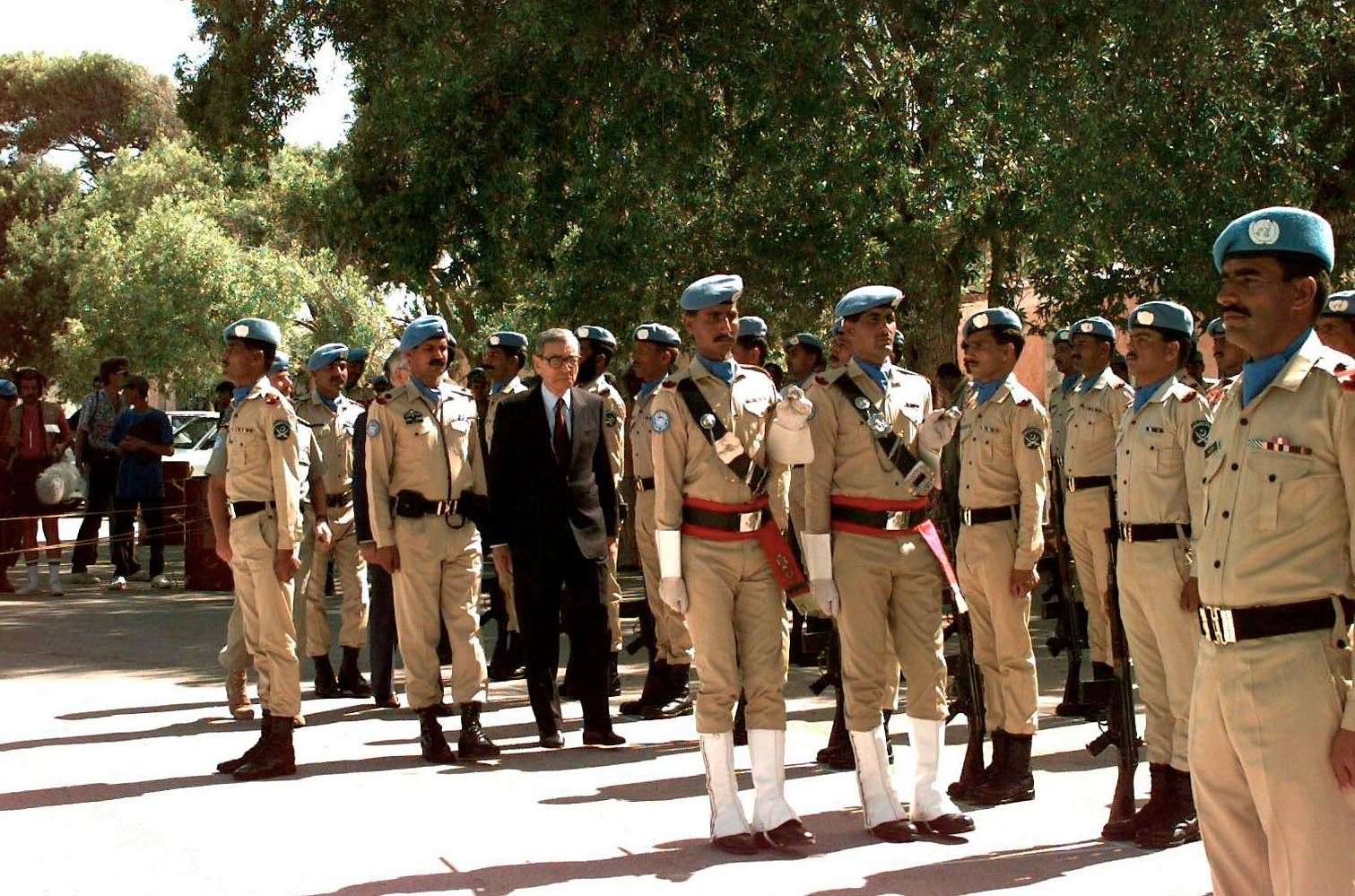
United Nations Secretary General Boutros Boutros-Ghali reviewing Pakistani Army UNITAF forces in Mogadishu

=== Expansion of mandate ===
On 3 March 1993, the Secretary-General submitted to the Security Council his recommendations for effecting the transition from UNITAF to UNOSOM II. He noted that despite the size of the UNITAF mission, a secure environment was not yet established. There was still no effective functioning government or local security/police force. The Secretary-General concluded that, should the Security Council determine that the time had come for the transition from UNITAF to UNOSOM II, the latter should be endowed with enforcement powers under Chapter VII of the United Nations Charter to establish a secure environment throughout Somalia. UNOSOM II would therefore seek to complete the task begun by UNITAF. The new mandate would also empower UNOSOM II to assist in rebuilding their economic, political and social life, so as to recreate a Somali State. Most notably it would also mandate the disarmament of Somali militias.

While Somalia was not reincorporated into a UN trusteeship as it had been in the 1950s, UNOSOM II was entrusted with the power to make decisions on behalf of the Somali people. This significant shift in mandate incited numerous allegations of UN colonialism. The United Nations, by invoking Chapter VII, essentially transformed the scope of its operations in Somalia, a move that would become a major point of contention in the near future. According to UNOSOM II advisor John Drysdale the majority of Somali political leaders rejected the notion of UN administering any aspect of Somalia, though some prominent figures such as Gen. Mohamed Abshir called for the return of trusteeship. The shift raised suspicions among a wide spectrum of Somalis, inciting concerns about the UN's possible attempts to reestablish a trusteeship. Aidid's faction was particularly vocal about these apprehensions but was not alone. A variety of other Somali factions, including that of Aidid's main adversary, Ali Mahdi, also expressed similar concerns.

=== Addis Ababa Reconciliation Conference and creation of UNOSOM II ===
During March 1993, several weeks before UNOSOM II was created, the first UN sponsored Somali peace conference was being held in Addis Ababa, Ethiopia. The Conference on National Reconciliation consisted of the majority of Somalis factions and leaders. UN Special Representative Lansana Kouyate of Guinea warned the delegates of the national reconciliation conference that the UN was going to invoke its Chapter VI powers across the entirety of Somalia unless they came to an agreement by 25 March 1993. The conference finalized an agreement 24 hours past the deadline. On 26 March 1993 UNOSOM II, was established by the Security Council in Resolution 814, though did not formally take over operations in Somalia until UNITAF was dissolved just over a month later on 4 May 1993.

UNOSOM II was the first UN mission authorized from the start to use military force proactively, beyond self-defense. John Drysdale notes that by invoking Chapter VII, the UNOSOM II Force Commander could operate with near impunity depending on their interpretation of Article 42 of Chapter VII. Article 42 offered no rules of engagement, in effect gave UNOSOM II forces the power to make arbitrary detentions and offer no right to habeas corpus for Somalis. In Drysdale's view UNITAF had avoided armed conflict with Somali factions due to the careful rules of engagement created by the head of the operation, US Marine Lt. Gen. Robert B. Johnston. Johnston's approach, which focused above all on winning the Somali's public confidence, was lost during the transfer to the far more aggressive UNOSOM II mandate.

== Structure ==
UNOSOM II was composed of four main divisions. They were officially led and coordinated in Somalia by the representative of the UN Secretary-General, retired US Admiral Jonathan Howe. The four divisions were tasked with:

1. Force Command: Maintaining overall security in Somalia and protecting UN operations. The Force Commander was a Turkish General named Cevik Bir, although his second in command, Major General Thomas M. Montgomery, a US military officer, was noted to wield more power and influence, as the command structure was dominated by US officers. Montgomery headed the US Quick Reaction Force and reported directly to the US Pentagon.
2. Division for Humanitarian Relief and Rehabilitation: Planning and coordination of all humanitarian activities.
3. Division for Political Affairs: Promoting political reconciliation and building of transitional governmental and administrative structures.
4. Justice Division: Formation of civil police and rehabilitation of the judiciary. Also tasked with monitoring violations of international law.

UNOSOM II had a strength of 30,000 personnel, including 22,000 troops and 8,000 logistic and civilian staff from Algeria, Australia, Austria, Belgium, Botswana, Canada, Denmark, Egypt, Fiji, Finland, France, Germany, Greece, India, Indonesia, Ireland, Italy, Kuwait, Jordan, Malaysia, Morocco, Nepal, New Zealand, Nigeria, Norway, Pakistan, Philippines, Spain, South Korea, Romania, Saudi Arabia, Sweden, Switzerland, Tunisia, Turkey, the United Arab Emirates, the United Kingdom, the United States and Zimbabwe. The United States military provided 1,167 troops and numerous helicopter gunships for a Quick Reaction Force, which would remain completely under US operational control.

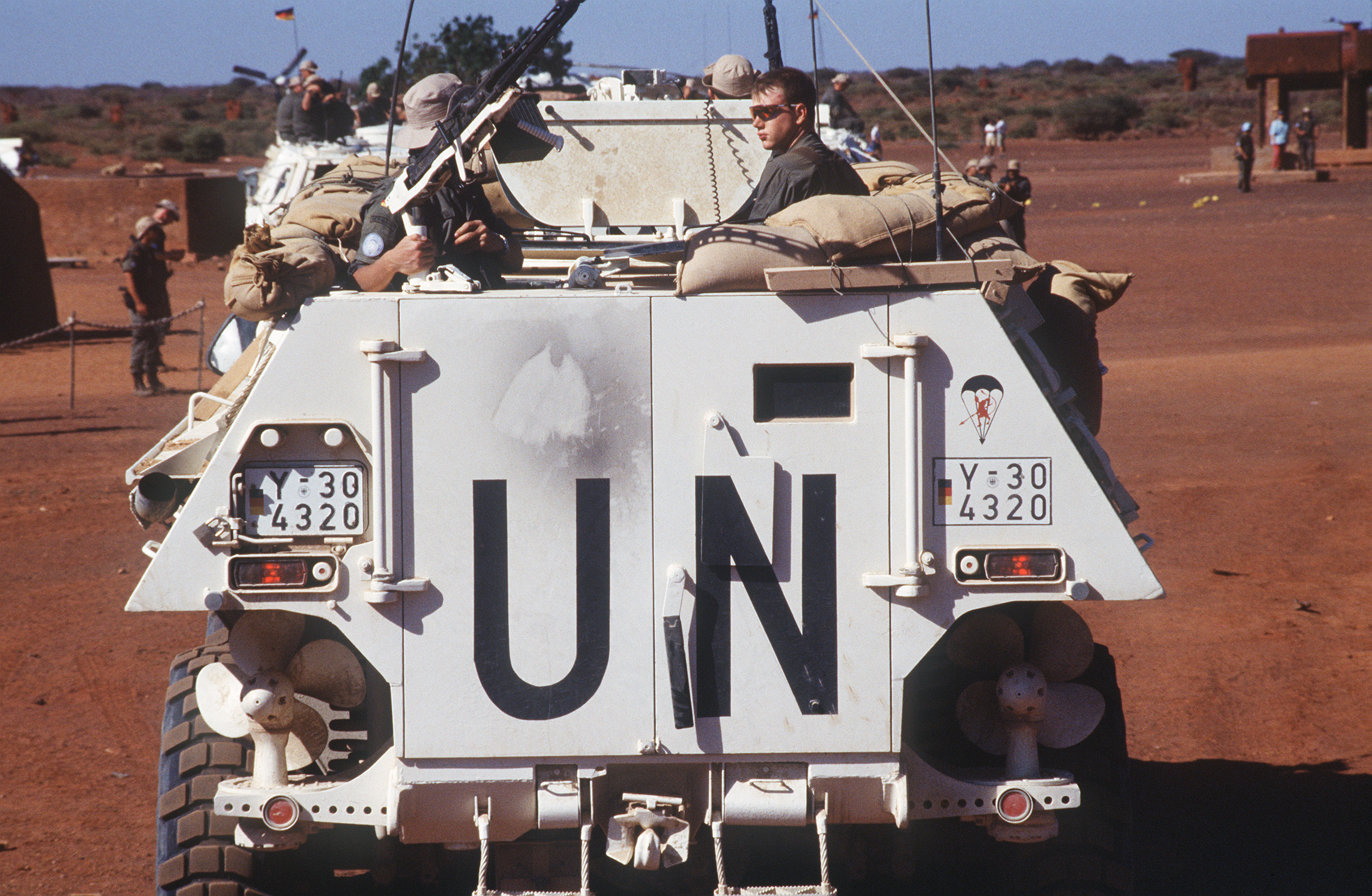
German UNOSOM II troops in Somalia (1993)

Despite UNOSOM II being composed of a coalition of twenty-seven countries, most of the decision makers and many of the staff were Americans, giving the United States significant control over much of the operation. It was observed that very few nations involved had any representation in the UN military command structure. Due to this, many states providing troops to the operation insisted on maintaining command structures with their own respective governments, which would result in numerous future inter-UNOSOM II disputes between contingents. UNOSOM II Force Commander Cevik Bir openly admitted that the critical posts in his headquarters were filled by Americans by May 1993. In addition to this the representative of the UN Secretary-General in Somalia, retired US Admiral Jonathan Howe, staffed the UNOSOM II headquarters with twenty-eight US officers in key positions. Months into the operation, following the 5 June 1993 killings of the Pakistanis and the passing of UNSCR 837, the US effectively took complete lead of the mission. In the months following US officers operated with minimal consultations with UN headquarters in New York. Marine Lt. Gen. Robert B. Johnston, head of UNITAF, stated that although in his view UNITAF had been success US efforts and losses were in vain if UNOSOM II was also not successful.

UNOSOM II divided Somalia into five distinct zones. Northwest, Northeast, Central, South and Mogadishu.

== In operation ==
A federalist government based on 18 autonomous regions was agreed upon by the leaders of Somalia's various armed factions. It was the objective of UNOSOM II to support this new system and initiate nation-building in Somalia. This included disarming the various factions, restoring law and order, helping the people to set up a representative government, and restoring infrastructure.

=== Growing hostilities between UNOSOM and the SNA ===
Major disagreements between the UN and the Somali National Alliance began soon after the establishment of UNOSOM II, centering on the perceived true nature of the operations political mandate. In May 1993, relations between the SNA and UNOSOM would rapidly deteriorate following two significant events.

==== Kismayo Incident ====
During the March Addis Ababa conference, the Somali National Front (SNF), a pro-Barre faction opposing Aidid, smuggled weapons into the strategic port city of Kismayo. Although the city was nominally controlled by the SNA and UNITAF forces, Gen. Hersi Morgan of the SNF ousted the Somali National Alliance forces led by Col. Omar Jess.

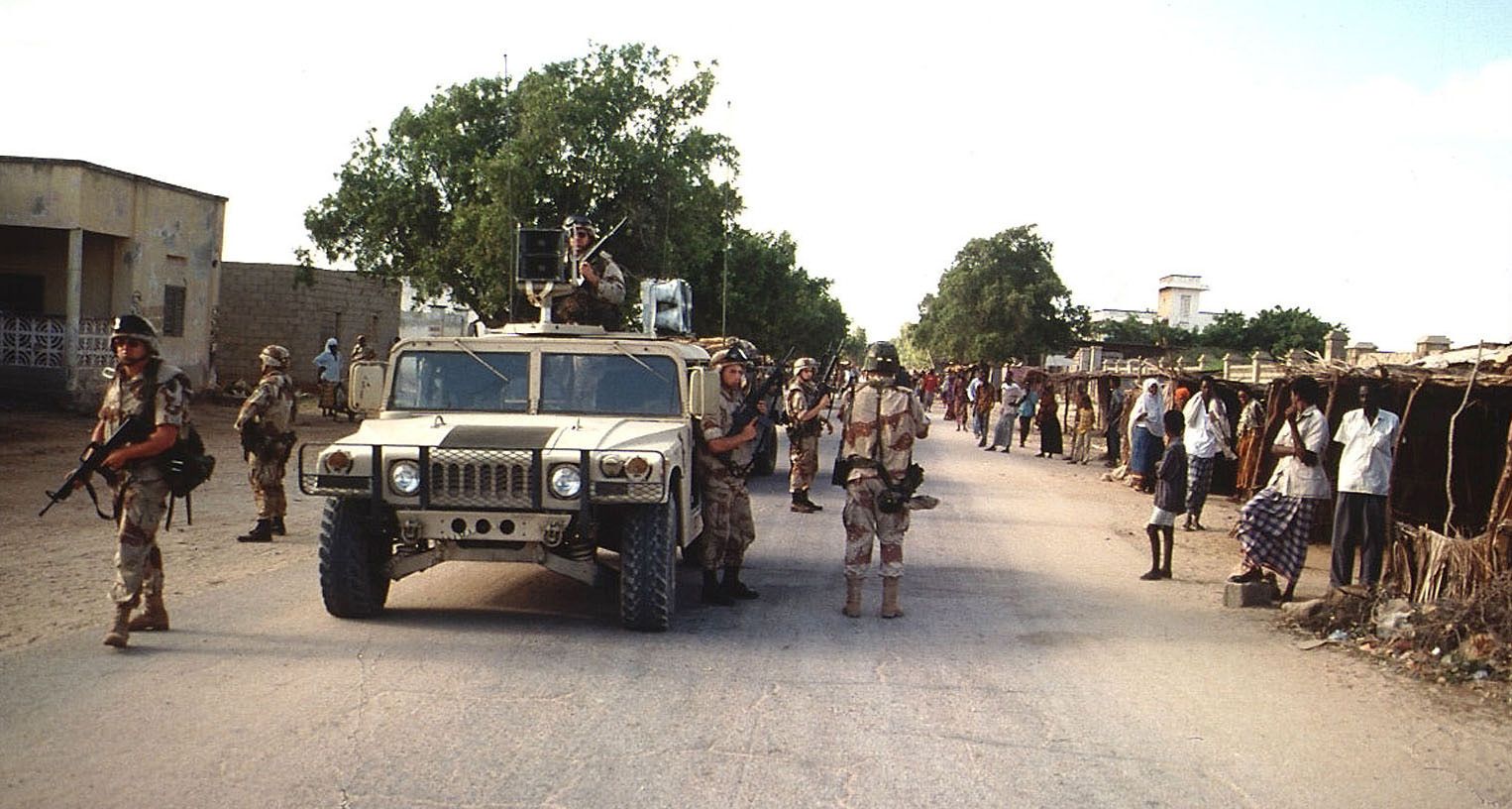
US soldiers coming down a street in Kismayo (1993)

On 7 May 1993, three days after UNOSOM II took control of Kismayo from UNITAF, the SNA made an attempt to retake the city. During the assault the Belgian peacekeepers stationed in the town intervened, considering the assault to take Kismayo an attack on their positions and consequently repelled the SNA forces. The fall of Kismayo to Gen. Morgan infuriated the Somali National Alliance. To the SNA the incident was viewed as blatant U.N. partiality, as UNITAF had failed to prevent Morgan from seizing the city and UNOSOM had then fought SNA forces who had tried to retake it. Following the loss of Kismayo, Aidid began to deeply mistrust the United States and the UN mission.

==== Mudug peace agreement ====
In early May, Gen. Aidid and Col. Abdullahi Yusuf of the Somali Salvation Democratic Front (SSDF) agreed to convene a peace conference for central Somalia. In light of recent conflict between the two, the initiative was seen a major step towards halting the Somali Civil War. Gen. Aidid, having initiated the talks with Col. Yusuf, considered himself the conference chair, setting the agenda. Beginning 9 May, elder delegations from their respective clans, Habr Gidr and Majerteen, met. While Aidid and Yusuf aimed for a central Somalia-focused conference, they clashed with UNOSOM, which aimed to include other regions and replace Aidid's chairmanship with ex-President Abdullah Osman, a staunch critic of Aidid. As the conference began, Aidid sought assistance from UNOSOM ambassador Lansana Kouyate, who proposed air transport for delegates and a 14-day accommodation. However, he was called back to New York and replaced by April Glaspie, following which UNOSOM retracted its offer. Aidid resorted to private aircraft to transport delegates. Following the aircraft incident, Aidid publicly rebuked the United Nations on Radio Mogadishu for interference in Somali internal affairs.

Aidid invited the Special Representative of the Secretary-General for Somalia, Adm. Johnathan Howe, to open the conference, which was refused. The differences between Aidid and the UN proved to be too great, and the conference proceeded without the United Nations participation. On the 2 June 1993 the conference between Gen. Aidid and Col. Abdullahi Yusuf successfully concluded. Admiral Howe was invited to witness the peace agreement, but again declined. The Galkayo peace accord successfully ended large-scale conflict in the Galgadud and Mudug regions of Somalia.

The contention between the Somali National Alliance and UNOSOM from this point forward began to manifest in anti-UNOSOM propaganda broadcast from SNA controlled Radio Mogadishu.

=== Somaliland ===
UNOSOM II had a highly contentious relationship with Somaliland, eventually resulting in the United Nations being expelled from the region. Most notably during a visit to Hargeisa, Leonard Kamungo, the head of the Political Affairs division for UNOSOM II, engaged in discussions with the President of Somaliland, Muhammad Haji Ibrahim Egal. Kamungo warned Egal that he held the authority to deploy UNOSOM military forces in Somaliland without requiring local consent, if he deemed it necessary. This remark incensed Egal who retorted by threatening that Hargeisa "would become the United Nations' Dien Bien Phu." In response, Egal gave Kamungo a 24-hour ultimatum to depart from Somaliland. UNOSOM would later be entirely expelled from the territory on Egals orders.

== UNOSOM II - SNA conflict ==
=== Radio Mogadishu and 5 June 1993 inspection ===
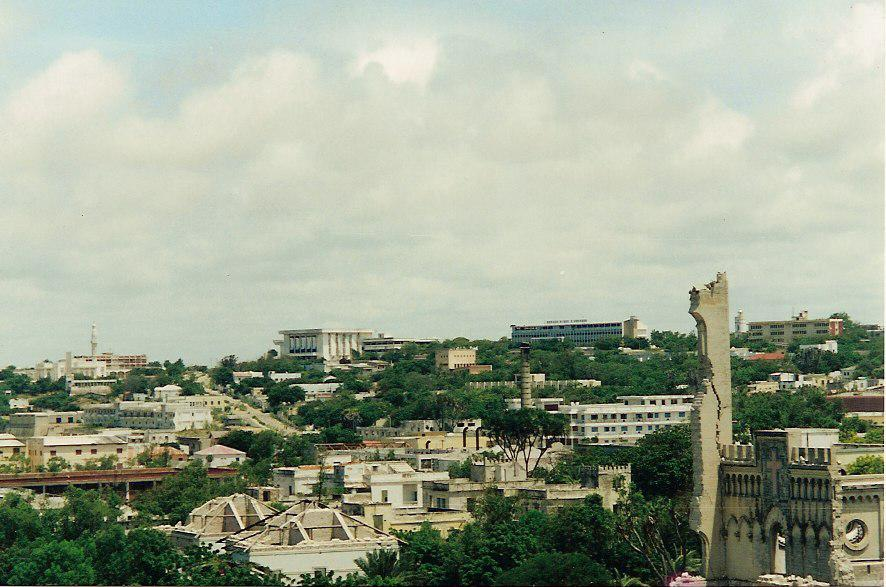
Mogadishu skyline from UNOSOM convoy (1993)

Radio Mogadishu was a highly popular broadcast station with the residents of the city, and was a vital piece of SNA infrastructure that had been captured following a vicious battle with Ali Mahdi's forces. Following the Kismayo and Galkayo incidents that station began to air anti-UNOSOM propaganda, incensing high ranking UN personnel. It was feared that the broadcasts would shift the attitudes of the Somali public towards the United Nations operation, leading UNOSOM officials to resolve to close the station. In mid-May, the Pakistani contingent was asked to draw up a plan to shut down the station. The Pakistanis did not possess the technical expertise required for such an operation and requested that the US supply experts.

Importantly, Radio Mogadishu had also been an Authorized Weapons Store Site (AWSS), subject to UNOSOM inspection. It was decided the American special forces technicians would accompany a Pakistani weapons inspection team to the site in order to determine how to disable the station. Gen. Aidid and the upper echelons of the Somali National Alliance, had been made aware of the discussions to seize or destroy the station.

According to the 1994 United Nations Inquiry:

Opinions differ, even among UNOSOM officials, on whether the weapons inspections of 5 June 1993 was genuine or was merely a cover-up for reconnaissance and subsequent seizure of Radio Mogadishu.

On the morning of Saturday June 5, 1993 an element of the Pakistani force in Somalia had been tasked with the inspection of site AWSS 5, which happened to be located at Aidid controlled Radio Mogadishu. The station was popular across the city, even among those who did not like Aidid or the Habr Gidr clan and concern that UNOSOM was coming to shut it down infuriated many citizens of Mogadishu. The fighting resulted in 24 Pakistanis and dozens of Somalis killed. UNOSOM believed forces associated with Aidid were behind the attack. The 1994 UN Inquiry concluded that in absence of a "...more convincing explanation," it believed the Somali National Alliance was most likely behind the attack. Despite this, the commission noted that no evidence existed to back previous UNOSOM assertions that the attack had been pre-planned or pre-meditated by the SNA, and further noted that the incident had likely been a spontaneous reaction.

=== UNSCR 837 and UNOSOM - SNA war ===
The next day, the UN responded with Resolution 837, reaffirming that the secretary-general had the authorization to "take all necessary measures against those responsible for the armed attacks and to establish the effective authority of UNOSOM II throughout Somalia." This was essentially a declaration of war on Aidid and the Somali National Alliance, leading to numerous armed confrontations between the two parties. Although UNOSOM II had fewer war-fighting resources than UNITAF, it adopted a more ambitious and aggressive stance. Nevertheless, several UNOSOM contingents expressed opposition to the aggressive military posture. They viewed an offensive as politically misguided and militarily untenable. As the conflict dragged on, these contingents began advocating for a diplomatic resolution. International observers notably criticized the UN's decision to initiate a military offensive as 'incomprehensible', given the dynamics of Somali society. Professor Ioan M. Lewis asserted that the UN made an unwise choice to resort to military force, which led to substantial Somali casualties, rather than attempting to politically isolate Aidid and launch an independent legal inquiry. The UN offensive that followed UNSCR 837 had significant negative repercussions for UNOSOM II as it incited hostility from across a wide spectrum of Somali society, extending to those Somali who had been most favorable of the intervention.

==== June 1993 UNOSOM offensive ====
On 12 June 1993 US troops began a military offensive around Mogadishu. On 17 June, a warrant with a $25,000 reward was issued by Admiral Jonathan Howe for information leading to the arrest of Aidid, but he was never captured. That same day, Aidid's compound and Radio Mogadishu were directly targeted by US AC-130 gunships. Over the following weeks, strikes were carried out all over Mogadishu with AC-130s and attack helicopters. UNOSOM began to greatly increase its firepower in Mogadishu and started making deliberate shows of force with Italian and American helicopters over the city. The US Quick Reaction Force, which had been split up into several different hot spots in Somalia, was entirely recalled to Mogadishu. BBC East Africa correspondent Mark Doyle described the war between the Somali National Alliance and UNOSOM forces as seen by journalists in Mogadishu:

Typical daylight hours in south Mogadishu thunder to the sound of American helicopter gunships criss-crossing the skies at low level; militia with small arms or rocket-propelled grenade launchers (RPGs) take aim at what they see as an offensive provocation. It's not unusual, from the main hotel in south Mogadishu, to view open battles, with U.S. helicopters firing 20-millimeter cannons at apparent militia ground positions. From other vantage points, full-scale battles have been observed pitting Turkish tanks, Pakistani APCs, and American Humvees against the militia. All this has taken place in a heavily built-up urban environment, with the inevitable heavy casualties. By night, the macabre events continue. Loud explosions are common as militia mortars are aimed at the UN compound or the fortified, UN-controlled airport. UN forces' flares light up the sky in an often futile attempt to pinpoint their enemy. Slow dull tracer fire streaks across the blackness from the militias' weapons. The crack-crack-crack and flash-flash-flash of cannons fired from U.S. helicopter gunships can be seen spitting at apparent militia emplacements.

In the week after the offensive, US officers and intelligence experts contended that Aidid's command and control capability over his SNA fighters had been significantly weakened, and the organization's morale had taken a substantial hit. They also believed that the intensive American aerial bombardment had decimated most of the Somali National Alliance's arsenal. American officials involved in the war estimated that the SNA had no more than 300 loyal fighters, motivated merely by cash or Khat handouts. However, interviews conducted by the Washington Post with Somali insurgents painted a contrasting picture: a highly motivated and committed military force whose morale seemed to strengthen as the conflict intensified. Months into the conflict, US and UN officials would concede that they had, "...greatly underestimated their enemy,"

Following the passing of UNSCR 837, the hunt for Aidid characterized much of the UNOSOM II intervention. The increasing tempo of military operations being carried out in Mogadishu caused civilian casualties and began to seriously affect the relationship between UN troops and the Somali people. UNOSOM forces began to be increasingly perceived as foreign interlopers and imperialists, particularly after incidents such as the 13 June mass shooting, when UN troops fired upon a demonstration with a machine gun killing 20 Somalis, many women and children, and a US helicopter attack on Digfer Hospital on 17 June. The Times reported that in the month following the offensive at least 200 civilians had been directly killed by foreign troops. Many Mogadishu residents were deeply disturbed by the effects of heavy weaponry utilized by UN forces in Mogadishu, such as AC-130s, helicopter gunships, wire-guided TOW missiles and rockets. Airstrikes in particular heavily affected Somali civilians and sparked hostility. Each major armed confrontation with UN forces was noted to have the deleterious effect of increasing Aidid's stature with the Somali public. In the view of Professor Mats Berdal of the Department of War Studies at King's College, the conduct of US armed forces during the conflict demonstrated that the US military was not attuned to the requirements of low-level military operations that Somalia required at the time. He argued that, "[There is] a distinctive mindset and approach to low-intensity operations which had been shaped by the American experience during and after Vietnam, and by a deeply entrenched belief in the efficacy of technology and firepower as a means of minimizing one’s own casualties. It is an approach that was inappropriate to the particular circumstances of Somalia."

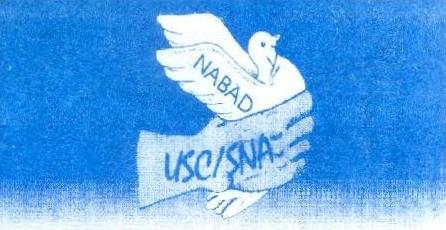
A UNOSOM II propaganda leaflet depicting a white dove of peace being crushed by a fist labelled "USC/SNA" ("United Somali Congress / Somali National Alliance")

The UNOSOM offensive had significant negative political consequences for the intervention as it alienated the Somali people, strengthened political support for Aidid, and led to growing criticism of the operation internationally. As a result numerous UNOSOM II contingents began to increasingly push for a more conciliatory and diplomatic approach with the SNA. Relief agencies and humanitarian organizations publicly distanced themselves from the UN offensive. The backlash from Somali political and military factions against the offensive was so profound that even groups previously ambivalent or antagonistic towards Aidid began to perceive the UN and US forces as foreign oppressors. The escalating UNOSOM offensive resulted in the operation forfeiting potential support from other Somali factions. Former Under-Secretary-General of the United Nations, Ramesh Thakur, stated that, "The scale, intensity, and frequency of the use of force by UNOSOM after June 1993 bore little resemblance to the rhetoric and expectations of when it was established, nor any recognizable relationship by then to a peacekeeping operation as defined in the UN lexicon."

British academic Alex de Waal observed that UNOSOM's war against the insurgency set an important legal precedent, as UN forces effectively declared immunity from the laws of war. Following a US helicopter attack on Digfer Hospital, de Waal confronted UN commanders in Mogadishu asking if the operation considered itself bound by the Geneva Conventions. A UN official had responded in regard to the attack that, "The normal rules of engagement do not apply in this nation." During this time, UNOSOM forces tried to disarm residents in parts of Mogadishu. Dutch journalist Linda Polman reported that US troops shelled the homes of Somalis who resisted surrendering their weapons, resulting in significant civilian casualties.

==== Bloody Monday raid ====
On 12 July 1993, a house where a meeting of clan elders was taking place was attacked by US AH-1 Cobra helicopters in what became known to the Somalis as Bloody Monday. UNOSOM claimed that they had launched a successful raid on a Somali National Alliance command and control center where hardliners had been gathered, an account that is widely disputed by Somalis, foreign journalists and human rights organizations. Johnathan Howe alleged that evidence to back UN claims could not be provided because the cameras recording the raid had jammed. The Red Cross claimed that 54 Somalis had been killed, including several notable religious elders. According to Dr. Sebastian Kaempf, the Abdi House raid represented the single most important event during UNOSOM II, as the consequences of the attack proved disastrous for UNOSOM interests in Somalia. Black Hawk Down author Mark Bowden noted 12 July had been a serious mistake and had the effect of firmly uniting a large portion of Mogadishu behind Aidid. Notable groups and organizations such as the Vatican, the Organisation of African Unity, World Vision, Doctors Without Borders, Human Rights Watch and Amnesty International called for UNOSOM to review it policies and course.

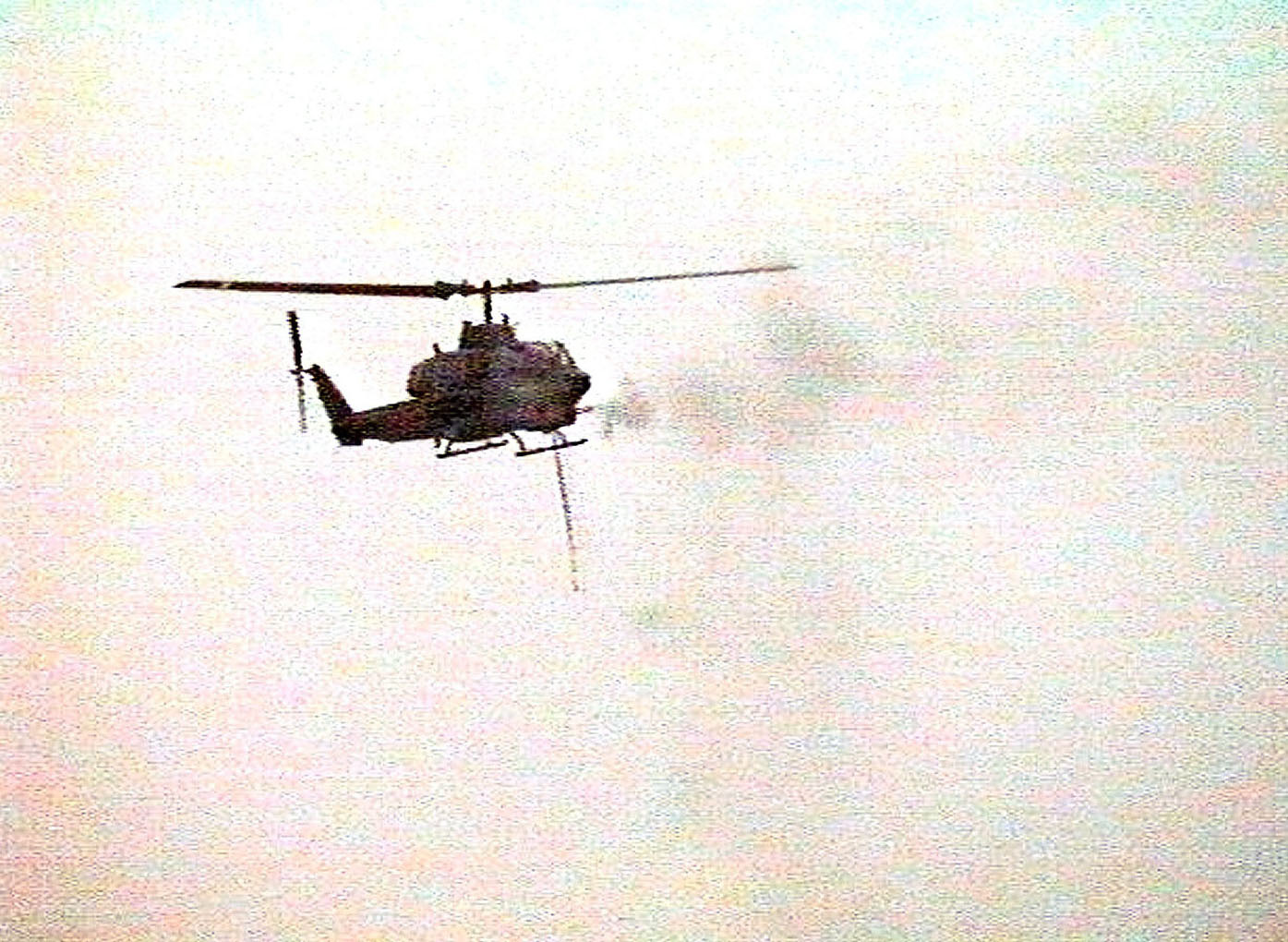
American AH-1 Cobra firing its 20 mm cannon over Mogadishu

The raid exposed deep rifts and created dissension amongst the UNOSOM II coalition, which consequently began fraying the cohesion and unity of the operation. The head of the UNOSOM II Justice Division criticized the raid in a memo to head of UNOSOM, US Admiral Johnathan Howe. Further criticism of the raid came from numerous contributing states such as Ireland, Kuwait, Saudi Arabia, United Arab Emirates, Zimbabwe, but most notably the Italian contingent, who threatened to pull out of the whole operation a few days later citing concerns that the escalation was indicative that relief role of UNOSOM II had been overtaken by an American-led campaign against Mohammed Farah Aidid. The Italians, who had ruled Somalia as a colonial territory for half a century, believed that the unprecedented attack threatened to widen the civil war and turn the Somalis against the entire UN peacekeeping force. A Pakistani officer in Mogadishu noted that the clash between the Americans and Italians was destroying the cohesion of UNOSOM II, and that a review of strategy was desperately needed. American envoy to Somalia, Robert B. Oakley, stated that after the raid countries such as Italy, France, and Zimbabwe, as well as other UNOSOM contingents, ceased their participation in operations against Aidid upon receiving orders from their respective governments. This decision weakened the United Nations' already fragile command authority. Additionally, many humanitarian efforts came to a halt, and numerous non-governmental organizations expressed their disapproval of both the United Nations and the United States. Intense diplomatic efforts were consequently made in order to avert a major split in UNOSOM II.

The strike also caused an outcry among UN civilian staffers and disenchantment over the direction of UNOSOM II for employees of the humanitarian section. At least nine UN civilian employees in Mogadishu working for the humanitarian sector either resigned or walked away from their posts in protest, including the top UNOSOM Justice Division official in Somalia, Ann Wright. Many of those who stayed commented to reporters that the United Nations had relinquished its moral authority in its war against Aidid.

The dissension in the U.N. ranks with the Italians and others over what had occurred on July 12, 1993, led to a significant lull in UNOSOM operations in Mogadishu until the August 8, 1993 killings of American soldiers. The raid would lead to a significant increase in attacks on UNOSOM II troops and American forces in Mogadishu being deliberately targeted by Somali factions for the first times. That month night patrols in Mogadishu were halted entirely due to the city becoming too dangerous for foreign troops.

=== Escalation of insurgency and deployment of Task Force Ranger ===
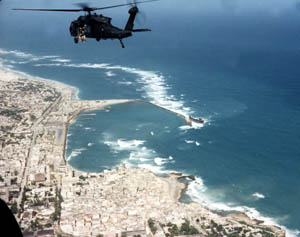
US Black Hawk patrols over Mogadishu following the deployment of Task Force Ranger

Somali militias and volunteers increasingly began targeting UNOSOM II and US forces, causing further casualties. Following the 12 July 1993 raid, firefights between the SNA and UNOSOM began occurring almost daily. By September 1993, the Pan-Arab newspaper Al-Hayat reported that several Somali Islamic factions, which had previously remained neutral in the war, had now tacitly allied with the SNA. When the conflict had begun in June 1993 Islamic factions had divided over whether not to fight foreign troops because Aidid had previously been a major threat to them. As civilian casualties began mounting in July and August numerous Islamic factions began to launch attacks on UNOSOM forces in Mogadishu after sunset. Independent sources in Mogadishu, corroborated by Al-Hayat, indicated that the majority of night military operations throughout 1993 were coordinated by a variety of Somali Islamic groups within the city. Notably, Al-Itihaad al-Islamiya, a prominent Somali Islamist militant organization that had previously been in conflict with Aidid's forces in 1992, also began engaging in the insurgency against the American and UN forces. While Aidid did not overtly claim responsibility for these night operations, Al-Hayat noted that he sought to project the appearance of being the orchestrator for propaganda purposes.

As American casualties started to mount in Somalia, domestic backlash in the United States grew. Bipartisan support from the US senate began to build for a withdrawal. By August 1993, it was evident to the Clinton administration that a strategy shift was necessary to retain domestic support for US involvement in Somalia. This shift was signaled by Defense Secretary Les Aspin in his 27 August speech, advocating for a decreased military focus in UNOSOM II and urging the UN and the OAU to resume negotiations with all parties. Both the US Secretary of State and the National Security Advisor pushed for a shift towards diplomacy. Certain US officials advocated for a more aggressive response, among them was Ambassador Robert R. Gosende from the State Department. Gosende had written a cable recommending the deployment of thousands of additional troops and urged the abandonment of all diplomatic engagements with the SNA. Contrarily, General Joseph P. Hoar, who was at the helm of CENTCOM, expressed sharp disagreement with Gosende's approach. In a confidential memo, General Hoar articulated his belief that if more American troops were needed, then control of Mogadishu was already lost.

On 8 August, insurgents detonated a remote-controlled bomb against a U.S. military vehicle and killed American soldiers for the first time. Two weeks later, another bomb injured seven. In response, President Bill Clinton approved the proposal to deploy a special task force composed of 400 US Army Rangers and Delta-force Commandos. Despite growing reservations about the effectiveness of UNOSOM military operations against the Somali National Alliance, the immediate concern of protecting US forces led to the decision to deploy elite forces. In August elite unit, named Task Force Ranger, consisting of 441 elite US troops was flown into Mogadishu and began a manhunt for Aidid in what became known as Operation Gothic Serpent.

On 15 September 1993, US Major Gen. David C. Meade conveyed in a confidential memo to his superiors that the campaign against the insurgency was faltering, both tactically and potentially operationally. He cautioned that persisting in the conflict risked catastrophe. On October 3, 1993, Task Force Ranger raided a hotel in Mogadishu to capture high ranking SNA personnel. What ensued was the longest, bloodiest and deadliest battle for US and UNOSOM II troops in Somalia. In what later became known as the Battle of Mogadishu, eighteen US soldiers were killed. Images of their dead bodies being dragged through the streets were broadcast on internationally, infuriating the American public.

== Fallout of the Battle of Mogadishu and the end of UNOSOM II ==
On 6 October 1993, U.S. President Bill Clinton personally ordered General Joseph P. Hoar to cease all combat operations against Somali National Alliance, except in self defence. General Hoar proceeded to relay the stand down order to Generals William F. Garrison of Task Force Ranger and Thomas M. Montgomery of the American Quick Reaction Force. The following day on 7 October, Clinton publicly announced a major change in course in the mission. Substantial U.S. forces would be sent to Somalia as short term reinforcements, but all American forces would be withdrawn from the country by the end of March 1994. He defended American policy in Somalia but admitted that it had been a mistake for American forces to be drawn into the decision "to personalize the conflict" to Aidid. He went on to reappoint the former U.S. Special Envoy for Somalia Robert B. Oakley to signal the administrations return to focusing on political reconciliation.

The Somali National Alliance perceived the cessation of the military operation as a decisive victory. The stand down order given to U.S. forces in Somalia led other UNOSOM II contingents to effectively avoid any confrontation with the SNA. This led to the majority of patrols in Mogadishu to cease and numerous checkpoints in SNA controlled territory to be abandoned. For the remainder of the operation UNOSOM troops withdrew into entrenched positions and practically disappeared from Mogadishu streets. The Somali National Alliance and other factions retook full position of territory in the city that they had previously conceded.

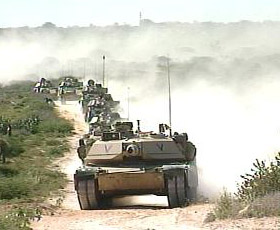
An armoured column of M1A1 Abrams Tanks and M2 Bradley IFVs move down a dirt road outside the city of Mogadishu, Somalia. (January 1994).

The next month on 16 November 1993, the United Nations Security Council instructed Secretary-General Boutros-Ghali to suspend arrest actions and declared the release of all Somali National Alliance prisoners of war. The following day Mohamed Farah Aidid announced that the decision had proved that the SNA had achieved a victory over the UN. After the cessation of hostilities between the SNA and UNOSOM, Acting Special Representative Lansana Kouyate (replacing Adm. Johnathan Howe) successfully launched an initiative to normalize relations in March 1994. Numerous points of contention between the respective organizations were discussed at length and understandings were reached, facilitating the normalization of the relationship between the UN and the SNA. That same year the UNOSOM II began withdrawing. The withdrawal of UNOSOM forces weakened Aidids prominence within the SNA, as the war had served to unify the alliance around a common foreign enemy.

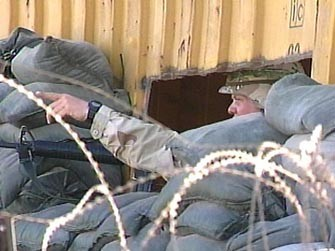
A U.S. soldier at the main entrance to the Port of Mogadishu points to identify a sniper's possible firing position (January 1994).

=== Withdrawal and end of UNOSOM II ===
All US forces in Somalia completely withdrew on March 3, 1994. All European contingents also decided to withdraw at this time, leaving behind almost exclusively Third World forces to man UNOSOM II. Though it was widely feared the less equipped contingents came under attack from Somali militia following the Western withdrawal, the period was mostly uneventful. Local hostility forced the remaining UNOSOM staff in Somalia to travel by helicopter, even for distances as short as a kilometre. This was in stark contrast to the intervention's onset when the UN personnel could travel via bus shuttle system.

On November 4, 1994, after peacemaking efforts by the remaining 1,900 UNOSOM II troops failed, the United Nations Security Council (UNSC) voted unanimously to withdraw all forces in Resolution 954. Subsequently, on November 16, the UNSC authorized Resolution 955, placing new emphasis on peacemaking and reconstruction and returning to a less reactive role. The withdrawal of the remaining UN military and police troops from Somalia was completed on March 28, 1995, thereby ending UNOSOM II's mandate.

=== Casualties ===
UNOSOM II forces suffered a total of 385 casualties, including over 130 deaths. US forces suffered a total of 196 casualties during the operation, including 26 deaths. 7 Nigerian soldiers were killed during a skirmish with the SNA in September 1993. Estimates of total UNOSOM II personnel killed vary from 134 to 154 across the entire operation. 110 of the deaths are attributed to combat related fatalities. The vast majority, approximately 80, were killed in the course of the operations of 1993.

Although the operation's casualties have been surpassed by the more recent MINUSMA operation in Mali, UNOSOM II was among the deadliest missions in UN history for peacekeepers. It stands out for having the highest number of deaths resulting from hostile actions compared to both earlier and subsequent operations.

Various estimates have been provided for the number of Somalis killed or wounded during the operation. Both Mohamed Sahnoun, former Special Representative of the Secretary General to Somalia, and American envoy to Somalia, Robert B. Oakley said that 6,000 to 10,000 Somalis had been killed or wounded in the war with UNOSOM forces. Many Somalis were killed as a result of helicopter gunship fire. According to American foreign correspondent Scott Peterson, Aidid personally told him a total of 13,000 Somalis had been killed by UNOSOM forces. According to Peterson, it was said that nearly two-thirds of the Somali casualties were women and children. In Peterson's view, it was unlikely that Somali dead or wounded during UNOSOM II surpassed 2,000. Charles W. Maynes, an American diplomat and editor of Foreign Policy, reported that according to private estimates by CIA officials, U.S. troops alone may have been responsible for between 7,000 and 10,000 Somali casualties.

According to SNA personnel, an estimated 900 fighters died in the war with UNOSOM, the most significant losses inflicted during the Battle of Mogadishu.

=== Results of 1994 UN Inquiry ===
The month following the Battle of Mogadishu, the United States urged the United Nations to establish the commission to determine who was responsible for the clashes between UNOSOM II peacekeepers and Aidid's SNA forces. A three-man UN inquiry commission headed by Matthew Nglube, former chief justice of Zambia, Gen. Emmanuel Erskine of Ghana and Gen. Gustav Hagglund of Finland was set up by the Security Council. On 30 November 1993 the commission landed in Mogadishu.

The report charged the Gen. Aidid with launching the 5 June 1993, attack which initiated the conflict between the SNA and UNOSOM. Notably, it also heavily criticized U.N. peacekeeping officials for embarking on a campaign of forceful disarmament of Somali factions, an effort that antagonized the Aidid's forces and sharpened tensions. The commission questioned the merit of the aggressive UNOSOM peacekeeping strategy and argued that the U.N. should not have abandoned its neutral role in Somalia. The inquiry criticized the United States for operating under a separate military command and leading raids against Aidid that were not coordinated with UNOSOM officers. The commission condemned the use of American combat helicopters over the heavily populated neighborhoods of Mogadishu and criticized tactics as "incompatible with basic tenets of peacekeeping". The report recommended financial reparations for Somali civilians who became victims of the fighting.

== Criticism of UNOSOM II ==
=== Over emphasis on military operations ===
UNOSOM II was widely criticized for placing too much emphasis on military operations. Over 90% of the operations $1.6 billion budget was used for military or security purposes. In July 1993, UN relief head Jan Eliasson publicly admonished UNOSOM II for spending 10 times as much on military operations in Somalia than it did on aid. At the time he cautioned that the original objective of sending troops to Somalia was being forgotten. Due to the war with the Somali National Alliance and the insurgency, UNOSOM II would end up spending far more than the allocated $1.6 billion.

Ramesh Thakur, a former Under-Secretary-General of the United Nations, pointed out that the extent, intensity, and frequency of military force used by UNOSOM II after 5 June 1993, did not align with the principles and definition of a peacekeeping operation as defined by the United Nations. The day after the Battle of Mogadishu, after being asked by journalists on national news if Malaysia disagreed with any UNOSOM policies, Defence Minister Najib Razak commented: "We find there is too much emphasis on military action, like it was an obsession." This led to accusations from some Somalia observers that UNOSOM was helping build up the myth of Aidid by depicting him as the only Somali capable of defying a foreign military presence.

=== Excessive force and human rights abuses ===
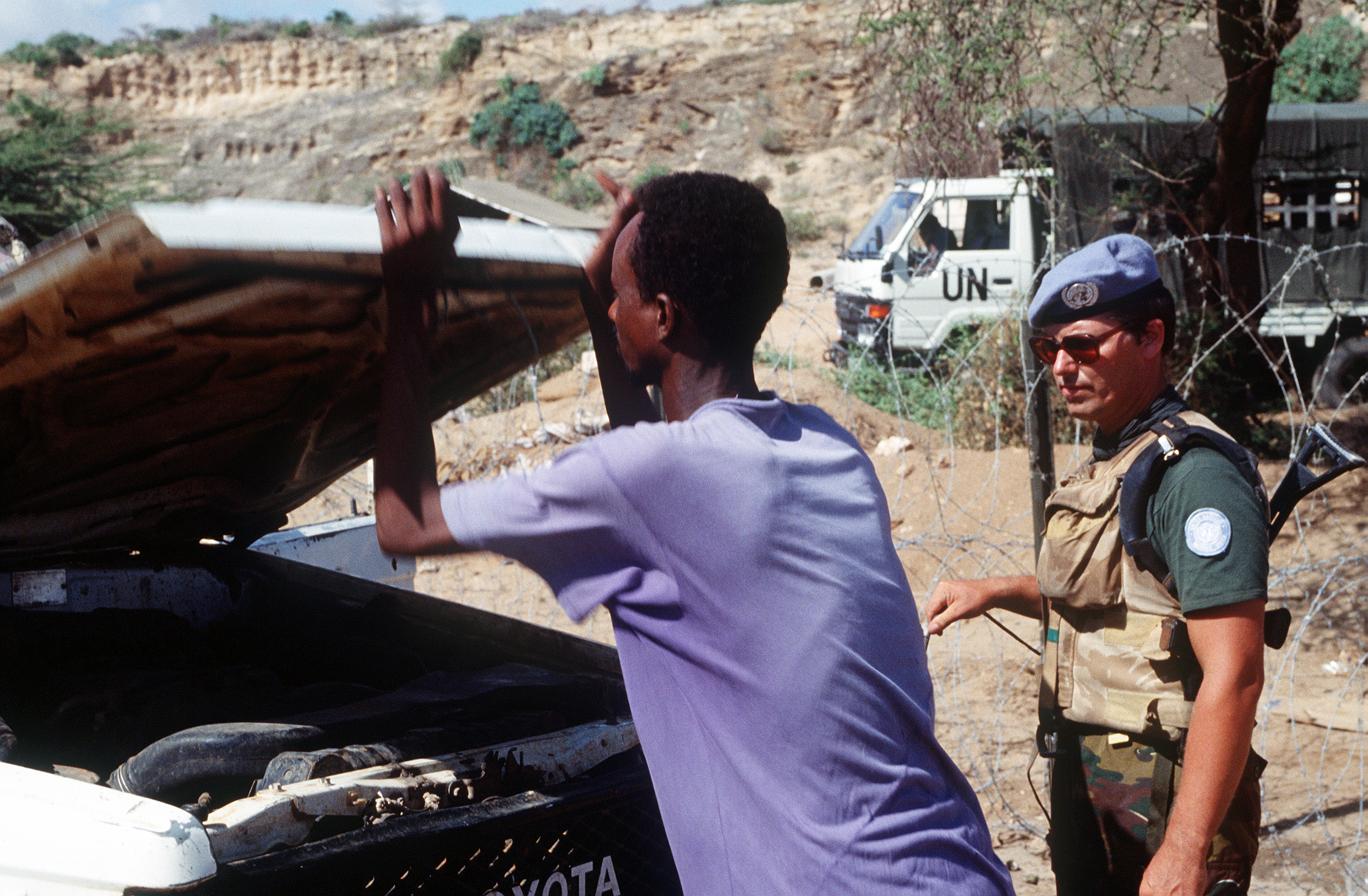
Belgian UNOSOM II soldier conducts inspection in Kismayo

UNOSOM II forces were criticized for various instances of human rights abuses, violations of international law and excessive force by a wide range of academics, foreign correspondents and humanitarian organizations. Doctors Without Borders, Human Rights Watch and Amnesty International all criticized UNOSOM II on these grounds. Africa Rights Watch and Doctors Without Borders both published detailed reports of abuses by UN forces during the summer of 1993. While conceding UN troops were in a difficult position, the Africa Rights Watch report concluded that abuses and atrocities carried out by UNOSOM II force stemmed from the highest echelons of the command structure and were not cases of undisciplined actions by individual soldiers. According to de Waal, on several occasions UNOSOM forces in Mogadishu violated the Geneva Conventions. Among the forces responsible for human rights abuses were the United States, Belgium, Italy, France, Nigeria and numerous other UNOSOM contingents.

Some of the most widely criticized events that occurred from 5 June to 3–4 October 1993 include:

- US forces fired missiles at Digfer Hospital in Mogadishu due to Aidid's militia using the buildings as a vantage point to fire from, resulting in the deaths of nine patients. Africa Rights Watch asserted that the incident represented a prima-facie case that UN command in Mogadishu had violated the Geneva Convention.
- Pakistani forces fired on two large public demonstrations killing over 20 Somalis, many of whom were women and children.
- US Quick Reaction Force launched the Abdi House raid during a meeting of Somali elders, resulting in the deaths of at least 60 civilians according to Amnesty International.
- Rony Brauman, who was then serving as the president of Doctors Without Borders, detailed an incident in which the premises of Action Against Hunger in Mogadishu, also housing the Doctors Without Borders team, came under attack by UNOSOM forces. Two U.S. AH-1 Cobra helicopters, disregarding the clearly visible Red Cross flags and emblems of both humanitarian organizations on the building, fired two missiles at the compound before strafing it with machine-gun fire, resulting in the death of one aid worker and injuries to several others. According to Brauman the incident was triggered by the presence of a vehicle nearby which the attack helicopters had deemed suspicious, but belonged to journalists from the France 2 television channel.
- In mid-September US AH-1 Cobra helicopters killed nearly 100 Somalis who were in the vicinity of a clash between the SNA and the 10th Mountain Division using TOW missiles and cannon fire. Children living in the surrounding neighborhood had also been killed by stray helicopter fire.

The UN's response to these events were characterized by a marked lack of transparency and accountability. Despite possessing internal advice from its own legal and political staff in Somalia, UNOSOM reportedly disregard their input and criticism. Amnesty International described the UN's internal investigatory mechanisms for dealing with human rights violations by its troops in Somalia as highly inadequate and inconsistent with the UN's own standards. In the vast majority of incidents, no UN forces were ever reprimanded or punished.

=== Misleading claims and relationship with journalists ===
Former Under-Secretary-General Ramesh Thakur observed that UNOSOM II consistently undermined its authority by deceiving and misleading journalists. He noted that The Times correspondents in Mogadishu could recall numerous occasions where UNOSOM officials had lied to reporters. According to BBC journalist Mark Doyle, reporters in Mogadishu often treated the versions of events purported by UNOSOM with as much skepticism as those purported by Aidid. Doyle claimed that information given out by UN officials was sometimes deliberately misleading. Reuters Mogadishu correspondent Aidan Hartley noted that UNOSOM officials, "...toed a line of propaganda that was palpably absurd to reporters who went around and saw what was happening."

In an incident noted by both Aidan Hartley and Ramesh Thakur, an American AH-1 Cobra helicopter fire a missile into Mogadishu in view of a large crowd of Somalis and foreign correspondents. Witnesses watched and had filmed a TOW missile leave the helicopter and spiral into a tea shop, killing a Somali woman. A press conference was held after, during which the UNOSOM spokesman flatly denied the eyewitness accounts and claimed that no helicopters had launched any attack. Following the denial, a TV cameraman got up and played the tape he had filmed of the helicopter firing the missile. UNOSOM only admitted responsibility after footage of the attack was later broadcast globally. In another significant incident, Pakistani UNOSOM troops opened fire with a machine gun onto a crowd of protesters. Thousands of Somalis citizens and dozens foreign journalists had witnessed the troops open fire, unprovoked, from a rooftop emplacement resulting in the deaths of dozens of civilians, including women and children. UNOSOM claimed that Somali National Alliance militia had used the crowd as human shields to fire on the Pakistanis, who then shot back in self defence. According to The Washington Post, the UNOSOM account of the shooting was disputed by virtually all witnesses.

According to American war correspondent Scott Peterson, US forces had censored images of mortars firing from UN bases directly into the city of Mogadishu by confiscating the pictures and arresting the photojournalist who had taken the image. In another incident, Associated Press photographer Peter Northall was photographing an American UH-60 Black Hawk purposely "rotor washing" a market in the city, only to then be directly targeted and assaulted with six percussion grenades from the helicopter. UNOSOM II press spokesman, US Maj. David Stockwell defended the incident, stating that Northall posed "a threat to himself".

== Aftermath and legacy ==
UNOSOM II is widely regarded as unsuccessful in achieving its main objectives and having ended in failure, largely due to the decision to withdraw without completing its goals following the Battle of Mogadishu in October 1993. According to Alex de Waal, the failure of the operation can only be understood, "...in the context of the routine brutality and impunity of many of the military contingents, which antagonized Somalis who would have otherwise been supportive." A 1995 Amnesty International report concluded that the operation had demonstrated a poor record of promoting and protecting human rights, which consequently severely impede its ability to function.

UNOSOM II’s complete departure in early 1995 did not result in the eruption of violence that was widely predicted, though the civil war continued to simmer with occasional clashes between factions. The withdrawal led to the formation of local administrations gaining momentum throughout Somalia, such as localized Islamic Courts and regional administrations like Puntland, resulting in period of relative stability and economic growth until the early 2000's. Somali political science professor Hussein Adam notes, "With the collapse of UNOSOM-sponsored institutions, more authentic entities, including authoritative local leaders, have emerged. With the distorting effect of UNOSOM no longer present, the process of both political and economic transformation has been facilitated. In certain places, including northern Mogadishu, alternative institutions have emerged without any external support."

In the view of Walter Clarke, a high ranking US official involved in Operation Restore Hope, and Jeffrey Herbst, Associate Professor at Princeton University, "The intervention in Somalia was not an abject failure; an estimated 100,000 lives were saved. But its mismanagement should be an object lesson for peacekeepers...on other such missions." The figure of Somalis saved following the large scale military intervention in December 1992 is disputed by various other academics and organizations. According to an assessment by the Washington based independent NGO Refugee Policy Group, only 10,000 to 25,000 lives of the approximately 100,000 rescued by international assistance had been saved by the UNITAF and UNOSOM II interventions, though de Waal argues the true figure of lives saved may have been even lower.

At the same time, there were between 2,000 and 13,000 Somali casualties during UNOSOM II. This has led to debates about the net impact of UNOSOM II.

In Somali culture, the era has become the subject of numerous plays and poetry. As noted by Dr. Ana Ljubinkovic, these works often take the form of sophisticated dramas, showcasing a critical perspective of UNOSOM's perceived arrogance and misjudgments.

== Bibliography ==
- Drysdale, John (1994). Whatever happened to Somalia? A Tale of Tragic Blunders. London: HAAN. ISBN 1-874209-51-0. OCLC 30736422.
- Pouligny, Béatrice (2006). Peace operations seen from below : UN missions and local people. Bloomfield, CT: Kumarian Press. ISBN 1-56549-224-2. OCLC 64486263.
- Polman, Linda (2003). We Did Nothing: Why the Truth Doesn't Always Come Out When the UN Goes in. Viking Press. ISBN 9780141012902. OCLC 52233618.
- de Waal, Alex (1997). Famine Crimes: Politics & the Disaster Relief Industry in Africa. Britain: Indiana University Press. ISBN 0-253-21158-1. OCLC 37261123.
- Peterson, Scott (2000). Me Against My Brother: At War in Somalia, Sudan, and Rwanda: A Journalist Reports From the Battlefields of Africa. New York: Routledge. ISBN 9780415921985. OCLC 43287853.
- Kaempf, Sebastian (2018). Saving Soldiers or Civilians? : Casualty Aversion Versus Civilian Protection in Asymmetric Conflicts. Cambridge: Cambridge University Press. ISBN 978-1-108-42764-7. OCLC 1032810239.
- Brune, Lester H. (1999). The United States and Post-Cold War Interventions : Bush and Clinton in Somalia, Haiti, and Bosnia, 1992-1998. Claremont, CA: Regina Books. ISBN 978-0-941690-90-4. OCLC 40521220.
- DiPrizio, Robert C. (2002). Armed Humanitarians : U.S. Interventions from Northern Iraq to Kosovo. Baltimore: Johns Hopkins University Press. ISBN 9780801870675. OCLC 48706559.
- Allard, Kenneth (1995). Somalia Operations : Lessons Learned (PDF). Washington, DC: National Defense University Press. ISBN 978-0160455773. OCLC 32155661. Archived from the original (PDF) on 8 August 2022.
- Mayall, James (1996). The New Interventionism, 1991-1994 : United Nations Experience in Cambodia, Former Yugoslavia, and Somalia. New York: Cambridge University Press. ISBN 9780521551977. OCLC 33047184.
- Prunier, Gérard (1997). Clarke, Walter; Herbst, Jeffery (eds.). Learning from Somalia : The Lessons of Armed Humanitarian Intervention. Westview Press. ISBN 0-8133-2793-8. OCLC 35849136.
