= Madhubala (1950 film) =

1950 film by Prahlad Dutt

- Directed by: Prahlad Dutt
- Story by: R. C. Chaudhary
- Starring: Dev Anand; Madhubala
- Cinematography: D. C. Mehta
- Edited by: S. G. Chavande
- Music by: Lacchiram
- Release date: 16 September 1950
- Country: India
- Language: Hindi

Madhubala is a 1950 Indian Hindi-language romantic drama film directed by Prahlad Dutt, and starring Madhubala in the title role of a heiress wooed by several mercenary man and her search for true love. Dev Anand plays her love interest, and Jeevan, Randhir and Ramesh Thakur also star in pivotal roles. It was the first of many films to star Madhubala and Dev Anand together.

The film was named after the lead actress, Madhubala.

== Plot ==
Madhubala was heir to two inheritances of her father: wealth and heart disease. She was leading a lonely life, her only solace being the Doctor who was more like a father to her. Many young people were meeting her off and on with different motives and there was regular tussle between them to win her favours. Amongst them the most insistent was Kalicharan, the proprietor of a dramatic company. Madhubala was passing her days trying to draw what comfort she could. Seeing her condition, the Doctor advised her to go to a village as the cool and sedate atmosphere over there would have a soothing effect on her. In the village Madhubala met Ashok. After few bad encounters, both began to love each other.

They decided to marry. Preparations for marriage were going ahead. As luck would have it, Madhubala's friends headed by Kalicharan came to the village in search of her. Kalicharan decided his game. He cracked cruel jokes at Ashok's cost. Ashok was stung to the quick. He felt that Madhubala was party to this. He broke up the preparation for the marriage. Because of Ashok's attitude Madhubala came to the city but with a weakened heart. She began to lose interest in life. Ashok began to relent. He came to the city and met Madhubala. But Madhubala's cold attitude upset him. In a frenzy, began to create havoc and nuisance in the street. He was fined for this misdemeanour. He was released as Madhubala paid the fine. Kalicharan played his cards expertly. He whispered into Ashok's ears that Madhubala paid up the fine just to spite him. He engaged him in his dramatic company in order to put an end to Ashok's life. A burning curtain fell on Ashok's head and he lost his eyesight. Madhubala went to the hospital to see him but Ashok scolded her. Ashok went to his native place. Madhubala went to the village. She got herself engaged at his place under an assumed name Sheela. Under her careful nursing Ashok's eyes were cured. When Ashok came to know that Sheela and Madhubala were the same, he got excited. But Randhir explained the position and on the misunderstanding being removed, the lovers united.

== Cast ==
The main cast of the film included:

- Madhubala as Madhubala
- Dev Anand as Ashok
- Jeevan as Kalicharan
- Ram Avtar as Pandit
- Ramesh Thakur as Doctor
- Randhir as Randhir
- Jagdeep as Child

== Production ==
=== Casting ===
In 1946, when Madhubala was 13 years old and playing juvenile roles, her pregnant mother suddenly became very ill. To save her life, there was a need of a good hospital. Madhubala, the sole earning member in the whole family, used to be paid a little amount of ₹300 in those days, while the hospital's fees was no less than ₹2,000. In this time of need, Ranjit Studios' Chandulal Shah came at the front to help her financially. He gave her ₹2,000 without a single question and her mother's life was saved.

This incident and Shah's kindness left a deep mark on Madhubala. In 1950, by which Madhubala was popular star, the studio was passing through bad times and was in dire of a hit. At this point of time, Madhubala not only did agree to star in a film by the studio but even worked in the film for free. This film, consequently named after the actress, came to be known as Madhubala.

== Soundtrack ==
Music.. Lachhiram Tomar

Lyrics.. Rajendra Krishan

Song... Singer

1. "Jawani ke zamane mein... " Talat Mahmood, Shamshad Begum, Chorus.

2. "Ab na jagegi yeh kismat..." Asha Bhosle

3. "Jo ulfat karega..." Asha Bhosle

4. "Yeh duniya hai bewafai ki..." GM Durrani

5. "Nai jawani rut mastani..." GM Durrani 6. "Kisi ko yaad karta hai Mera Dil..." GM Durrani

7. "Yeh Naya Naya hai Pyar..." Asha Bhosle

8. "Mujhe maar gayi balam Teri..." Asha Bhosle

Date=9 August 2023

== Release ==
=== Critical reception ===
The film was derided by film critics for its direction. The Motion Picture Magazine reviewed, "Under Prahlad Dutt's slow stupid and inane direction, Madhubala loses all coherency and logic. It stumbles forward in a clumsy manner till you lose all patience with it and curse under your breath every minute of the two hours." Madhubala was unanimously praised for her work, but other stars including Dev Anand were ridiculed for their performances.

Baburao Patel wrote in Filmindia's October 1950 issue, "This picture proves that even a popular and talented star like Madhubala rushes to work in any picture without worrying about art, quality or even her own reputation as an artist of talent."

Film Age Annual, another Indian film periodical of the time, wrote: "In their efforts to find a sophisticated medium for Madhubala, after whom this picture is named, director Prahlad Dutt stumbled on a script by Ramashankar Chowdhury, the king-pin of hack writers. The yarn about a lonesome heiress falling for a village yokėl is as old as the Western Ghats. How Prahlad Dutt, who held out such promise in Nazaare, selected such a poor theme for an ambitious venture like this is beyond us."

On the contrary, Indian Daily Mail reviewed the film favorably, particularly for the cinematography and the music. The lead actress was extensively praised: "Madhubala's beauty cannot be described on paper. She will very soon find her place amoung the hearts of film fans all over the country."

=== Box office ===
Due to the popularity surrounding Madhubala in those years, Madhubala was one of the most famous pictures in its initial week of release; The Motion Picture Magazine reported that the film was ruining to packed houses. However, the audience's interest in the film almost disappeared due to the negative reviews. According to Madhubala's biographer Khatijia Akbar, Madhubala was a "box office disaster".
