= Jagdeep filmography =

This is the filmography of Indian actor Jagdeep.

| Year | Film | Role |
|---|---|---|
| 2026 | Hum Mein Shahenshah Koun | |
| 2020 | Om Prakash Zindabad | |
| 2017 | Masti Nahi Sasti | |
| 2012 | Gali Gali Chor Hai | |
| 2009 | A Wonderful Story About Strange Love | Rustom |
| 2009 | Life Partner | Rohan's client |
| 2009 | Ek Se Bure Do | |
| 2007 | Journey Bombay to Goa: Laughter Unlimited | Latif Khekada – Husna's dad |
| 2004 | Kis Kis Ki Kismat | Dipankar Chattopadya |
| 2004 | Pati Ho To Aisa | |
| 2003 | Parwana | Seth Malpani |
| 2003 | Lift Karadey Remix (Short) | |
| 2002 | Rishtey | Mama |
| 2002 | Rang Mahal | |
| 2001 | Lajja | Bansidhar Chakkiwala |
| 2000 | Apradhi Kaun | Barsatilal |
| 2000 | To Fall in Love | Drunkard in Bar |
| 1999 | Truck Dhina Dhin (TV Series) | |
| 1998 | Wajood | Bagh Singh |
| 1998 | China Gate | Sub. Nageshwar Rammaiah |
| 1997 | Daayen | |
| 1996 | Hasina Aur Nagina | |
| 1996 | Talaashi | Inspector Jani |
| 1996 | Namak | Police Inspector |
| 1995 | Kartavya | P.K. Dhoot |
| 1995 | Ram Shastra | P.K. (Pyar Kiss) |
| 1995 | Kalyug Ke Avtaar | Sukhiram |
| 1995 | Veer | |
| 1995 | Policewala Gunda | |
| 1995 | Pyar Do Pyar Lo | |
| 1994 | Hum Hain Bemisaal | Havaldar Khadak Singh |
| 1994 | Andaz Apna Apna | Bankeylal Bhopali (as Jagdeep) |
| 1994 | Madam X | Zankar |
| 1994 | Sangam Ho Ke Rahega | |
| 1993 | Shuruaat | Malhar |
| 1993 | Dui Joddha | |
| 1993 | Bechain | |
| 1993 | Khun Ro Tiko | |
| 1992 | Insaan Bana Shaitan | |
| 1992 | Muskurahat | Badriprasad Chaurasia |
| 1992 | Pitambar | |
| 1992 | Binani | |
| 1991 | Phoolwati | |
| 1991 | Roohani Taaqat | |
| 1991 | Jhoothi Shaan | Shanti Dhooth |
| 1991 | Phool Aur Kaante | Professor Bihari |
| 1991 | Khooni Panja | |
| 1991 | Numbri Aadmi | Police Inspector |
| 1991 | Sanam Bewafa | Daroga |
| 1991 | Jigarwala | Shyamu |
| 1991 | Bhomli | |
| 1990 | Jamai Raja | Aruna's Father |
| 1990 | Kasam Dhande Ki | Chughomal |
| 1990 | Hum Se Na Takrana | Chhotey Babu |
| 1990 | Pati Patni Aur Tawaif | Ustad |
| 1990 | Solah Satra | |
| 1990 | Kroadh | Mastram – Matki's maternal uncle |
| 1990 | Shandaar | Chaurasia's PA |
| 1990 | Amavas Ki Raat | |
| 1990 | Bheem Bhavani (TV Series) (1990) | |
| 1990 | Is Paar Ya Us Paar | |
| 1990 | Wafaa | Music Director Doodhnath |
| 1989 | Akanksha (TV Movie) | Cripple patient complaining for foods |
| 1989 | Hum Intezaar Karenge | Actor (uncredited) |
| 1989 | Main Tera Dushman | Kalva |
| 1989 | Mamata Ki Chhaon Mein | Janki Nandan |
| 1989 | Mujrim | Lakhpati |
| 1989 | Gola Barood | B.E.S.T. Bus Conductor |
| 1989 | Nigahen: Nagina Part II | Munshiji |
| 1989 | Storm | Film director (uncredited) |
| 1989 | Abhimanyu | Pyarelal / Jack |
| 1989 | Touhean | Naseeb Dar |
| 1989 | Ashes to Ashes | Ustad |
| 1989 | Ilaaka | Havaldar Thanedar Tehsildar Singh |
| 1989 | Do Yaar | |
| 1989 | Khooni Murdaa | Khairati Lal Patthar Dil aka 'K.L.P.D.' |
| 1989 | Bees Saal Baad | Chedhu |
| 1989 | Kasam Suhag Ki | Kalha – Bandit |
| 1989 | Sachché Ká Bol-Bálá | Gulbadan Miyan |
| 1989 | Satyavadi Raja Harishchandra | |
| 1988 | Bai Chale Sasariye | |
| 1988 | Do Waqt Ki Roti | Baal Mukut Balwant 'Balam' Singh |
| 1988 | Saazish | 009 |
| 1988 | Zalzala | Groom |
| 1988 | Paigham | |
| 1988 | Janam Janam | Birju |
| 1988 | Soorma Bhopali | Soorma Bhopali |
| 1988 | Kabrastan | Hitler D'Costa |
| 1988 | Sherni | Hajaam |
| 1988 | Woh Mili Thi | Vijay |
| 1988 | Be Lagaam | |
| 1988 | Emperor | Tarachand Badlani |
| 1987 | Deewana Tere Naam Ka | Dilip Deoraj Ghayal Shiparpuri |
| 1987 | Parivaar | Constable Hukumat Singh |
| 1987 | Pyaar Ki Jeet | Nathulal |
| 1987 | Superman | Towffle |
| 1987 | Kaun Jeeta Kaun Haara | |
| 1987 | Khooni Mahal | Gangua |
| 1986 | Aag Aur Shola | Laddan |
| 1986 | Baat Ban Jaye | Nagath Narayan / Pt. Chakravew Vabisya Narayan Agnihotri |
| 1986 | Insaaf Ki Awaaz | Havaldaar Kanhaiya |
| 1986 | Nagina | Munshiji |
| 1986 | Aisa Pyaar Kahan | Bhootnath (Kasturi's father-in-law) |
| 1986 | Jumbish: A Movement – The Movie | Minister |
| 1986 | Pyaar Ke Do Pal | Scout Master |
| 1986 | Janbaaz | Sheru |
| 1986 | Karamdaata | Majnu |
| 1986 | Locket | Friendly appearance |
| 1986 | Sultanat | Arms supplier |
| 1986 | Raat Ke Baad | |
| 1986 | Jaal | Khatarnak Khan – Shankar's friend |
| 1986 | Kaanch Ki Deewar | Jaswant's tutor (as Jagdip) |
| 1986 | Pyar Ki Pahli Nazar | |
| 1985 | 3D Saamri | Changez Khan |
| 1985 | Aurat Pair Ki Juti Nahin Hai | Jamuna Das |
| 1985 | Ek Chitthi Pyar Bhari | Murugan |
| 1985 | Phaansi Ke Baad | Jaggi |
| 1985 | Pyaari Bhabhi | |
| 1985 | Zulm Ka Badla | |
| 1985 | Khoon aur Sazaa | |
| 1985 | Telephone | Dilawar Khan Dilliwale |
| 1985 | Ramkali | Rustom |
| 1985 | Hum Dono | Nursing Home Boy |
| 1985 | Ganga Ki Beti | |
| 1985 | Yeh Kaisa Farz | |
| 1984 | Grahasthi | 5 Star Hotel Manager |
| 1984 | Hanste Khelte | Pandu |
| 1984 | Rakta Bandhan | Bhola |
| 1984 | Shapath | Father of 7 children |
| 1984 | Yahan Wahan | Fatik chand bondopadhaya |
| 1984 | Love Marriage | Dudhwala |
| 1984 | Karishmaa | Thakkar |
| 1984 | Ram Ki Ganga | Professor Pyarelal |
| 1984 | Jeene Nahi Doonga | Jhumru – Jayshri's boyfriend |
| 1984 | Purana Mandir | Daku Machhar Singh |
| 1984 | Kunwari Bahu | |
| 1984 | Aaj Kaa M.L.A. Ram Avtar | |
| 1984 | Tohfa | |
| 1984 | Aakhir | |
| 1984 | Bad Aur Badnaam | Mishraji |
| 1984 | Divorce | Chakram |
| 1984 | Pakhandi | |
| 1983 | Faraib | Raghunath |
| 1983 | Haadsaa | Anthony Gonsalves |
| 1983 | Kaise Kaise Log | Tony |
| 1983 | Lalach | |
| 1983 | Lal Chunariyaa | Sunil |
| 1983 | Bade Dil Wala | Jaganath 'Jaggu' Prasad Srivastava |
| 1983 | Woh 7 Din | Ganga Prasad (Gangu) |
| 1983 | Love in Goa | Pankaj (Raju's Fan) |
| 1983 | Rachna | Ustad |
| 1983 | Mangal Pandey | Parwaz Mirza (uncredited) |
| 1983 | Kehdo Pyar Hain | |
| 1983 | Mayuri | |
| 1983 | Raja Jogi | |
| 1983 | Salam E Mohabbat | |
| 1982 | Aparoopa | |
| 1982 | Bheegi Palkein | Husseinbhai Madadgari |
| 1982 | Jeeo Aur Jeene Do | |
| 1982 | Zakhmee Insaan | |
| 1982 | Anokha Bandhan | Kalyanjibhai Bhojwala |
| 1982 | Vidhaata | Peter John DeCosta |
| 1982 | Sun Sajna | Balraj Kitoria (Hotel Manager) |
| 1982 | Ghazab | Salim (in the play) |
| 1982 | Sanam Teri Kasam | Banke Bihari Patnewala |
| 1982 | Dial 100 | Bhaijan Bhopali |
| 1982 | Ustadi Ustad Se | Kaamdev |
| 1982 | Honey | |
| 1982 | Nek Parveen | |
| 1981 | Bhagya | |
| 1981 | Jeene Ki Arzoo | |
| 1981 | Kalkut | |
| 1981 | Ladaaku | |
| 1981 | Meena Kumari Ki Amar Kahani | |
| 1981 | Sansani: The Sensation | Nawab Dhanekhapuri |
| 1981 | Sharada | Jagdeep |
| 1981 | Kaalia | George (Guest Appearance) |
| 1981 | Khoon Ka Rishta | Gopal-Dhrupad Damal |
| 1981 | Gehra Zakhm | Jimmy |
| 1981 | Fiffty Fiffty | Photographer |
| 1981 | Shama | John |
| 1981 | Sahhas | Karvat |
| 1981 | Jail Yatra | Chinareddy Eveready (Guest Appearance) |
| 1981 | Yeh Rishta Na Tootay | Bhagwan Das (as Jag Deep) |
| 1981 | Wardaat | Kabadi |
| 1981 | Khoon Aur Paani | Havaldar Maan Singh Gangotra |
| 1981 | Mangalsutra | Jaggu |
| 1981 | Aakhri Mujra | |
| 1981 | Farz Aur Pyar | Ashok |
| 1981 | Parakh | |
| 1981 | Sangdil | |
| 1981 | Yeh Kaisa Nashaa Hai | |
| 1980 | Dhamaka | |
| 1980 | Ganga Aur Suraj | |
| 1980 | Taxi Chor | Jaggu |
| 1980 | Ek Baar Kaho | Hanuman Singh (hotel caretaker) |
| 1980 | Phir Wohi Raat | Krupachand Reswani |
| 1980 | Jal Mahal | Munshi Aashiq Hussain Dildar |
| 1980 | Cobra | Prem |
| 1980 | Qurbani | Mohammad Ali |
| 1980 | Choron Ki Baaraat | Shekhar's friend |
| 1980 | Morchha | Ram Mohan Bhajiyawala |
| 1980 | Two and Two Make Five | Ramdheen, the landlord (Guest Appearance) |
| 1980 | Kali Ghata | Birbal / Police Inspector Sharma |
| 1980 | Badla Aur Balidan | |
| 1980 | Banmanush | |
| 1980 | Room No. 203 | |
| 1979 | Chambal Ki Rani | |
| 1979 | Dada | Jagdeep / Fake Moti |
| 1979 | Do Hawaldar | Nekiram |
| 1979 | Jaan-E-Bahaar | Mithailal (Rai's Manager) |
| 1979 | Sukhi Pariwar | Atar Chand |
| 1979 | Sunayana | Jaggoo |
| 1979 | Lakshmi Pooja | King's Executioner |
| 1979 | Tarana | Baadal |
| 1979 | Yuvraaj | Rajkumar Chandradev |
| 1979 | Raadha Aur Seeta | Bhagwandas |
| 1979 | Surakksha | Kabari |
| 1979 | Jaani Dushman | Nathuram |
| 1979 | Naya Bakra | Producer |
| 1979 | Sarkari Mehman | Nawab Khan |
| 1979 | Shikshaa | Harishchandra |
| 1979 | Meena Kumari Ki Amar Kahani | |
| 1978 | Assignment Bombay | |
| 1978 | Chowki No.11 | |
| 1978 | Karmayogi | Malpani |
| 1978 | Swarg Narak | Vinod's friend |
| 1978 | Dil Aur Deewaar | Kanhaiya |
| 1978 | Do Musafir | Murali |
| 1978 | Damaad | Bankey |
| 1978 | Anjane Mein | Abdullah |
| 1978 | Bhola Bhala | Tamanchewala |
| 1978 | Ganges of Saugand | Mathuradas |
| 1978 | Khunnus | |
| 1978 | Sampoorna Sant Darshanam | |
| 1977 | Aakhri Sajda | |
| 1977 | Agar... If | School-teacher |
| 1977 | Agent Vinod | Chandu alias James Bond |
| 1977 | Alibaba Marjinaa | Mustafa (Cobbler) |
| 1977 | Angaare | |
| 1977 | Dil Aur Patthar | Jagga |
| 1977 | Dildaar | Saudagarmal |
| 1977 | Dulhan Wahi Jo Piya Man Bhaaye | Jagdish |
| 1977 | Ek Hi Raasta | |
| 1977 | Janam Janam Na Saath | |
| 1977 | Kachcha Chor | Popatlal |
| 1977 | Khel Kismat Ka | |
| 1977 | Ladki Jawan Ho Gayi | |
| 1977 | Mandir Masjid | |
| 1977 | Prayashchit | |
| 1977 | Tinku | Bajirao |
| 1977 | Vishwasghaat | Chana Puri |
| 1977 | Jai-Vijay | Mangal Singh |
| 1977 | Aaina | Music Instructor |
| 1977 | Jadu Tona | |
| 1977 | Minoo | Drama Director |
| 1976 | Do Ladkiyan | Ganeshi |
| 1976 | Farrari | Soorma Bhopali |
| 1976 | Jai Mahalaxmi Maa | |
| 1976 | Koi Jeeta Koi Haara | |
| 1976 | Sangram | Jani |
| 1976 | Shahi Lutera | |
| 1976 | Bullet | Zafarullah Khan |
| 1976 | Two Strangers | Masterjee (Guest Appearance) |
| 1976 | Sharafat Chhod Di Main Ne | Jahangir Daruwala |
| 1976 | Khaan Dost | Abdul |
| 1976 | Shankar Shambhu | Havaldar Naik |
| 1976 | Nagin | Hukha Bhopali (uncredited) |
| 1976 | Fauji | |
| 1976 | Noor E Ilaahi | |
| 1975 | Angaarey | Moulana |
| 1975 | Biwi Kiraya Ki | |
| 1975 | Dhoti Lota Aur Chowpatty | Film hero |
| 1975 | Jaggu | Birju |
| 1975 | Raaja | Producer Malpani |
| 1975 | Rani Aur Lalpari | King of the Lilliputs |
| 1975 | Toofan | |
| 1975 | Sholay | Soorma Bhopali (Guest Appearance) |
| 1975 | Pratiggya | Kanha |
| 1975 | Maze Le Lo | |
| 1975 | Mere Sartaj | Munir-Ul-Haq Qadri |
| 1974 | Archana | Babloo |
| 1974 | Azad Mohabbat | |
| 1974 | Humshakal | Biharilal |
| 1974 | Insaaniyat | Abdulla |
| 1974 | My Friend | |
| 1974 | Pagli | Blacksmith |
| 1974 | Shaitaan | The Pimp |
| 1974 | Shandaar | Tolaram |
| 1974 | Roti | Khadak Singh |
| 1974 | Bidaai | Shankar Lal |
| 1974 | International Crook | D.D.T. |
| 1974 | Asliyat | |
| 1973 | Ghulam Begam Badshah | Harbhajan |
| 1973 | Kahani Hum Sab Ki | Hardayal 1 / Hardayal 2 / Dhanno |
| 1973 | Khoon Khoon | Pancham |
| 1973 | Mere Gharib Nawaz | Feroza's watchman |
| 1973 | Rani Aur Jaani | Mittu bhai |
| 1973 | Suraj Aur Chanda | Crazy man |
| 1973 | Taxi Driver | Drunkard at Club |
| 1973 | Aa Gale Lag Jaa | Jaggi |
| 1972 | Aan Baan | Bankhe |
| 1972 | Aankh Micholi | Dr. Mangal |
| 1972 | Anokhi Pehchan | |
| 1972 | Apna Desh | Shambhu / Ali Baba |
| 1972 | Babul Ki Galiyan | Sudheer's Friend No. 1 |
| 1972 | Bandagi | |
| 1972 | Dharkan | |
| 1972 | Dil Daulat Duniya | Kanhaiya 'Kunnu' |
| 1972 | Dil Ka Raaja | Bajrang 'Chakravarti' V. Singh |
| 1972 | Gora Aur Kala | Munna Singh / Chunni Singh |
| 1972 | Jaanwar Aur Insaan | Bahadur |
| 1972 | Rani Mera Naam | |
| 1972 | Sa-Re-Ga-Ma-Pa | Sur Mohan |
| 1972 | Wafaa | Devdas Thakur |
| 1972 | Bhai Ho To Aisa | Jaggi |
| 1972 | Chori Chori | |
| 1971 | Ek Nari Ek Brahmachari | Jugal Kishore |
| 1971 | Ganga Tera Pani Amrit | Barber |
| 1971 | Kabhi Dhoop Kabhi Chhaon | Ramesh / Tara |
| 1971 | Lagan | Pereira |
| 1971 | Parde Ke Peechey | Gautam |
| 1971 | Rakhwala | Gopi |
| 1970 | Aansoo Aur Muskan | Dada |
| 1970 | Darpan | Rickshawala |
| 1970 | Ghar Ghar Ki Kahani | Surendra |
| 1970 | Himmat | Tiger |
| 1970 | Ishq Par Zor Nahin | Lalit |
| 1970 | Saas Bhi Kabhi Bahu Thi | Kanhaiya |
| 1970 | Sharafat | Bhola |
| 1970 | Mere Humsafar | |
| 1970 | Khilona | Mahesh |
| 1970 | Kaun Ho Tum | |
| 1969 | Anmol Moti | |
| 1969 | Balak | Anantram 'Anant' D. Das |
| 1969 | Do Bhai | Gullu |
| 1969 | Hum Ek Hain | |
| 1969 | Jeene Ki Raah | Sunder |
| 1969 | Jigri Dost | Kasturi (Neelkanth's son) |
| 1969 | Jyoti | Pritam |
| 1969 | Ek Masoom | Jagdeep |
| 1969 | Sapna | |
| 1968 | Roop Rupaiya | |
| 1968 | Teen Bahuraniyan | Mahesh – Sheela's Assistant |
| 1968 | Brahmachari | Murli Manohar |
| 1968 | Lutera Aur Jadugar | |
| 1968 | Pyar Bana Afsana | |
| 1967 | Naunihal | Kavi |
| 1967 | Pyar Ki Baazi | Hero |
| 1966 | Aakhri Khat | Actor (uncredited) |
| 1966 | Aasra | Harish |
| 1966 | Do Dilon Ki Dastaan | |
| 1966 | Laadla | Murli |
| 1966 | Rustom Kaun | Qawwali Singer (uncredited) |
| 1966 | Afsana | Guloo |
| 1966 | Sarhadi Lutera | Akram |
| 1966 | Shankar Khan | |
| 1965 | Faisla | Jagga |
| 1965 | Noor Mahal | Vijay |
| 1964 | Baghi | |
| 1964 | Jekara Charanva Mein Lagle Paranva | |
| 1964 | Punar Milan | Sunil |
| 1964 | Qawwali Ki Raat | |
| 1964 | Samson | |
| 1963 | Band Master | |
| 1963 | Raja | |
| 1960 | Bindya | Ramu |
| 1959 | Baap Bete | |
| 1959 | Barkha | Ajit |
| 1958 | Malik | |
| 1958 | Solva Saal | Child Artiste (uncredited) |
| 1957 | Ab Dilli Dur Nahin | Masita |
| 1957 | Bhabhi | Baldev 'Billu' |
| 1957 | Hum Panchhi Ek Daal Ke | Mehmood |
| 1956 | Aawaz | Charlie |
| 1956 | Dhake Ki Malmal | |
| 1956 | Kismet Ka Khel | Ahmed |
| 1955 | Mr. & Mrs. '55 | Paper Boy (uncredited) |
| 1955 | Railway Platform | Purse-Snatcher |
| 1954 | Aar-Paar | Elaichi Sandow |
| 1954 | Bhai Sahab | |
| 1954 | Munna | Child Artiste |
| 1954 | Naukari | Boot Polish Boy |
| 1953 | Chalis Baba Ek Chor | |
| 1953 | Do Bigha Zamin | Laloo Ustad, shoeshine boy |
| 1953 | Foot Path | Pickpocket (as Jagdip) |
| 1953 | Laila Majnu | Child Artiste (uncredited) |
| 1953 | Papi | |
| 1953 | Shahenshah | Actor (uncredited) |
| 1952 | Aasmaan | Child artiste (uncredited) |
| 1952 | Dhobi Doctor | Young Kishore Kumar |
| 1951 | Afsana | Child in theatre play |
| 1951 | Sazaa | Actor (uncredited) |
| 1950 | Madhubala | Child Artiste (uncredited) |
