= Jagdeep Singh =

Jagdeep Singh may refer to:

- Jagdeep Singh (basketball) (born 1986), Indian basketball player
- Jagdeep Singh Sidhu, Indian film director
- Jagdeep Singh (politician) (born 1971), Indian politician
- Jagdeep Singh (kabaddi), Indian kabaddi player
- Jagdeep Singh (judge), Indian judge
