= Çevik Bir =

Turkish retired general (born 1939)

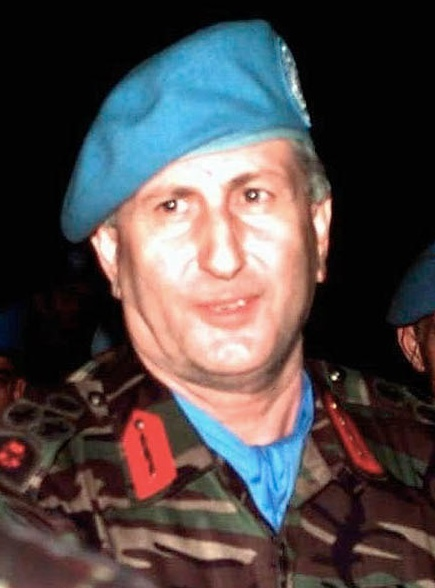
Çevik Bir in 1993

Çevik Bir (born 1939) is a Turkish retired army general. He was a member of the Turkish General Staff in the 1990s. He took a major part in several important international missions in the Middle East and North Africa. He was born in Buca, İzmir Province, in 1939 and is married with one child.

He graduated from the Turkish Military Academy as an engineer officer in 1958, from the Army Staff College in 1970 and from the Armed Forces College in 1971. He graduated from NATO Defense College, Rome, Italy in 1973.

From 1983 to 1985, he served at SHAPE, NATO's headquarters in Belgium. He was promoted to brigadier general and commanded an armed brigade and division in Turkey. From 1987 to 1991, he served as major general, and then was promoted to lieutenant general.

After the dictator Siad Barre’s ousting, conflicts between the General Mohammed Farah Aidid party and other clans in Somalia had led to famine and lawlessness throughout the country. An estimated 300,000 people had died from starvation. A combined military force of United States and United Nations (under the name "UNOSOM") were deployed to Mogadishu, to monitor the ceasefire and deliver food and supplies to the starving people of Somali. Çevik Bir, who was then a lieutenant-general of Turkey, became the force commander of UNOSOM II in April 1993. Despite the retreat of US and UN forces after several deaths due to local hostilities mainly led by Aidid, the introduction of a powerful military force opened the transportation routes, enabling the provision of supplies and ended the famine quickly. He was succeeded as Force Commander by a Malaysian general in January 1994.

He became a four-star general and served three years as vice chairman of the Turkish Armed Forces, then appointed commander of the Turkish First Army, in Istanbul. While he was vice chairman of the TAF, he signed the Turkish-Israeli Military Coordination agreement in 1996.

Çevik Bir became the Turkish army's deputy chief of general staff shortly after the Somali operation and played a vital role in establishing a Turkish-Israeli entente. He retired from the army on 30 August 1999. He is a former member of the Association for the Study of the Middle East and Africa (ASMEA).

On 12 April 2012, Bir and 30 other officers were taken in custody for their role in the 1997 military memorandum that forced the then Turkish government, led by the Refah Partisi (Welfare Party), to step down. On 11 September 2021, the General Staff Personnel Presidency reported to the Ankara 5th High Criminal Court, where the case was heard, that the administrative action was taken to demolish the 13 retired generals convicted in the February 28 trial. Thus, Çevik Bir was demoted.

Çevik Bir, one of the generals who planned the process, said "In Turkey we have a marriage of Islam and democracy. (…) The child of this marriage is secularism. Now this child gets sick from time to time. The Turkish Armed Forces is the doctor which saves the child. Depending on how sick the kid is, we administer the necessary medicine to make sure the child recuperates".

== Distinctions ==
- United Nations Medal (1994)
- US Medal of Merit (1994)
- Turkish Armed Forces Medal of Distinguished Service (1995)
- German Medal of Honor (1996)
- Turkish Armed Forces Medal of Merit (1996)
- United Kingdom Distinguished Achievement Medal (1997)
- United Kingdom Distinguished Service Medal (1997)
- Jordanian Medal of Istihkak (1998)
- French Medal of Merit (1999)

Military offices
Preceded by Atilla Ateş	Commander of the First Army; August 18, 1998–August 20, 1999	Succeeded by Hilmi Özkök
