= Jagdeep Singh (judge) =

Special Judge for the Central Bureau of Investigation (CBI)

Hon'ble Justice Jagdeep Singh
- Official portrait

Special Judge for the Central Bureau of Investigation (CBI)
- In office 2016–2021

Personal details
- Born: 18 October 1974 (age 52) Jagdeep Singh Lohan Jind, Haryana,India
- Education: Panjab University
- Occupation: Judge
- Profession: Law

Justice Jagdeep Singh is an Indian judicial officer who served as a Special Judge for the Central Bureau of Investigation (CBI) in Panchkula, Haryana.

== Early life and education ==
Singh was born in the Jind district of Haryana, India. He pursued his higher education in law and graduated with an LL.B. degree from the Panjab University Law College, Chandigarh. was granted Z-plus security in August 2017.

== Notable Judgments ==
=== Conviction of Gurmeet Ram Rahim Singh (2017 Rape Case) ===
In August 2017, Singh convicted Gurmeet Ram Rahim Singh, the head of the Dera Sacha Sauda sect, for the sexual assault of two female disciples.
