= Erdoğan Hospital =

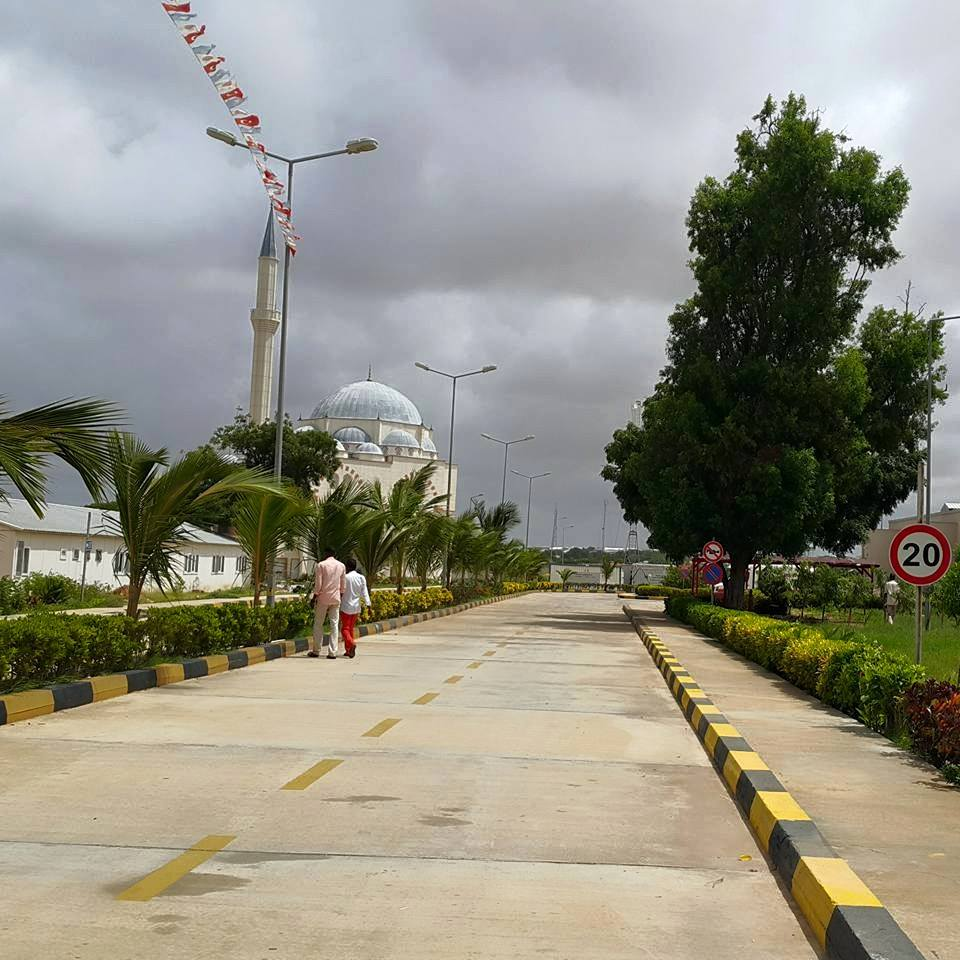

Geography
- Location: Mogadishu, Somalia

Organisation
- Care system: profit
- Type: Teaching, research and general medical services

Services
- Emergency department: Yes
- Beds: 200

History
- Founded: 1960s

Erdoğan Hospital, also known as the Digfer Hospital and the Somalia-Turkey Training and Research Hospital, is a hospital in Mogadishu, Somalia.

== Overview ==
The Digfer Hospital was constructed in the 1960s, with Italian engineers (Cooperativa Architetti e Ingegneri, Reggio Emilia) contracted to build its premises. The name came from the Italian construction company DegFer (Degola and Ferretti) the time has modified it in Digfer or Digfeer. It served as an important historic institution in Somalia's capital. Following the start of the civil war in the early 1990s, the hospital intermittently closed down. It also briefly operated under the aegis of the International Medical Corps.

In 2013, the Federal Government of Somalia reached an agreement with the Turkish authorities to refurbish and modernize the Digfer Hospital's infrastructure and services in keeping with international standards. In January 2015, the hospital was officially reopened at an inauguration ceremony in Mogadishu led by President of Somalia Hassan Sheikh Mohamud and President of Turkey Recep Tayyip Erdoğan. The Digfer Hospital was concurrently renamed Erdogan Hospital in honour of Erdoğan.

The renovated 200-bed Somalia-Turkey Training and Research Hospital was constructed by Turkey's international development body, the Turkish International Cooperation and Development Agency (TIKA). It has a $135.7 million operating budget, $85.6 million of which is slated to be covered by the Turkish authorities over the next five years.

== Facilities and services ==
The 13,500 square-meter indoor premises includes 20 neonatal incubators, 14 newborn intensive care beds, 12 intensive care beds, 4 operating rooms, and laboratory and radiology units.

Additionally, it has general surgery, neurosurgery, plastic surgery, child care, obstetrics, urology, internal medicine, anesthesia, dentistry and optometry departments.

== Staff ==
As of January 2015, the hospital will be staffed by about 91 Somali and 52 Turkish hospital administrators, head doctors, administrative directors or financial directors, as well as 40 Somali and 5 Turkish security personnel. Around 36 Somali assistants are also scheduled to participate in the facility's annual training program.
