= Soorma Bhopali =

1988 film directed by Jagdeep

- Theatrical release poster
- Directed by: Jagdeep
- Produced by: J. N. Entertainers
- Starring: Jagdeep
- Music by: Dilip Sen-Sameer Sen
- Release date: 1 July 1988
- Country: India
- Language: Hindi

Soorma Bhopali is a 1988 Indian Hindi-language drama film produced by Naved and directed by Jagdeep, who previously played Soorma Bhopali in the film Sholay.

== Plot ==
Soorma Bhopali is the owner of a Timber mart. He wants to distribute all his wealth to humanity. His trust and innocence are taken advantage of by the people. Dilwar Khan Dilwala, who happens to be the identical step brother of Soorma, keeps staking his claim on half of Soorma's inheritance. Soorma inherited a priceless necklace which, according to his mother, he will have to give to his bride. To get the necklace from Soorma, a group of smugglers sends a stage dancer, Sitara, to Bhopal to trap Soorma. Soorma takes the necklace and follows Sitara to Bombay, but two thieves by the name of Kaalia and Sambha relieve Soorma of his belongings, including the necklace.

== Cast ==
- Jagdeep as Soorma Bhopali / Dilawar Khan Dilwala
- Dharmendra as Mahendra Singh / Himself
- Amitabh Bachchan as Police Inspector
- Rekha as Drunk Woman
- Danny Denzongpa as Qawwali Singer
- Aruna Irani
- Ranjeet
- Kader Khan
- Dinesh Hingoo
- Mac Mohan
- Raj Kishore
- Johnny Lever
- Mehmood Junior
- Agha
- Tun Tun
- Birbal
- Viju Khote

== Soundtrack ==
Music: Dilip Sen - Sameer Sen, Lyrics: Asad Bhopali.

Song	Singer
"Main Hoon Soorma Bhopali"	Mohammed Aziz, Jagdeep
"Makhmal Ho Ya Taat Ka Parda"	Mohammed Rafi, Jagdeep
"Baadal Sataye"	Asha Bhosle
"Tum Aaye Zindagi Mein"	Dilraj Kaur, Alka Yagnik
"Mehroo Ki Rustam Se"	Dilraj Kaur, Jagdeep
"Tambakoo Nahin Hai"	Dilraj Kaur, Jagdeep
