= Jagdeep =

Indian actor (1939–2020)

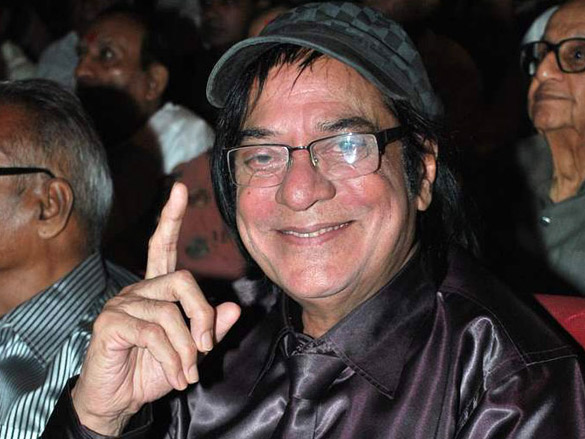
- Jagdeep at the Dada Saheb Phalke Academy Awards, 2010
- Born: Sayeed Ishtiaq Ahmed Jaffrey; 29 March 1939; Datia, Central India Agency, British India
- Died: 8 July 2020 (aged 81); Mumbai, Maharashtra, India
- Occupations: Actor; comedian
- Years active: 1951–2017
- Works: Full list
- Spouses: Naseem Begum; Sughra Begum; Nazima
- Children: 6, including Javed Jaffrey
- Relatives: Meezaan Jafri (grandson)

Sayeed Ishtiaq Ahmed Jaffrey (29 March 1939 – 8 July 2020), better known by his stage name Jagdeep, was an Indian actor and comedian who appeared in more than 400 films. He played Soorma Bhopali in Sholay (1975), Machchar in Purana Mandir (1983), Salman Khan's father in Andaz Apna Apna (1994) and directed the film Soorma Bhopali, with his character as the protagonist.

== Early life ==
Sayeed Ishtiaq Ahmed Jaffrey, later known as Jagdeep, was born into a relatively affluent family, as his father served as a lawyer for the local maharaja of Datia. He was the youngest among ten siblings, with the eldest brother being decades older. Around the age of seven or eight, Jagdeep's father died. His mother moved with him to Karachi to stay with her elder sons before the Partition, but they returned to India amid the communal violence and upheaval. Upon returning to Bombay (now Mumbai), Jagdeep and his mother experienced severe hardship. They were unable to reconnect with his elder brothers and ended up living on the streets, even under a bridge in Byculla. To survive, young Jagdeep sold clothes, toys, kites, soap, and combs. When money ran out, they subsisted on bread crumbs discarded by a bakery, scavenging for crumbs off the floor and cleaning them before eating—even removing rat and cockroach droppings.

== Career ==
Jagdeep started his film career as a child artist extra in B. R. Chopra's Afsana in 1951, then went on to do films as a child artist in films like Ab Dilli Door Nahin, K. A. Abbas's Munna, Guru Dutt's Aar Paar, Bimal Roy's Do Bigha Zamin and AVM's Hum Panchhi Ek Daal Ke.

He was launched as a leading man by AVM in the films Bhabhi, Barkha and Bindiya, and went on to do a few more films as a leading man. He established himself as a comedian since the movie Brahmachari. Some hit songs are picturised on him like "Paas baitho tabiyat bahal jayegi" from Punarmilan, "In pyar ki rahon mein" from the same film, "Chal ud ja re Panchhi" and "Chali Chali re Patang", from the superhit movie Bhabhi, where he is paired opposite Nanda, and "Aa Gaye Yaaro Jeene Ke Din" from Phir Wohi Raat.

He is also known for his appearances in many horror movies, especially in projects of the Ramsay Brothers. He appeared in famous hits like Purana Mandir and 3D Saamri. He died at his home in Mumbai on 8 July 2020, following age-related health issues.

== Personal life ==
Jagdeep married three times and was the father of six children. He has three children, Hussein, Shakira, and Suraiya from his first wife, Naseem Begum. Jagdeep deserted his first wife and children, so his first son, Hussein was forced to wash cars for a living. He (Hussein) lost his legs in a train accident in 2006 and was forced to beg and usually turned to Javed & Naved for help, but was treated as a beggar. He died on 22 October 2009, but neither his half-brothers nor his father came to see him.

In 1960, he married Sughra Begum. They had two sons, Javed Jaffrey and television producer/director Naved Jaffrey. Naved and Javed were hosts of the dance show Boogie Woogie.

Later, Jagdeep married Nazima and they have one daughter together, Muskaan Jaffrey.
