= Ramesh Thakur =

Indian United Nations official

Ramesh Thakur has served as Assistant Secretary-General of the United Nations and as Senior Vice Rector of the United Nations University. He is the Director of the Centre for Nuclear Non-Proliferation and Disarmament at Australian National University and was the inaugural director at the Balsillie School of International Affairs. Thakur was a principal architect of the Responsibility to Protect doctrine. Thakur is the co-Convenor of the Asia-Pacific Leadership Network for Nuclear Non-Proliferation and Disarmament, and has been a consultant to the governments of Australia and New Zealand on international security, arms control and disarmament. He was also a former fellow at the Centre for International Governance Innovation.
